= Archibald Strachan =

Scottish soldier

Archibald Strachan (died 1652) was a Scottish soldier who fought in the Wars of the Three Kingdoms, reaching the rank of colonel.

Early in the English Civil War Strachan served in the English Army under Sir William Waller taking part in a number of actions, before being assigned to garrison duty. He later joined the Scottish Army as a major in Sir John Brown's regiment of horse and fought at the Battle of Annan Moor in October 1645. In 1648 he rejoined the English army and served with the rank of major under Cromwell at the Battle of Preston (1648). With the execution of Charles I, the political situation in Scotland was unstable. Strachan supported the anti-royalist faction and took command of the Scottish Parliamentary army which defeated Royalist general Montrose at the Battle of Carbisdale. However the Scottish Parliament and a section of the Kirk party forged an alliance with Charles, Prince of Wales, offering him the crown of Scotland.

The Scottish Parliament made Strachan a commander of Scottish forces in the west, but Strachan joined the faction of the Kirk party which signed the Western Remonstrance. This faction demanded that the Act of Classes (1649) was enforced (removing Engagers from the army and other influential positions) and remonstrating against Charles being crowned King of Scotland. Strachan eventually defected to Cromwell. For his perceived act of betrayal he was excommunicated by the Kirk in January 1651 and in April the same year declared a traitor suffering the forfeiture of his property. He died the next year due to his grief from his excommunication.

== Biography ==
Strachan was born at Musselburgh, Edinburghshire, the son of a craftsman. Edward Furgol his biographer in the Oxford Dictionary of National Biography suggests that his relatively humble background, compared to most officers in Scotland at the time, who came from the landed classes, may have contributed to his radicalism which had more in common with the English independents in the New Model Army.

By February 1643 Strachan was a captain of dragoons in the English Parliamentary army of Sir William Waller. He was appointed later the same month quartermaster-general to the army and in July of the same year, shortly after the battle of Lansdown he was promoted to major and by September was in command of a regiment of dragoons which became part of the new army of the South-Eastern Association (Kent, Surrey, Sussex and Hampshire). He fought bravely during Waller's unsuccessful assaults on Basing House during November 1643.

Strachan remained with Waller as part of the South-Eastern Association until April 1644, when he became a captain and later major of horse in the Plymouth garrison. In October that year he appeared before the Committee of Both Kingdoms before taking command of a regiment of horse (cavalry).

He was prevented from remaining under English arms by the terms of the Self-denying Ordinance and joined the Scottish Army and by May 1645 had become major of Sir John Brown of Fordell's horse. By May 1645 he had become major in Sir John Brown's new regiment of horse. He participated in the destruction of the royalist Northern horse by Brown's regiment at the Battle of Annan Moor (20 and 21 October 1645). He continued in Scottish service until early February 1647.

In 1648 he had rejoined the English Army and served under Cromwell at the Battle of Preston (1648), with the rank of major. According to Robert Baillie, his former life had been "very lewd", but he had reformed, "inclined much in opinion towards the sectaries", and remained with Cromwell till the death of Charles I. He was employed in the negotiations between the Duke of Argyll and Cromwell in September 1648. He brought the news of Charles's execution to Edinburgh, and, after much discussion on account of the scandals of his past conduct, the commission of the Kirk on 14 March 1649 allowed him to sign the National Covenant.

Strachan was given a troop of horse (cavalry), and helped to disperse the levies of Mackenzie of Pluscardine at Balveny on 8 May 1649. The levies numbered 1,200, but they were routed by 120 horsemen. Alexander Leslie, 1st Earl of Leven, wished to get rid of him as a "sectary", but the Kirk supported Strachan, and he for his part was eager to clear the army of malignants. As to any danger from Montrose, he says, "If James Grahame land neir this quarters [Inverness], he will suddenly be de . . ed. And ther shalbe no need of the levy of knavis to the work tho they should be willing".

When Montrose did land, in April 1650, Strachan made good his words. By Leslie's orders he advanced with two troops to Tain, and was there joined by three other troops, making 230 horse in all, and by thirty-six musketeers and four hundred men of the Ross and Munro clans. On 27 April he moved west, along the south side of the Kyle of Sutherland, near the head of which Montrose was encamped, in Carbisdale, with 1,200 foot (of which 450 men were Danes or Germans), but only forty horse. By the advice of Andrew Munro, Strachan, when he was near the enemy, hid the bulk of his force, and showed only a single troop. This confirmed the statement made by Robert Munro to Montrose, that there was only one troop of horse in Ross-shire, and Montrose drew up his men on open ground south of the Culrain burn, instead of seeking shelter on the wooded heights behind. About 5 P.M. Strachan burst upon him with two troops, the rest following close in support and reserve. Montrose's men were routed and two-thirds of them killed or taken, and he himself hardly escaped for the time. After giving thanks to God on the field, the victors returned with their prisoners to Tain, and Strachan went south to receive his reward for winning the Battle of Carbisdale. He and Robert Hackett (the second in command) each received £1000 sterling and a gold chain, with the thanks of the Scottish Parliament. He had been hit by a bullet in the fight, but it was stopped by his belt and buff coat.

Strachan was in such favour with the Kirk that they contributed one hundred thousand marks to raise a regiment for him, the best in the army which Leslie led against Cromwell. He was in the action at Musselburgh on 30 July, and in the Battle of Dunbar, the loss of which he attributed to Leslie. He tendered his resignation rather than serve under Leslie any longer, and, to get over the difficulty, he was sent with Gilbert Ker and Robert Hackett to command the horse newly raised for the Western Association in the western counties. He corresponded with Cromwell, to whom he was much less hostile than he was to Charles and those members of the Kirk who supported him (who became known as the Resolutioners). It was the fear that Strachan would seize him and hand him over to the English that led Charles II to make his temporary flight from Perth in October.

Strachan and his associates sent a set of queries to Cromwell, to which the latter replied. Strachan did not sign the Western Remonstrance drawn up at Dumfries on 17 October against fighting for Charles II unless he abandoned the malignants. Instead he took the more extreme position that if the Scots rejected Charles as King of the Scots, then English army would have no reasons to remain in Scotland and so that was the better strategy for the Scottish nation to follow. He was dismissed from his command but at first refused to leave. When he did he remained close to his regiment.

On 1 December troops from the Scottish Western Association army under Ker assaulted John Lambert's English forces in Hamilton but were beaten. The day after the battle those troopers who had not been killed or captured rallied to Strachan. He persuaded those who would not follow him (between 200–300) to disband, while he and another officer led thirty men to join Cromwell. He is said to have helped to bring about the surrender of Edinburgh Castle. He was excommunicated at Perth on 12 January 1651; in April he was declared a traitor and his goods were forfeited. Robert Wodrow says (on the authority of his wife's uncle, who had married Strachan's sister) that he took the excommunication so much to heart that "he sickened and died within a while". He adds that Cromwell offered Strachan the command of the forces to be left in Scotland, but he declined it.
