= William Govan =

- Born: 1623
- Died: 1 June 1661 (aged 38); Mercat Cross, Edinburgh, Kingdom of Scotland
- Military career
- Allegiance: Covenanters
- Rank: Captain
- Conflicts: Scottish Civil War: Battle of Carbisdale; Battle of Hieton

Captain William Govan (1623–1661). was a Scottish officer who fought for the Covenanters during the Wars of the Three Kingdoms. He was awarded the honour of presenting Montrose's standard to the Scottish Parliament in 1650. He was accused of deserting the Scottish army later the same year and supporting the English New Model Army under the command of Oliver Cromwell, which was at that time invading Scotland. On 1 June 1661, the year after the restoration of the monarchy, and a few days after he was found guilty of treason, he was hanged as a traitor next to the Mercat Cross in Edinburgh and his head was put on a spike and displayed at West Port, Edinburgh.

== Biography ==
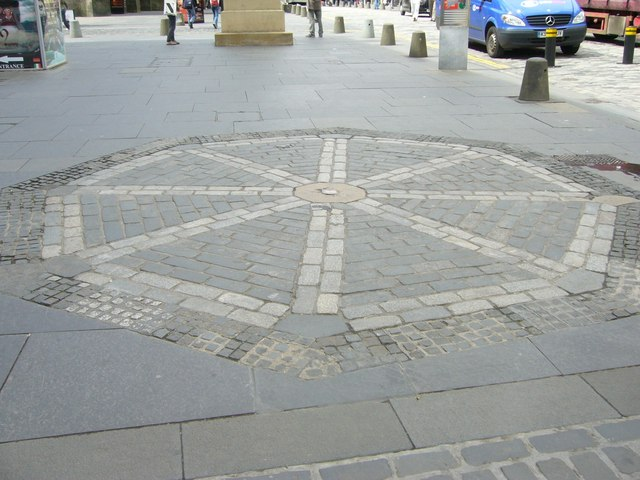
The place of Govan's execution at the Mercat Cross on Edinburgh's Royal Mile.

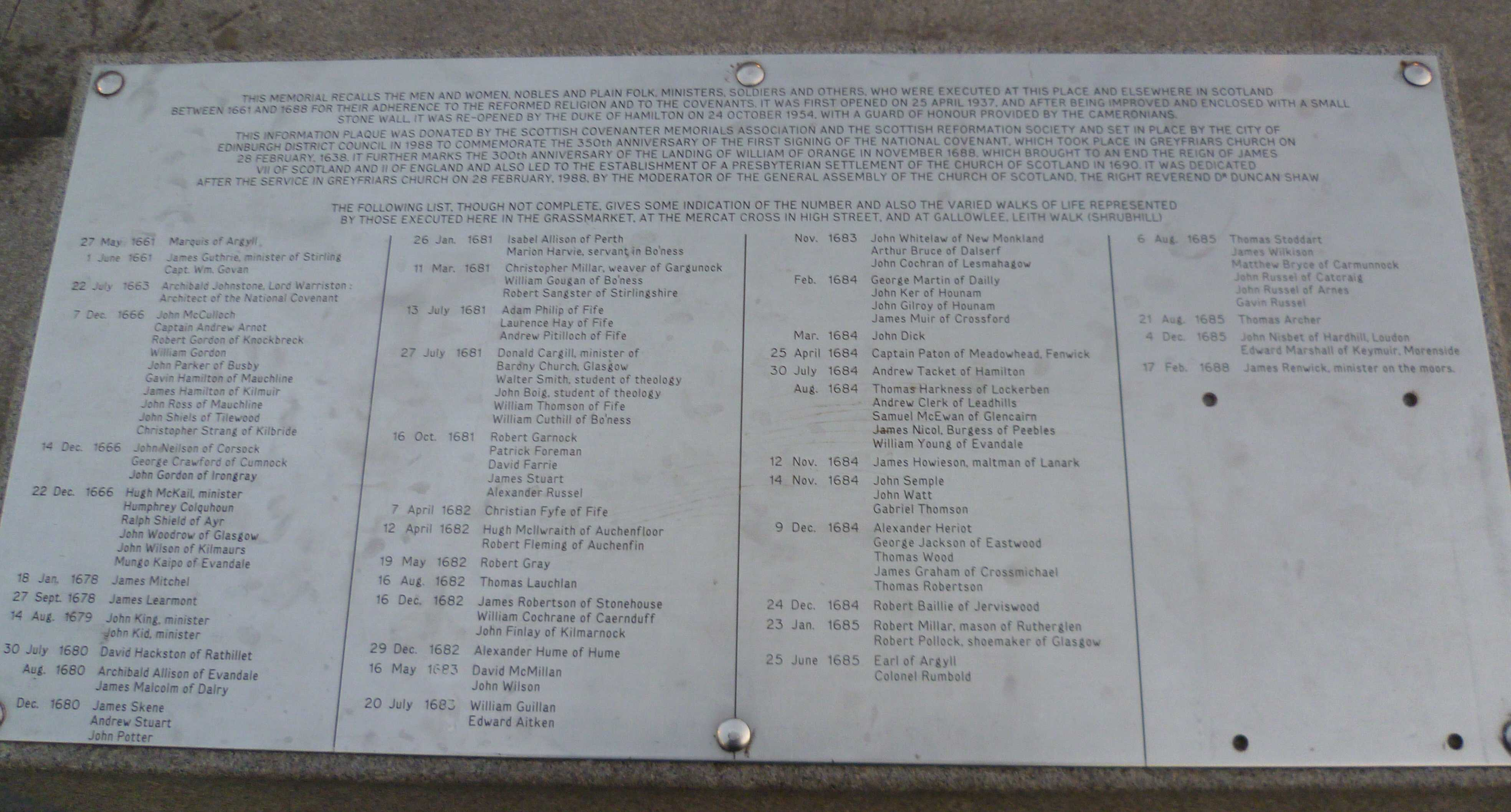
Plaque, Grassmarket

At the age of fourteen (around 1637), Govan had a religious awakening, and would remain a devout Presbyterian for the rest of his life. Like many Scotsmen he supported both the National Covenant and the Solemn League.

In 1650, Govan was a captain in the horse (cavalry) regiment of Colonel Archibald Strachan and took part in the Battle of Carbisdale which led to the defeat and the subsequent capture of the Royalist general Montrose. After the battle Groven was given the honour of taking Montrose's standard through the streets of Edinburgh and delivering it to the Scottish Parliament.

Strachan took a more extreme position than those who supported the Western Remonstrance drawn up at Dumfries on 17 October against fighting for Charles II unless he abandoned those excluded from public office and the army by the Act of Classes (1649). Strachan and two of his officers, Govan (now a major) and Scoutmaster Dundas, had sent a set of queries to Cromwell and other officers, to which the latter replied. So Strachan refused to sign the Remonstrance on the grounds that if the Scots were to reject Charles II as king of Scotland (rather than just banning his supporters from public office and the army), then the English New Model Army would have no reason to continue the campaign and would return to south of the border.

Strachan, was dismissed from his command, and Govan, and Dundas were cashiered. Strachan at first refused to relinquish his command and when he did, he remained close to his regiment while Gilbert Ker was placed in command of the army.

Ker readmitted Govan into the army, on the promise that he would fight for him. Ker decided to attack the English garrisoned at Hamilton not realising that Lambert had arrived with a large squadron of horse. The dawn attack which was meant to be a surprise was met by the English alert and ready for action. The Battle of Hamilton was a debacle, with Ker (who was wounded), Govan and others taken prisoner.

The remnants of the routed Scots melted away. But Strachan, Dundas and thirty others, left to join the English Parliamentary army. For his actions over the Hamilton affair, Strachan was found guilty of treason, his property was forfeited and he was excommunicated from the Kirk. He died the following year (1652).

At the Restoration of the monarchy, Govan was tried for treason on a warrant originally raised in 1651. He was found guilty of deserting the Scottish army and supporting the English army. Although not formally accused of them, two other rumours that circulated accused him of forewarning the English of the Scottish attack on Hamilton, and that he had been present on the scaffold when Charles I was executed. The former was never proven and the latter was dismissed because of his denial of such during the public speech he made before the gallows just before his hanging. Likewise during his gallows speech he denied that he had gone over to the English in 1650, but said that he had been a prisoner of war captured at Hamilton.

Govan was hanged for high treason beside the Mercat Cross in Edinburgh shortly after James Guthrie both of whom were executed soon after 2 o'clock on 1 June 1661. Once he was dead, his head was cut off and was placed on spike on the West Port of Edinburgh.

== Family ==
Govan was married. Just before he was executed he gave a friend a ring from his finger, requesting that it be given to his wife.
