= Interregnum (1649–1660) =

Political event

- 1649/1651–1660
Caroline era	Restoration
- Coat of arms of the Protectorate
- Including: Third English Civil War
- Leaders: Oliver Cromwell; Richard Cromwell

The Interregnum in the British Isles began with the execution of Charles I in January 1649 (and from September 1651 in Scotland) and ended in May 1660 when his son Charles II was restored to the thrones of the three realms, although he had been already acclaimed king in Scotland since 1649. During this time the monarchical system of government was replaced with the Commonwealth of England, enlarged in 1653 as the Commonwealth of England, Scotland and Ireland.

The precise start and end of the interregnum, as well as the social and political events that occurred during the interregnum, varied in the three kingdoms and the English dominions.

== Prelude ==
After the Second English Civil War, the leadership of the New Model Army felt deeply betrayed by the King because they thought that while they had been negotiating in good faith he had duplicitously gone behind their backs in making The Engagement with the Scots and encouraging a new civil war. In April 1648, the Grandees of the Army met for a three-day meeting in Windsor Castle. At the end of the meeting, the Grandees accepted that it was their duty "to call Charles Stuart, that man of blood, to an account for that blood he had shed, and mischief he had done".

The Army and the Independents conducted "Pride's Purge" of the House of Commons removing their ill-wishers, and created a court for the trial and sentence of King Charles I. At the end of the trial the 59 Commissioners (judges) found Charles I guilty of high treason, as a "tyrant, traitor, murderer and public enemy". He was beheaded on a scaffold in front of the Banqueting House of the Palace of Whitehall on 30 January 1649.

The execution of Charles I ushered in the period known as the Interregnum. The reactions to the regicide and to subsequent events varied considerably between the three Kingdoms and the English Dominions.

== Scotland ==
After the execution of Charles I on 30 January 1649, the Scots declared his son king as Charles II. The English responded with an invasion led by Oliver Cromwell, resulting in defeats for the Scots at Dunbar in 1650 and then at Worcester 1651, opening the way for the English conquest of the country. The interregnum has been referred to as "the Cromwellian ascendancy and military occupation of Scotland" in the Oxford Companion to Scottish History under the heading 'Restoration'.

Under the Tender of Union Scotland was declared part of a Commonwealth with England and Ireland in 1652, but despite repeated attempts, an act was not passed in Westminster to ratify the union until 1657. Under the terms of the union the Scots gained 30 members of parliament in the Protectorate (the Commonwealth of England, Scotland and Ireland), but many posts were not filled, or fell to English agents of the government, and had very little say at Westminster. Initially the government was run by eight commissioners and adopted a policy of undermining the political power of the nobility in favour of the "meaner sort". From 1655 it was replaced by a new Council of Scotland, headed by Irish peer Lord Broghill, and began to attempt to win over the traditional landholders.

The regime built a series of major citadels and minor forts at immense cost. The Scottish legal system was suspended, but some courts and institutions were gradually restored. Generally the regime was successful in enforcing law and order and suppressing banditry. There was a major Royalist rising in the Highlands in 1653–1655 led by William Cunningham, Earl of Glencairn and John Middleton. After initial success, it suffered from internal divisions and petered out after defeat at the Battle of Dalnaspidal in 1654.

The regime extended toleration to Protestants, including sectaries, but the only significant groups were a small number of Quakers. The Kirk was divided by the issue of co-operation with the crown into Resolutioners and more hard line Protesters. The regime tended to favour the Protestors giving them control over the universities. The country was relatively highly taxed, but gained access to English markets. The era was remembered as one of prosperity, but not everywhere benefitted from economic expansion. There was an attempt to create national symbols with the revival of the Union Flag and unite coin.

After the death of the Lord Protector Oliver Cromwell and the fall of his son Richard's regime, General George Monck, the military governor of Scotland, marched the English army in Scotland south and facilitated a Restoration of the monarchy in June 1660.

== See also ==
- List of ordinances and acts of the Parliament of England, 1642–1660
- Commonwealth of England
- The Protectorate
