= Western Association (Scotland) =

The Western Association was a Scottish military association to coordinate the military forces of the south western counties of Scotland during the War of the Three Kingdoms.

== Prelude ==
Most of the Lords and ministers of the south west of Scotland had not supported The Engagement of 1647 between a faction of the Covenanters and King Charles I, but after the defeat of those Covenanters opposed to the Engagement (known as the Kirk party) at the battle of Mauchline Muir by those in favour (who became known as the Engagers), the Engagers sent an army into England to support the English Royalists in the Second English Civil War. The Engager's army was defeated at the Battle of Preston in August 1648.

The credibility of the Engagers was undermined by their armies defeat at the battle of Preston, and members of the Kirk party in the south west organised the Whiggamore Raid that resulted in the overthrow of the Engagers party after a short civil war.

After the execution of Charles I, the kaleidoscope of Scottish parties rearranged themselves, as some of those who had opposed Charles I came around to the view that they should accept his son, Charles II, as King of Scotland if he agreed to sign the Covenant. After Charles landed in Scotland it became clear that the English would invade Scotland to prevent Charles establishing himself in Scotland, because they feared that he would use Scotland as a base for further operations against the English Commonwealth.

== Foundation and operations ==
The Kirk party created the Western Association in 1648, modelling it on the English Parliament associations (such as the Eastern Association). It was moribund until 1650 when an invasion from England became likely.

On 5 September 1650, the committee of estates commissioned Archibald Strachan, Gilbert Ker and Robert Hackett to take their regiments of horse (cavalry) to the south-west, to take command of the Western Association and to raise new levies.

In the early years of the English Civil War Strachan had fought for the English Parliamentary army against the English Royalists. He had commanded the army which defeated Royalist Marquess of Montrose at the Battle of Carbisdale 27 April 1650 and while serving under Leslie after April and before taking up his new command had made it plain that he did not support the Scottish Royalist cause.

Strachan took a more extreme position than those who supported the Western Remonstrance drawn up at Dumfries on 17 October against fighting for Charles II unless he abandoned those excluded from public office and the army by the Act of Classes (1649). Strachan and two of his officers, Major William Govan and Scoutmaster Dundas, had sent a set of queries to Cromwell and other officers, to which the latter replied. So Strachan refused to sign the Remonstrance on the grounds that if the Scots were to reject Charles II as king of Scotland (rather than just banning his supporters from public office and the army), then the English New Model Army would have no reason to continue the campaign and would leave return to south of the border.

Strachan was dismissed from his command, and Govan and Dundas were cashiered. Strachan at first refused to relinquish his command and when he did, he remained close to his regiment while Gilbert Ker was placed in command of the army.

Oliver Cromwell was now in the fortunate position of having two Scottish armies opposing him with allegiances to two different political parties, the Resolutioners who supported King Charles II and the Protesters or Remonstraters who opposed the King. So Cromwell resolved to confine his attentions to the operations of the Western Association army to destroy it and then with his flanks secured march north with the whole of his force, and attacking the Resolutioners army.

As the castle of Edinburgh was still in the hands of the Covenanters, Cromwell could only spare a force of about seven thousand horse, which he accordingly sent west about the end of November, under the command of John Lambert, to watch Ker's motions.

Intelligence of this movement was received by the Scottish Parliament then sitting at Perth, on 13 November, in consequence of which Colonel Robert Montgomery was despatched with three regiments to support the Western Association army, the command of which he was requested by the parliament to take; and, to enforce this order, the committee on military affairs was directed to send a deputation to the Western Association to intimate to them the command of the parliament.

Before Montgomery arrived, Ker, decided to attack the John Lambert's English Parliamentary force at Hamilton. Lambert's force was considerably superior in strength to Ker's, and were upon the alert, and when the Scots charged their quarters on the 1 December, at four o'clock in the morning. After a short skirmish, Ker's forces were dispersed, and he was wounded and taken prisoner.

The next day (2 December) the remnants of the Western Association in the Kyle district met 200–300 survivors of the army in the Kyle district of Ayrshire chose to disband rather than follow Strachan, Dundas and thirty of their collogues, who left to join the English Parliamentary army.

With the defeat and Hamilton and the loss of their two most prominent commanders the Western Association ceased to exist as an effective fighting force. Thus removing the threat to Cromwell's flank that had been posed by a force that had consisted of between 5,000 and 6,000 horse. This secured Cromwell position in the south of Scotland. The English were now in possession of the whole of Scotland, south of the Clyde and the Forth, with the exception of Stirling, and a small tract around it; and as the castle of Edinburgh surrendered on 24 December, Stirling castle was the only fortress of any note, south of the Forth, which remained in the possession of the Resolutioners at the close of the year.
