= Hugh Binning =

Scottish philosopher and theologian

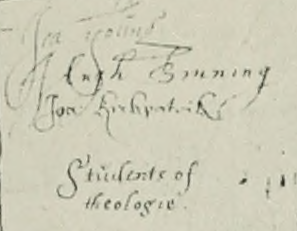
- Hugh Binning's signature from the Solemn League and Covenant (5 December 1643)
- Church: Govan
- Predecessor: William Wilkie
- Successor: David Veitch

Orders
- Ordination: 8 January 1650

Personal details
- Died: September 1653
- Denomination: Christian
- Spouse: Mary (Barbara) Simpson
- Education: University of Glasgow

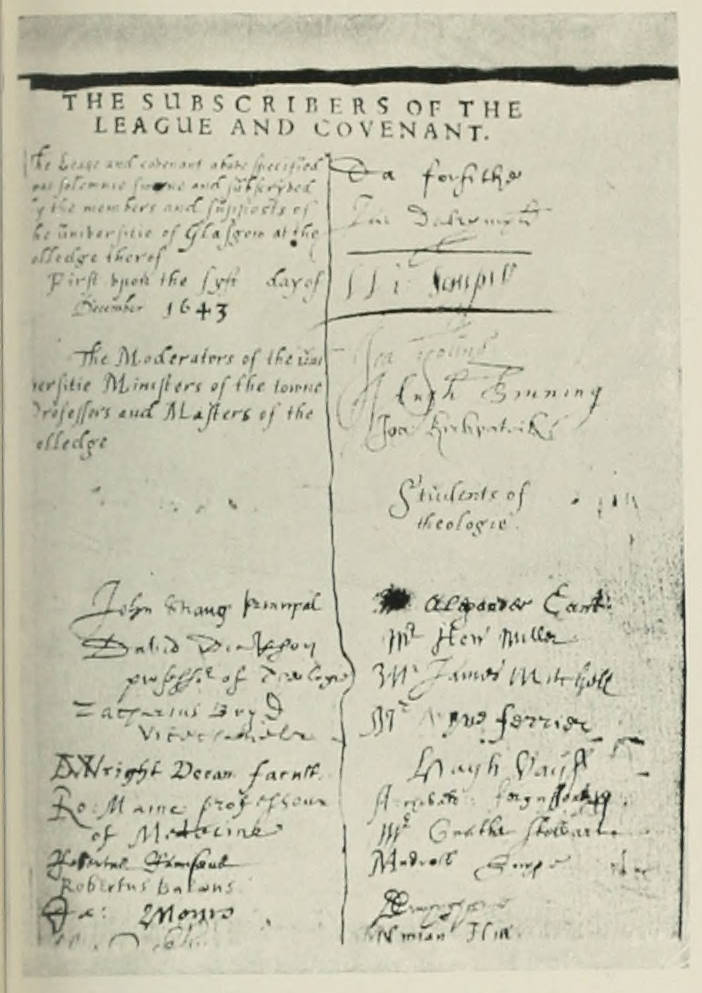
Signatures of subscribers on The Solemn League and Covenant of 5? December 1643

Hugh Binning (1627–1653) was a Scottish philosopher and theologian. He was born in Scotland during the reign of Charles I and was ordained in the (Presbyterian) Church of Scotland. A supporter of the Scottish Reformation, he refused to follow the episcopal church of the king of England, and preached as a Covenanter. He died in 1653, during the time of Oliver Cromwell and the Commonwealth of England.

Binning was born in Straiton, South Ayrshire. He studied Philosophy at the University of Glasgow at the age of 13 and became a professor there at the age of 18. He was ordained as a minister at the age of 22 and was summoned to debate in front of Cromwell in 1651.

He died of consumption and was buried in Govan.

His sermons were published after his death.

== Personal life ==
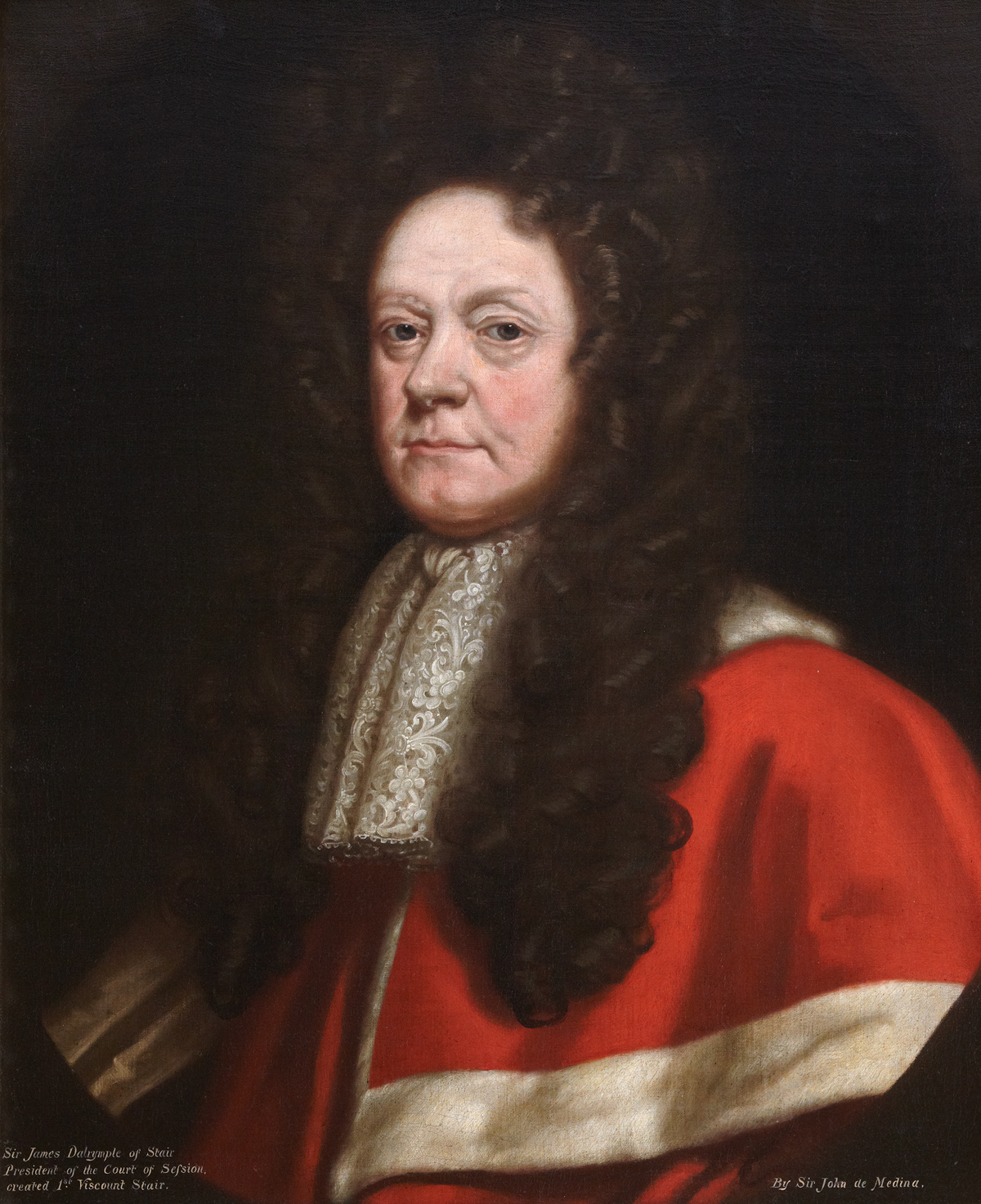
Sir James Dalrymple of Stair, President of the Court of Session, Created 1st Viscount Stair

Hugh Binning was the son of John Binning of Dalvennan, Straiton, South Ayrshire. and Margaret M'Kell. Margaret was the daughter of Matthew McKell, (Note: "Matthew M’Kell, was a minister in the parish of Bothwell, near Glasgow. "After having been, on different occasions brought before the Privy council, and imprisoned, he was, on the 8th of January, 1674, upon his refusing to engage not to preach, ordered to confine himself to the parish of Carluke, and security was required from him that he would appear before the Council at their summons ... He died at Edinburgh, in March 1681". (Works of Hugh Binning: Kindle Locations 20469-20474)) who was a minister in the parish of Bothwell, Scotland, and sister of Hugh M'Kell, a minister in Edinburgh. (Note: Some authors suggest that Matthew M'Kell was either the grandfather or uncle to Hugh M'Kail (sometimes Hugh M'Kell), which would make Hugh M'Kail a brother-in-law to Hugh Binning. The spelling of names was not as precise in those days, e.g. when describing Hugh Binning in the same document, there are variations of the spelling of the Binning name. Hugh M’Kell was arrested for being concerned in the insurrection at Pentland Rising. Hugh M'Keil was imprisoned and tortured (his foot was mangled to the point of compound fractures using the boot). In the end, M'Kell was executed in Edinburgh on 22 December 1666 because he would not sign the Test Act - because his preaching would not conform to the Anglican tradition. "The address of young M’Kail on the scaffold concluded with these sublime expressions - "“Farewell, father and mother, friends and relations. Farewell the world, and all delights. Farewell meat and drink. Farewell sun, moon and stars. Welcome God and Father! Welcome sweet Lord Jesus the Mediator of the new covenant! Welcome blessed Spirit of grace, and God of all consolation! Welcome glory! Welcome eternal life! Welcome death!" We are told by Kirkton that “when Mr. M’Kail died, there was such a lamentation as was never known in Scotland before, not one dry cheek upon all the street or in all the numberless windows in the market place". It was discovered afterwards, that Alexander Burnet, then the archbishop of Glasgow, had in his possession at the time, a letter from the king, forbidding any more blood to be shed. But to the disgrace of his sacred profession, and of his feelings as a man, "Burnet let the execution go on, before he produced his letter, pretending there was no council day between". (Binning, Hugh (24 March 2011) The Works of the Rev. Hugh Binning (Kindle Locations 20474-20487))) Binning was born on his father's estate in Dalvennan. The family owned other lands in the parishes of Straiton and Colmonell as well as Maybole in Carrick.

A precocious child, Binning was admitted to the study of philosophy at the University of Glasgow at age thirteen. Binning has been described as "an extraordinary instance of precocious learning and genius."

In 1645, James Dalrymple, 1st Viscount of Stair, who was Hugh's master (primary professor) in the study of philosophy, announced he was retiring from the University of Glasgow. Dalrymple was afterward President of the Court of Session, and Viscount Stair. After a national search for a replacement on the faculty, three men were selected to compete for the position. Binning was one of those selected, but was at a disadvantage because of his extreme youth and because he was not of noble birth. However, he had strong support from the existing faculty, who suggested that the candidates speak extemporaneously on any topic of the candidate's choice. After hearing Hugh speak, the other candidates withdrew, making Hugh a regent and professor of philosophy, while he was still 18 years old.

On 7 February 1648, (at the age of 21) Hugh was appointed an Advocate before the Court of Sessions (an attorney). In the same year, he married Barbara Simpson (sometimes called Mary), daughter of James Simpson a minister in Ireland. Their son, John, was born in 1650.

Binning became a minister on 25 October 1649. As minister of Govan, he was the successor of William Wilkie. His ordination took place on 8 January 1649, when Mr David Dickson, one of the theological professors at the College of Glasgow, and author of Therapeutica Sacra, presided. He was ordained in January, at the age of 22, holding his regency until 14 May that year. At that time Govan was a separate town rather than part of Glasgow.

Binning died around September 1653 and was buried in the churchyard of Govan, where Patrick Gillespie, then principal of the University of Glasgow, ordered a monument inscribed in Latin, roughly translated:

Here lies Mr. Hugh Binning, a man distinguished for his piety and eloquence, learned in philology, philosophy, and theology, a Prelate, faithful to the Gospel, and finally an excellent preacher. In the middle of a series of events, he was taken at the age of 26, in the year of our Lord 1653. Alive, he changed the society of his own land because he walked with God. And if you wish to make other inquires, the rest should keep silence, since neither you nor the marble can comprehend it.

== Family ==
Binning was married to Barbara Simpson (sometimes called Mary), daughter of James Simpson a minister in Ireland. Their son, John, was born in 1650.

After his death, his widow married James Gordon, an Anglican priest at Cumber in Ireland. Together they had a daughter, Jean who married Daniel MacKenzie, who was on the winning side of the Battle of Bothwell Bridge serving as an ensign under Lieutenant-Colonel William Ramsay (who became the third Earl of Dalhousie), in the Earl of Mar's Regiment of Foot.

Binning's son, John Binning, married Hanna Keir, who was born in Ireland. The Binnings were Covenanters, a resistance movement that objected to the return of Charles II (who was received into the Catholic Church on his deathbed). They were on the losing side in the 1679 Battle of Bothwell Bridge. Most of the rebels who were not executed were exiled to the Americas; about 30 Covenanters were exiled to the Carolinas on the Carolina Merchant in 1684. After the battle, John and Hanna were separated.

In the aftermath of the battle at Bothwell Bridge, Barbara Gordon tried to reclaim the family estate at Dalvennan by saying that John and his wife owed his stepfather a considerable some of money. The legal action was successful and Dalvennan became the possession of John's half-sister Jean Gordon, and her husband Daniel MacKenzie. In addition, Jean came into possession of Hanna Keir's property in Ireland.

By 1683, Jean was widowed. John Binning was branded a traitor, was sentenced to death and forfeited his property to the Crown. John's wife (Hanna Keir) was branded as a traitor and forfeited her property in Ireland. In 1685, Jean "donated" the Binning family's home at Dalvennan and other properties, along with the Keir properties, to Roderick MacKenzie, who was a Scottish advocate of James II (James VII of Scotland), and the baillie of Carrick. According to an act of the Scottish Parliament, Roderick MacKenzie was also very effective in "suppressing the rebellious, fanatical party in the western and other shires of this realm, and putting the laws to vigorous execution against them".

Since Bothwell Bridge, Hanna had been hiding from the authorities. In 1685, Hanna was in Edinburgh where she was found during a sweep for subversives and imprisoned in the Tolbooth of Edinburgh, a combination city hall and prison. Those arrested with Hanna were exiled to North America, however, she developed dysentery and remained behind. By 1687, near death, Hanna petitioned the Privy Council of Scotland for her release; she was exiled to her family in Ireland, where she died around 1692.

In 1690, the Scottish Parliament rescinded John's fines and forfeiture, but he was unable to recover his family's estates, the courts suggesting that he had relinquished his claim to Dalvennan in exchange for forgiveness of debt, rather than forfeiture.

There is little documentation about John after his wife's death. John received a small income from royalties on his father's works after parliament extended copyrights on Binning's writings to him. However, the income was not significant and John made several petitions to the Scottish parliament for money, the last occurring in 1717. It is thought that he died in Somerset county, in southwestern England.

== Impact of the Commonwealth ==
Hugh Binning was born two years after Charles I became monarch of England, Ireland, and Scotland. At the time, each was an independent country sharing the same monarch. The Acts of Union 1707 integrated Scotland and England to form the Kingdom of Great Britain, and the Acts of Union 1800 integrated Ireland to form the United Kingdom of Great Britain and Ireland.

The period was dominated by both political and religious strife between the three independent countries. Religious disputes centered on questions such as whether religion was to be dictated by the monarch or was to be the choice of the people, and whether individuals had a direct relationship with God or needed to use an intermediary. Civil disputes centered on debates about the extent of the King's power (a question of the Divine right of kings), and specifically whether the King had the right to raise taxes and armed forces without the consent of the governed. These wars ultimately changed the relationship between king and subjects.

In 1638, the General Assembly of the Church of Scotland voted to remove bishops and the Book of Common Prayer that had been introduced by Charles I to impose the Anglican model on the Presbyterian Church of Scotland. Public riots followed, culminating in the Wars of the Three Kingdoms, an interrelated series of conflicts that took place in the three countries. The first conflict, which was also the first of the Bishops' Wars, took place in 1639 and was a single border skirmish between England and Scotland, also known as the war the armys did not wanted to fight.

To maintain his English power base, Charles I made secret alliances with Catholic Ireland and Presbyterian Scotland to invade Anglican England, promising that each country could establish their own separate state religion. Once these secret entreaties became known to the English Long Parliament, the Congregationalist faction (of which Oliver Cromwell was a primary spokesman) took matters into its own hands and Parliament established an army separate from the King. Charles I was executed in January 1649, which led to the rule of Cromwell and the establishment of the Commonwealth. The conflicts concluded with The English Restoration of the monarchy and the return of Charles II in 1660.

The Act of Classes was passed by the Parliament of Scotland on 23 January 1649; the act banned Royalists (people supporting the monarchy) from holding political or military office. In exile, Charles II signed the Treaty of Breda (1650) with the Scottish Parliament; among other things, the treaty established Presbyterianism as the national religion. Charles was crowned King of Scots at Scone in January 1651. By September 1651, Scotland was annexed by England, its legislative institutions abolished, Presbyterianism dis-established, and Charles was forced into exile in France.

The Scottish Parliament rescinded the Act of Classes in 1651, which produced a split within Scottish society. The sides of the conflict were called the Resolutioners (who supported the rescission of the act – supported the monarchy and the Scottish House of Stewart) and the Protesters (who supported Cromwell and the Commonwealth); Binning sided with the Protestors. Binning joined the Protesters in 1651. When Cromwell had sent troops to Scotland, he was also attempting to dis-establish Presbyterianism and the Church of Scotland, Binning spoke against Cromwell's act.

On Saturday 19 April 1651, Cromwell entered Glasgow and the next day he heard a sermon by three ministers who condemned him for invading Scotland. That evening, Cromwell summoned those ministers and others, to a debate on the issue. a discussion on some of the controverted points of the times was held in his presence, between his chaplains, the learned Dr John Owen, Joseph Caryl, and others on the one side, and some Scots ministers on the other. Binning, who was one of the disputants, apparently nonplussed the Independents, which led Cromwell to ask who the learned and bold young man was. Told it was Binning, he said: "He hath bound well, indeed," ... " but, laying his hand on his sword, this will lose all again." The late Mr. Orme was of the opinion that there is nothing improbable in the account of the meeting, but that such a meeting took place is certain. This appears from two letters which were written by Principal Robert Baillie, who was then Professor of Theology at the University of Glasgow. At the debate, Binning is said to have out-debated Cromwell's ministers so completely that he silenced them.

== Politics ==
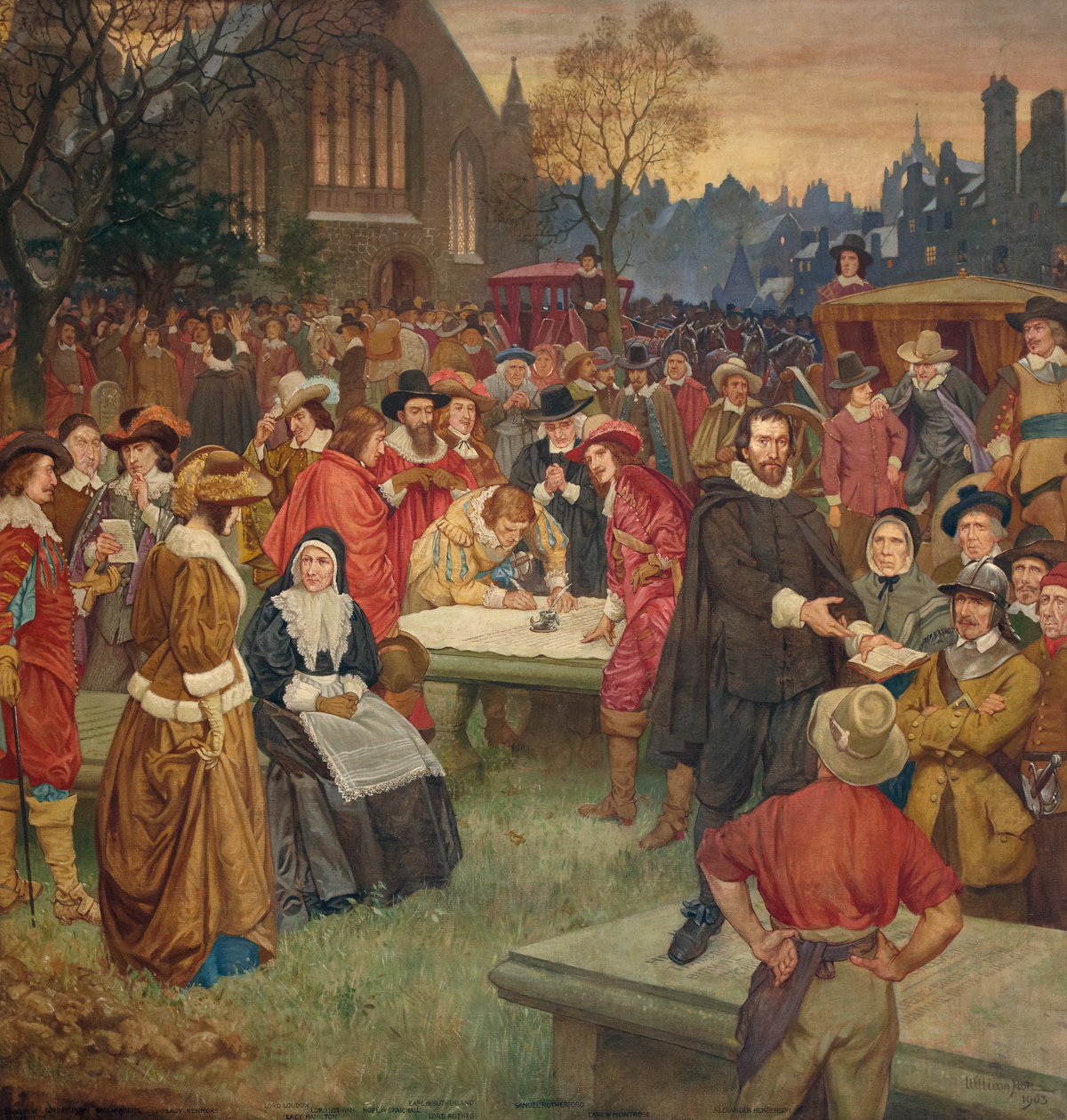
The Signing of the National Covenant. The Victorian painter William Hole places Alexander Henderson at the centre of events in 1638

Binning's political views were based on his theology. Binning was a Covenanter, a movement that began in Scotland at Greyfriars Kirkyard in 1638 with the National Covenant and continued with the 1643 Solemn League and Covenant - in effect a treaty between the English Long Parliament and Scotland for the preservation of the reformed religion in exchange for troops to confront the threat of Irish Catholic troops joining the Royalist army. Binning could also be described as a Protestor; both political positions were taken because of their religious implications. However, he saw the evils of the politics of his day was not a "fomenter of factions" writing "A Treatise of Christian Love" as a response.

== Theology ==
Because of the tumultuous time in which Binning lived, politics and religion were inexorably intertwined. He was a Calvinist and follower of John Knox. He was trained as a Philosopher, and he believed that philosophy was the servant of theology. He thought that both Philosophy and Theology should be taught in parallel. Binning's writing, which is primarily a collection of his sermons, "forms an important bridge between the 17th century, when philosophy in Scotland was heavily dominated by Calvinism, and the 18th century when figures such as Francis Hutcheson re-asserted a greater degree of independence between the two and allied philosophy with the developing human sciences."

Religiously, Binning was what we would call today, an Evangelical Calvinist. He spoke on the primacy of God's love as the ground of salvation: "... our salvation is not the business of Christ alone, but the whole Godhead is interested in it deeply, so deeply that you cannot say who loves it most, or who likes it most. The Father is the very fountain of it, his love is the spring of all."

With regards to the extent of the 'atonement', Binning did not hold that the offer of redemption applied only to the few that are elect but said that "the ultimate ground of faith is in the electing will of God." In Scotland, during the 1600s, the questions concerning atonement revolved around the terms in which the offer was expressed.

Binning believed that "forgiveness is based on Christ's death, understood as a satisfaction and as a sacrifice: 'If he had pardoned sin without any satisfaction what rich grace it had been! But truly, to provide the Lamb and sacrifice himself, to find out the ransom, and to exact it of his own Son, in our name, is a testimony of mercy and grace far beyond that. But then, his justice is very conspicuous in this work'."

He was a follower of James Dalrymple. In later life, he was well known as an evangelical Christian.

== Works ==
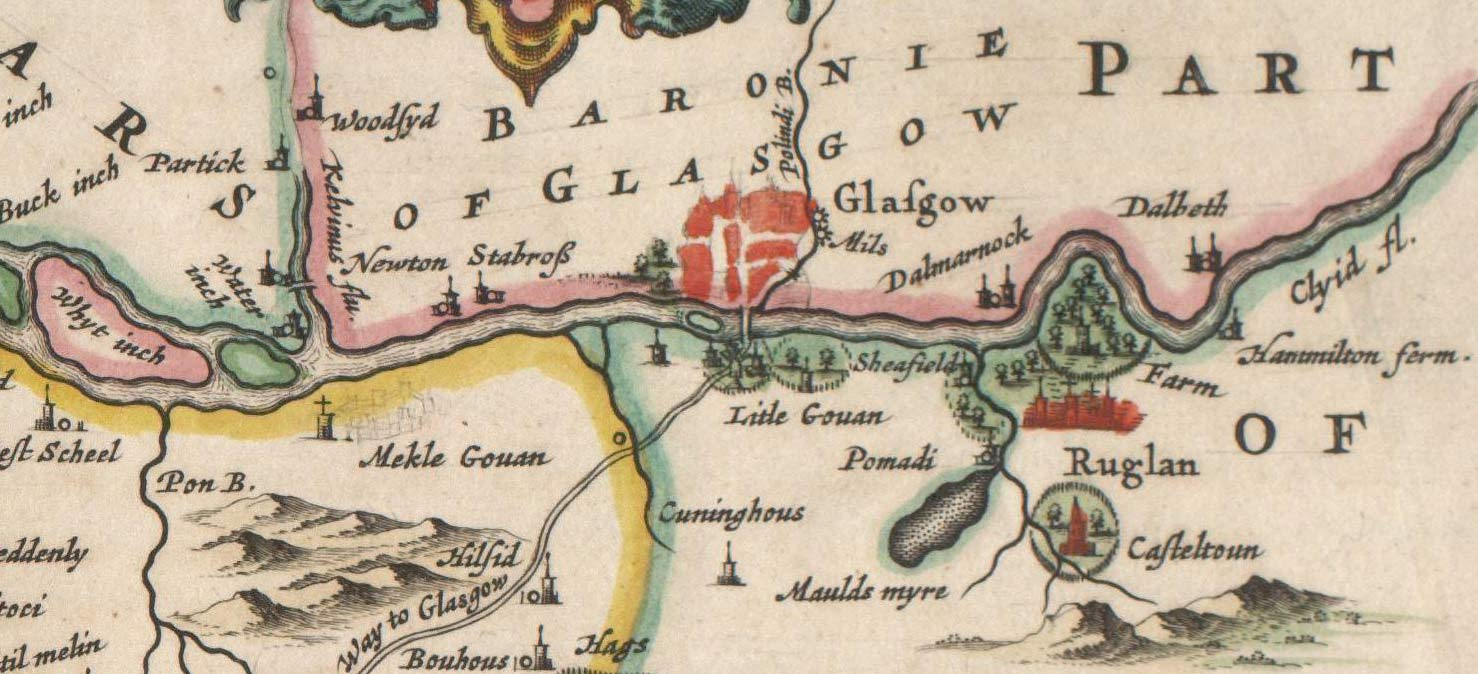
Govan in Binning's time. A part of Blaeu's 1654 map of Scotland. Modern Govan is at the site labeled Mekle Gouan ("Big Govan"). The small town of Glasgow is on the north bank of the Clyde, across from Litle Gouan ("Little Govan").

All of Binning's works were published posthumously and were primarily collections of his sermons. Of his speaking style, it was said: "There is originality without any affectation, a rich imagination, without anything fanciful or extravert, the utmost simplicity, without an thing mean or trifling."

- The Common Principles of the Christian Religion, Clearly Proved, and Singularly Improved; or, A Practical Catechism published by Patrick Gillespie in 1660 An analysis of the Westminster Confession of Faith. The work was translated into Dutch in 1678 by James Koelman, a minister of Sluys in Flanders.

(The Common Principles of the Christian Religion, fulltext) Quotations from the publication include:

On the love of God

And what is love but the very motion of the soul to God? And so till it have attained that, to be in him, it can find no place of rest.

On the free grace of the Gospel

I am guilty, and can say nothing against it, while I stand alone. But though I cannot satisfy, and have not; yet there is one, Jesus Christ, who gave his life a ransom for many, and whom God hath given as a propitiation for sins. He hath satisfied and paid the debt in my name; go and apprehend the cautioner, since he hath undertaken it, nay, he hath done it, and is absolved.

On Learning

Be not ignorant as beasts, that know no other things than to follow the drove; quæ pergunt, non quo eundum est, sed quo itur; they follow not whither they ought to go, but whither most go. You are men, and have reasonable souls within you; therefore I beseech you, be not composed and fashioned according to custom and example, that is, brutish, but according to some inward knowledge and reason. Retire once from the multitude, and ask in earnest at God, What is the way? Him that fears him he will teach the way that he should choose. The way to his blessed end is very strait, very difficult; you must have a guide in it,—you must have a lamp and a light in it,—else you cannot but go wrong.

- Sinner's Sanctuary, being forty Sermons upon the eighth Chapter of the Epistle of the Romans, from the First Verse down to the Eighteenth. a treatise originally published in 1670
- Fellowship with God, being Twenty Eight Sermons on the First Epistle of John, Chap. 1st and Chap. 2nd, Verses 1, 2, 3. a treatise originally published in 1671 by "A.S. who in the preferace to the reader, styles himself, his servant in the gosple of our dearest Lord and Savior"
- Heart Humiliation or Miscellany Sermons, preached upon some choice texts at several solemn occasions. originally published in 1676 by the same A.S. that published the treatice "Fellowship with God". The first of the sermons was preached July 1650
- An Useful Case of Conscience, Learnedly and Accurately Discussed and Resolved, Concerning Associations and Confederacies with Idolaters, Infidels, Heretics, Malignants or any other Known Enemies of Truth and Godliness. The treatise was used by the Covenanters and seems to have been originally published in Holland in 1693. There is a reference to the treatise at a "general meeting of Society people ... at Edinburgh 28 May 1683." The treatise expressed the opinion that Scotland should not support Charles I without some restraint placed on relatively absolute royal power and without assurance the Presbyterian religion could be maintained. The documents seem to have been presented to the Society either by Hugh Binning's son, John, or his widow, Barbara Gordon (who remarried about 1657 to James Gordon; he was born in Ireland and became a minister at Paisley, Renfrewshire, Scotland.) (An Useful Case of Conscience, fulltext). In the treatise Binning writes:

Where God hath given us liberty by the law of nature, or his word, no king can justly tie us, and when God binds and obliges us by any of these, no king or parliament can loose or untie us.

- A Treatise of Christian Love a sermon based on John 13:35, “By this shall all men know that ye are my disciples, if ye have love one to another” and 1 Corinthians 13. Binning explores the concept that as a believer in Christ, there is a need for Christians to show by their love for one another. (A Treatise of Christian Love, fulltext) Binning argues:

But Christ’s last words persuade this, that unity in affection is more essential and fundamental. This is the badge he left to his disciples. If we cast away this upon every different apprehension of mind, we disown our Master, and disclaim his token and badge.
On Charity

Charity "thinketh no evil." [1 Cor. 13:5] Charity is apt to take all things in the best sense. If a thing may be subject to diverse acceptations, it can put the best construction on it. It is so benign and good in its own nature that it is not inclinable to suspect others. It desires to condemn no man, but would gladly, as far as reason and conscience will permit, absolve every man. It is so far from desire of revenge, that it is not provoked or troubled with an injury. For that were nothing else but to wrong itself because others have wronged it already, and it is so far from wronging others, that it will not willingly so much as think evil of them. Yet if need requires, charity can execute justice, and inflict chastisement, not out of desire of another’s misery, but out of love and compassion to mankind. Charitas non punit quia peccatum est, sed ne peccaretur, it looks more to prevention of future sin, than to revenge of a bypast fault, and can do all without any discomposure of spirit, as a physician cuts a vein without anger. Quis enim cut medetur irascitur? "Who is angry at his own patient?"

- In 1735, the collections of Binning's works were published posthumously, originally edited by M. Leishman, a minister who was a later successor to Hugh in the parish of Govan, which contained sermons not previously published. There have been several editions of The Complete Works of the Rev. Hugh Binning, one of the latest (Classic Reprint) was published by Forgotten Books in 2012.
