= Robert Hackett =

Robert Hackett may refer to:

- Bobby Hackett (1915–1976), Irish-American jazz musician
- Bobby Hackett (swimmer) (born 1959), American former swimmer
- Robert A. Hackett, professor and researcher at the School of Communication, Simon Fraser University, Vancouver
- Robert Hackett (soldier), Scottish soldier
- Robert Hackett (sprinter), winner of the 1985 distance medley relay at the NCAA Division I Indoor Track and Field Championships
