= Restoration (Scotland) =

Return of the monarchy in 1660

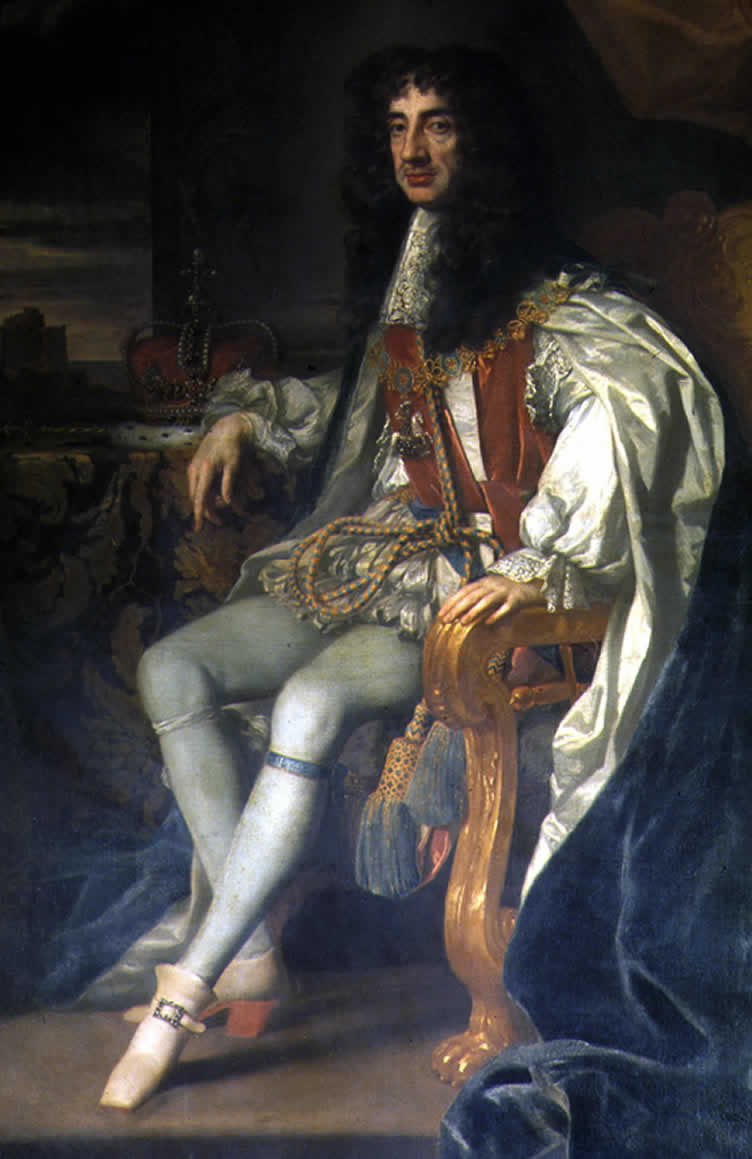
Charles II, restored to the throne of Scotland in 1660

The Restoration was the return of the monarchy to Scotland in 1660 after the period of the Commonwealth, and the subsequent three decades of Scottish history until the Revolution and Convention of Estates of 1689. It was part of a wider Restoration in the British Isles that included the return of the Stuart dynasty to the thrones of England and Ireland in the person of Charles II.

As military commander of the Commonwealth's largest armed force, George Monck, governor-general in Scotland, was instrumental in the restoration of Charles II, who was proclaimed king in Edinburgh on 14 May 1660. There was a general pardon for offences during the Wars of the Three Kingdoms, but four individuals were excepted and executed. Under the eventual political settlement Scotland regained its independent system of law, parliament and kirk, but also regained the Lords of the Articles and bishops, and it now had a king who did not visit the country and ruled largely without reference to Parliament through a series of commissioners. These began with the Earl of Middleton and ended with the King's brother and heir, James, Duke of York. The restoration of the Scottish Episcopacy led to a series of conflicts between Presbyterians and the Bishops of the Episcopalian establishment, culminating in the persecution of The Killing Time.

Charles died in 1685 and his brother the Duke of York succeeded him as James VII of Scotland and II of England. He survived attempted rebellions, but alienated much of the political nation by his Catholicism and policies. When William of Orange of the Netherlands, James' Protestant son-in-law, invaded England in 1688, James fled and William and his wife took over the throne as William II and Mary II. William called a Scottish Convention, which was dominated by the Presbyterians. It offered William and Mary the crown, and after the defeat of James' supporters the bishops were abolished and a Presbyterian system reinstated in the kirk.

The economic conditions of the period were generally favourable, although the restoration of Scottish independence reinstated the economic border with England and English tariffs. The restoration of the monarchy also saw the restoration of the nobility to political power, although they may have exercised their power with more caution. It also saw the rise of the lairds, who continued to gain new local political powers. There was an attempt to restore the theatre to Scotland, which had suffered from the lack of a court and the hostility of the kirk. The Restoration saw the introduction of a style of country house among the Scottish nobility that encouraged a move towards a more leisure-oriented architecture. As in England, sculpture was dominated by foreign professionals. Scotland produced notable artists and was also visited by many important continental artists. The period between 1679 and 1689 saw the foundation of many institutions that would be important in Scottish cultural and intellectual life.

== Background: civil wars and Commonwealth ==
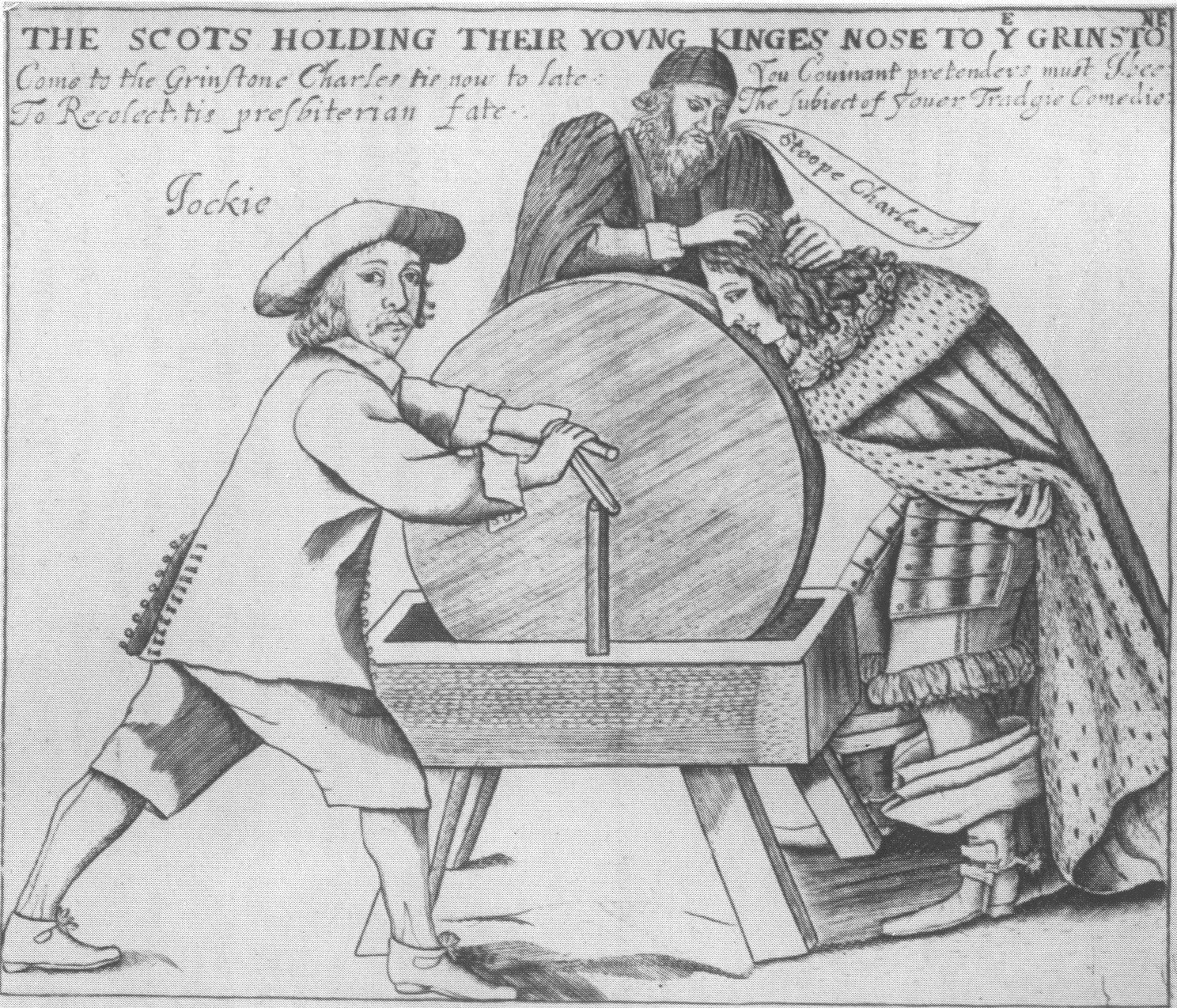
The Scots holding the young Charles II's nose to the grindstone of the Engagement, from a satirical English pamphlet.

In 1638, reforms imposed by Charles I on the Church of Scotland (the Kirk) led to the Bishop's Wars, the first in a series between 1638 and 1651 known as the Wars of the Three Kingdoms. The Covenanters took control of government and initially remained neutral when the First English Civil War began in 1642. However, many Scots were concerned by the consequences of Royalist victory for the Kirk and viewed union with England as the best way to ensure its survival. In October 1643, the English Parliament signed the Solemn League and Covenant, which agreed to union in return for Scottish military support.

Royalists and moderates in both countries rejected this on nationalist grounds, as did religious Independents like Oliver Cromwell, who opposed any state-ordered church. The Covenanters and their English allies considered the Independent-dominated New Model Army a bigger threat than the Royalists and when the First Civil War ended in 1647, negotiated to restore Charles to power. In return, he agreed to impose Presbyterianism in England and suppress the Independents but refused to become a Presbyterian himself. This split the Covenanters into Engagers, who were willing to accept this, and the Kirk Party or Whiggamores, who were not. After Cromwell's victory in the Second English Civil War, he installed the Kirk Party as the government of Scotland, who then expelled Engagers from the General Assembly.

This alliance ended with the execution of Charles in January 1649; as Calvinists, the Engagers and Kirk Party viewed monarchy as divinely ordered, making this an act of blasphemy. (Note: Today, Presbyterian or Episcopalian implies differences in governance and doctrine but this was not the case in the 17th century. Episcopalian meant rule by bishops, usually appointed by the monarch; Presbyterian rule by Elders, nominated by congregations. The Kirk was Calvinist in doctrine, the Church of England closer to Lutheranism; this is why a series of attempted unions in the 17th century, whether by James VI, Charles I, Covenanters or Episcopalians were unsuccessful) In February, the Scots proclaimed Charles II, King of Scotland and Great Britain and in the Treaty of Breda, agreed to restore him to the English throne. In return, he accepted the Covenant and was forced to disown a rising by the Royalist leader Montrose, who was captured and executed; Charles never forgot this humiliation.

After the Third English Civil War (Note: Also called the First Anglo-Scots War) ended with defeat in 1651, Cromwell decided the only way to guarantee peace was to destroy the power of the Kirk and the Scottish landed elite. Part of the solution was making Scotland part of the Commonwealth of England, Scotland and Ireland, with Scottish representatives sitting in the London Parliament. Final ratification of the terms was delayed by Cromwell's problems with his various parliaments and the union was not legally finalised until 1657. Scotland was ruled by a military administration under George Monck, which managed to enforce law and order and a degree of religious toleration. However, it did so using English judges, rather than Scots law, as well as being expensive, making it unpopular in both kingdoms.

Unlike England, 95% of Scots belonged to the Kirk and shared the same Calvinist doctrine; conflict was primarily over governance, with the victors expelling their opponents. The General Assembly was split between Resolutioners, who were willing to readmit former Engagers and Royalists, and Protesters, who refused. After defeating the Royalist Glencairn's rising in 1654, Monk's administration deliberately widened divisions within the Kirk; the effects dominated Scottish political life during the Restoration and beyond, as those previously expelled returned to power and excluded their opponents.

== End of the republic and return of Charles II ==
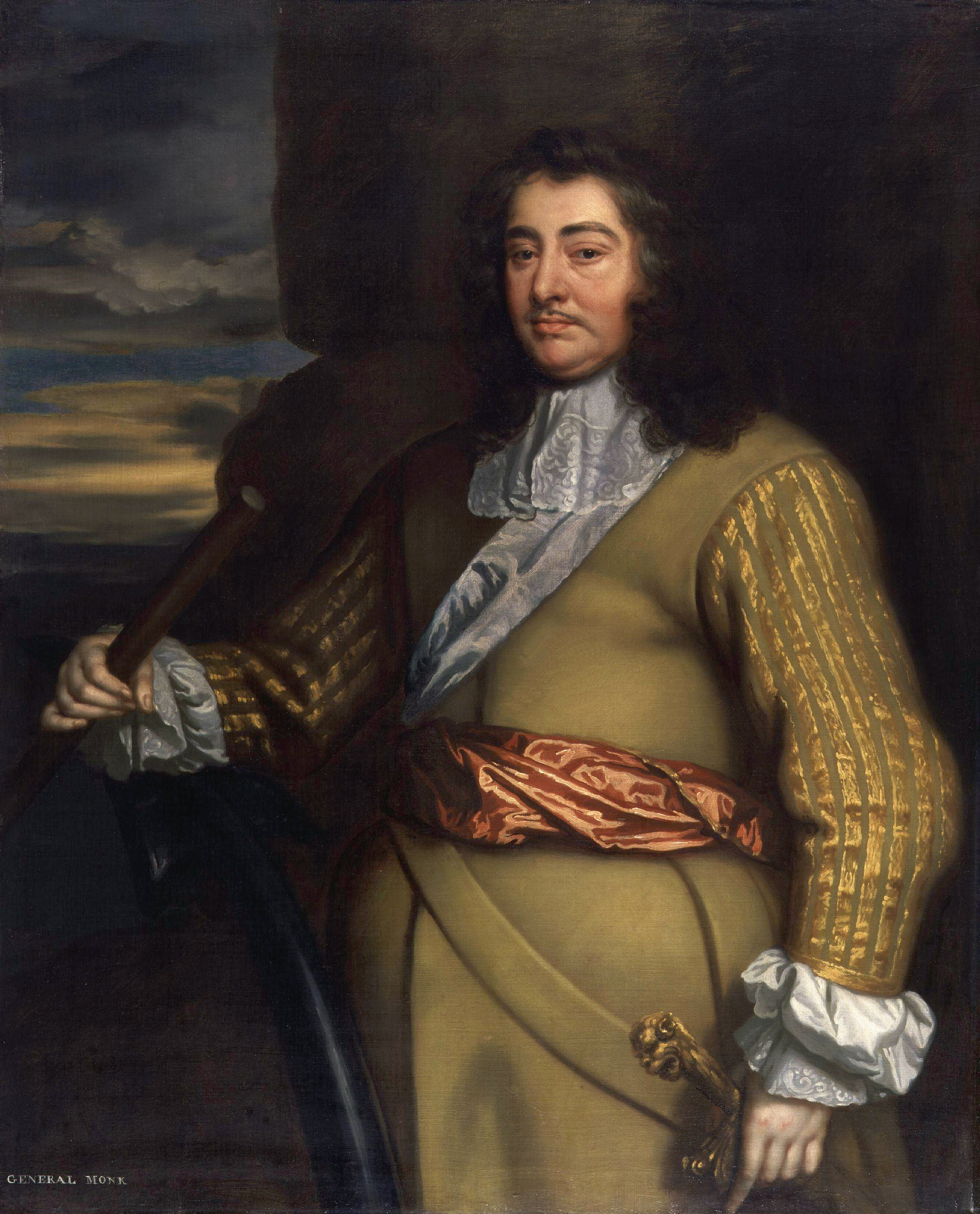
General George Monck, who was instrumental in the restoration of Charles II

As military commander of the Commonwealth's largest armed force, Monck was instrumental in the restoration of Charles II. After the death of Cromwell in 1658, Monck remained aloof from the political manoeuvring in London that led to the brief establishment of a regime under the protector's son Richard Cromwell and after its fall the subsequent contest for power between the army leaders. When this proved incapable of producing a stable government in 1659 Monck opened negotiations with Charles II and began a slow march south with his army. After reaching London he restored the English Long Parliament that had existed at the beginning of the civil wars. This body, having received assurances from Charles II, voted for a restoration of the monarchy in England and then dissolved itself. This created a de facto restoration of the monarchy in Scotland, but without any safeguards as to the constitutional position in the country. Scottish notables were in a weak position in negotiations with the crown as to what the settlement would be. Charles II gave Monck the title Duke of Albemarle in gratitude for his part in the Restoration.

Charles was proclaimed king in Edinburgh on 14 May 1660 (for the second time: the first having been more than ten years earlier on 6 February 1649). He was not crowned again in Scotland (having been previously crowned at Scone in 1651). The Restoration "presented an occasion of universal celebration and rejoicing throughout Scotland". Charles II summoned his parliament on 1 January 1661, which began to undo all that been forced on his father Charles I. The Rescissory Act 1661 made all legislation back to 1633 "void and null".

== General pardon and exceptions ==
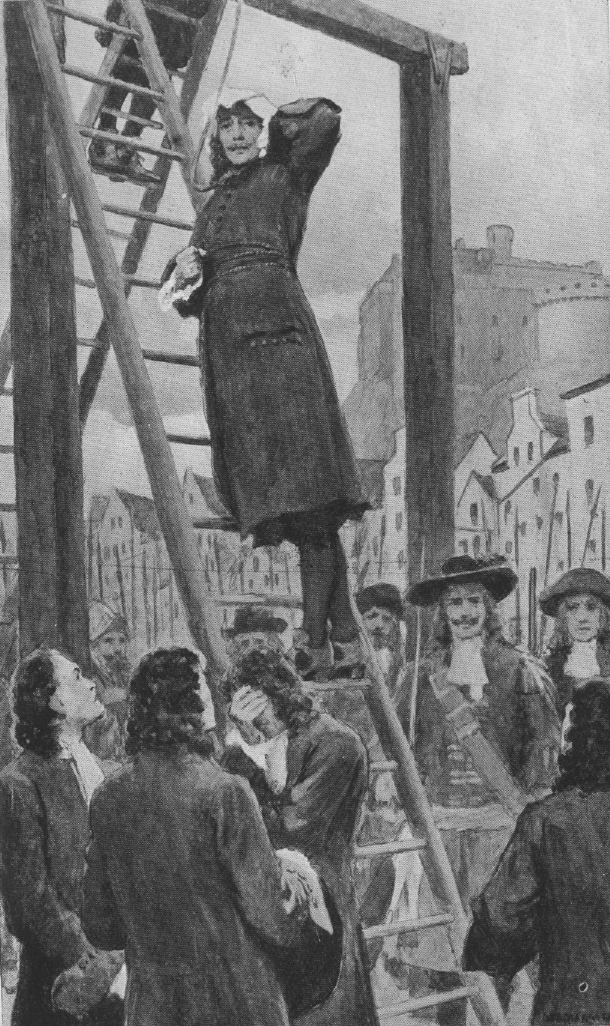
Execution of James Guthrie in Edinburgh, one of four exceptions to the general pardon

On 9 September 1662 the Scottish parliament passed the Pardon Act 1662 (c. 71), the Act of indemnity and oblivion. It was a general pardon for most types of crime that may have been committed by Scots, between 1 January 1637 and before 1 September 1660, during what the Act calls "the late troubles" (the Wars of the Three Kingdoms and the Interregnum). The act was structured in a similar way to the English Indemnity and Oblivion Act 1660, it legislated for a general pardon with exceptions, but (like Cromwell's Act of Grace) it contained many more exceptions than the English act. The act did not reverse the provisions of any previous act passed by the same Scottish Parliament or the provisions of the Committee of Estates passed since August 1660. It explicitly mentions the forfeitures of "Archibald Campbell, late marquis of Argyll, Archibald Johnston, sometime called Sir Archibald Johnston of Wariston, John Swinton, sometime called of Swinton, James Guthrie, William Govan, John Home and William Dundas, James Campbell, sometime called of Ardkinglas and James Campbell, sometime called of Orinsay". An additional act called the Act containing some exceptions from the act of indemnity was passed that included heavy fines for about 700 former adherents to the Covenant. The exceptions act specified that if an excluded person did not pay the fines by the date specified he (they were all men) would lose the benefit of the general pardon, but on timely payment he would "enjoy the benefit of his majesty's pardon and indemnity to all intents and purposes".

A few members of the previous regime were tried and found guilty of treason. Archibald Campbell (8th Earl of Argyll), beheaded 27 May 1661, James Guthrie and Captain William Govan hanged 1 June 1661, and Archibald Johnston (Lord Warriston) hanged 22 July 1663. John Swinton (1621?–1679) was condemned to forfeiture and imprisonment in Edinburgh Castle, where he remained for some years before being released. In 1661 John Home of Kelloe had his estates sequestrated for being with the English army against the King's army at the battle of Worcester in 1651. After the Glorious Revolution of 1688 the estates were restored to his son George.

== Settlement ==
Under the eventual political settlement Scotland regained its independent system of law, parliament and kirk, but also regained the Lords of the Articles and bishops, and it now had a king who did not visit the country and ruled largely without reference to Parliament through a series of commissioners. These began with Earl of Middleton and ended with the King's brother and heir, James, Duke of York (known in Scotland as the Duke of Albany).

=== Restoration Episcopate ===
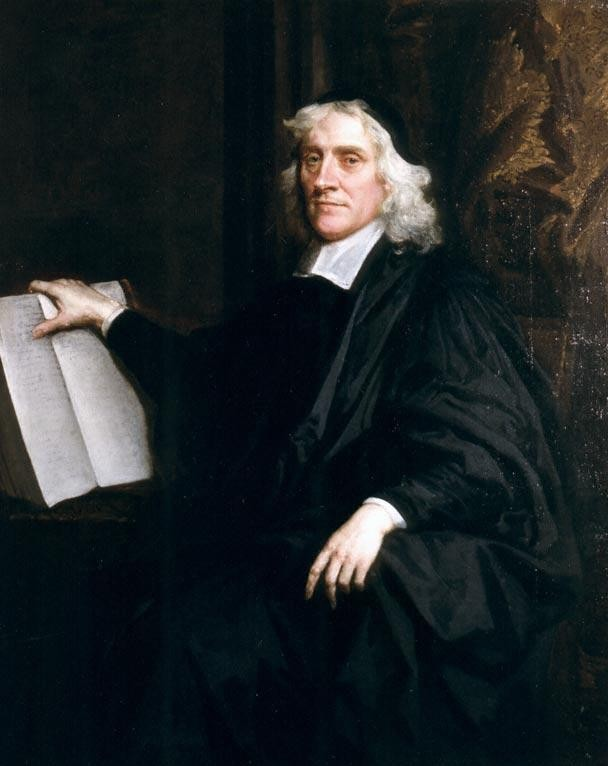
James Sharp, a Resolutioner and then archbishop, who was murdered in 1679

Presbyterians had hoped that Charles would implement a Presbyterian settlement for the kirk, as Charles had agreed to the Solemn League and Covenant under the Treaty of Breda (1650). The "Act Recissory" that revoked legislation back to 1633 removed the Covenanter gains of the Bishops' Wars, but an Act passed later the same day renewed the discipline of kirk sessions, presbyteries and synods, suggesting that a compromise between the crown and the Presbyterians was possible. The Restoration of episcopacy was proclaimed by the Privy Council of Scotland on 6 September 1661. James Sharp, minister of Crail, who was in London to represent the interests of the Resolutioners, changed sides and accepted the position of Archbishop of St Andrews. Soon an entire bench of bishops had been assembled. During the parliamentary session of 1662 the Church of Scotland was restored as the national church and all office-holders were required to renounce the Covenants. Church ministers were forced to accept the new circumstances or lose their livings. Up to a third, at least 270, of the ministry refused. Most of the vacancies occurred in the south-west of Scotland, an area particularly strong in its Covenanting sympathies. Some of the ministers also took to preaching in the open fields in conventicles, often attracting thousands of worshippers.

== Charles II's commissioners (1661–1685) ==
=== Middleton (1661–1663) ===
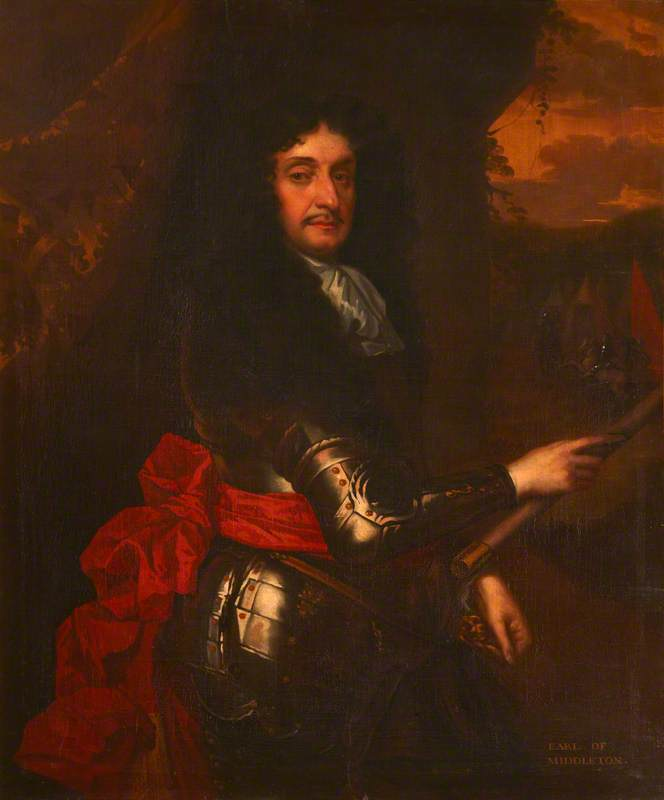
Earl of Middleton, Charles II's first Commissioner in Scotland

The King's first political action in Scotland was to appoint officers of state and members of the privy council without reference to parliament. The royalist William Cunningham, 9th Earl of Glencairn became Chancellor and John Leslie, Earl of Rothes became President of the council. A new Scottish Council was created in London, which was headed by James Maitland, Earl of Lauderdale. Former Covernanter and royalist soldier John Middleton, newly raised to be Earl of Middleton, was appointed as Commissioner. A new parliament met on 1 January 1661, later known by its presbyterian critics as the "drunken parliament", it passed 393 Acts, particularly supporting the episcopalian structure of the church favoured by Middleton and the authority of the king over government and parliament. In 1663 Middleton attempted to pass an act that would have compelled all office holders to declare that the two covenants were unlawful and seditious. This was a direct attack on former covenanters like the King's favourite Lauderdale and as a result Middleton was recalled and replaced with Rothes.

=== Rothes (1663–1666) ===
Rothes acted as a client of Lauderdale. In 1663 parliament passed an "Act Against Separation and Disobedience to Ecclesiastical Authority", popularly known as the "Bishop's Dragnet". It declared dissenting ministers as seditious persons and allowed the imposition of heavy fines on those who failed to attend the parish churches. Soon after parliament was dismissed and would not be recalled for six years. In 1666 a group of dissenters from Galloway captured the government's local military commander, Sir James Turner, and marched on Edinburgh. They probably numbered at the most 3,000 men and by the time they were defeated at the Battle of Rullion Green, they had dwindled to less than a third of that number. Of fifty prisoners, thirty-three were executed, two after torture, and the rest were transported to Barbados. There were then a series of arrests of suspected persons. The rising resulted in the fall of Rothes as Commissioner and Lauderdale now returned from London to take up the role.

=== Lauderdale (1666–1679) ===
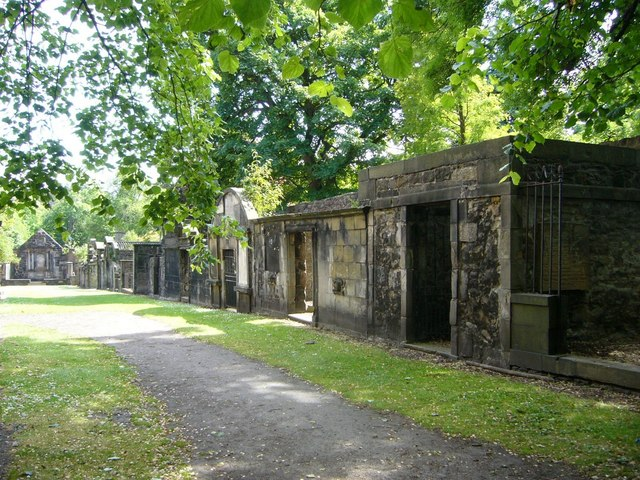
The Covenanter's Prison in St Giles Kirkyard, Edinburgh, where prisoners were held after the Battle of Bothwell Bridge in 1679

Lauderdale attempted a more conciliatory policy, issuing Letters of Indulgence in 1669, 1672 and 1679. These allowed evicted ministers to return to their parishes, if they would avoid political dissent. One-hundred and fifty refused to accept the offer and some episcopalians were alienated by the compromise. The failure to reach an accommodation led to a return to severity. Preaching at a conventicle was made punishable by death and attendance was punishable by severe sanctions. In 1674 heritors and masters were made responsible for their tenants and servants and from 1677 they had to enter bonds for the conduct of everyone living on their land. In 1678 3,000 Lowland militia and 6,000 Highlanders, known as the "Highland Host", were billeted in the Covenanting shires as a form of punishment.

In 1679 a group of Covenanters killed Archbishop James Sharp. The incident led to a rising that grew to 5,000 men. They were defeated by forces under James, Duke of Monmouth, the King's illegitimate son, at the Battle of Bothwell Bridge on 22 June. Two ministers were executed and 250 followers shipped to Barbados, 200 drowning when their ship went down off Orkney. The rebellion eventually led to the fall of Lauderdale, who was replaced by the King's brother, James, Duke of York, known in Scotland as the Duke of Albany.

=== Duke of Albany (1679–1685) ===
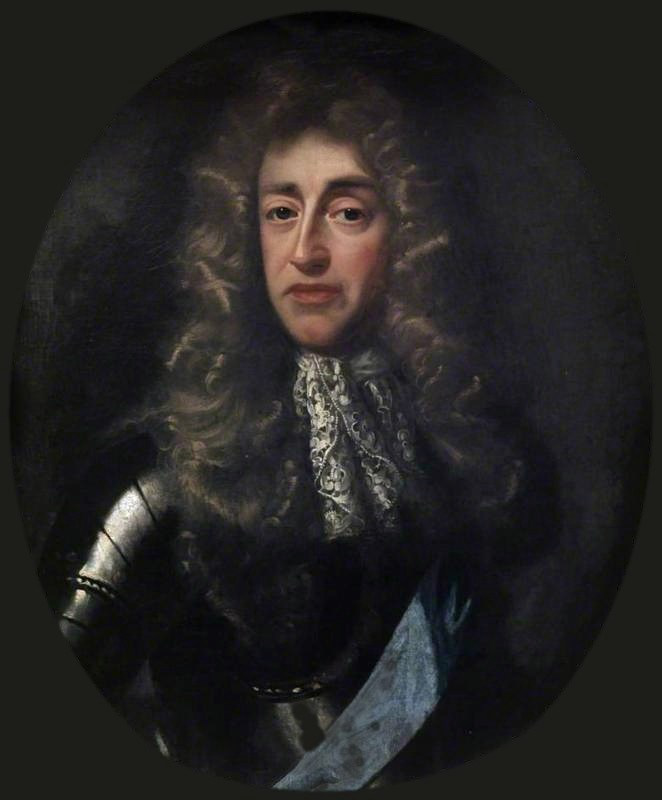
James, Duke of Albany in the 1660s

The King sent his brother and heir to Edinburgh largely to remove him from London as a result of the Exclusion Crisis of 1679–1681, during which the English "Country Party" attempted to exclude the openly Catholic James from the three British thrones. He took up residency in Holyrood Palace the early 1680s, running what was in effect a small court.

The dissenters, led by Donald Cargill and Richard Cameron called themselves the Society People, but would become known after their leader as the Cameronians. Reduced in number, hiding out in the moors, they became increasingly radical. On 22 June 1680 the Sanquhar Declaration was posted in Sanquhar, renouncing Charles II as king. Cameron was killed the next month. Cargill excommunicated the king, Duke of Albany and other royalists at the Torwood Conventicle and his followers now separated themselves from all other Presbyterian ministers. Cargill was captured and executed in May 1681. The government passed a Test Act, forcing every holder of public office to take an oath of non-resistance. Eight Episcopal clergy and James Dalrymple, Lord President of the Court of Session resigned and the leading nobleman Archibald Campbell, 9th Earl of Argyll was forced into exile.

In 1684 the remaining Society People posted an Apologetical Declaration on several market crosses, which informed servants of the government that they pursued the lives of its members at the risk of their own. In response to this new element of outright political sedition, the Scottish Privy Council authorised extrajudicial field executions of those caught in arms or those who refused to swear loyalty to the king. This more intense phase of persecution, later known in Protestant historiography as "the Killing Time", led to dissenters being summarily executed by the dragoons of James Graham, Laird of Claverhouse, or sentenced to transportation or death by Sir George Mackenzie, the Lord Advocate.

== James VII and the Glorious Revolution (1685–1689) ==
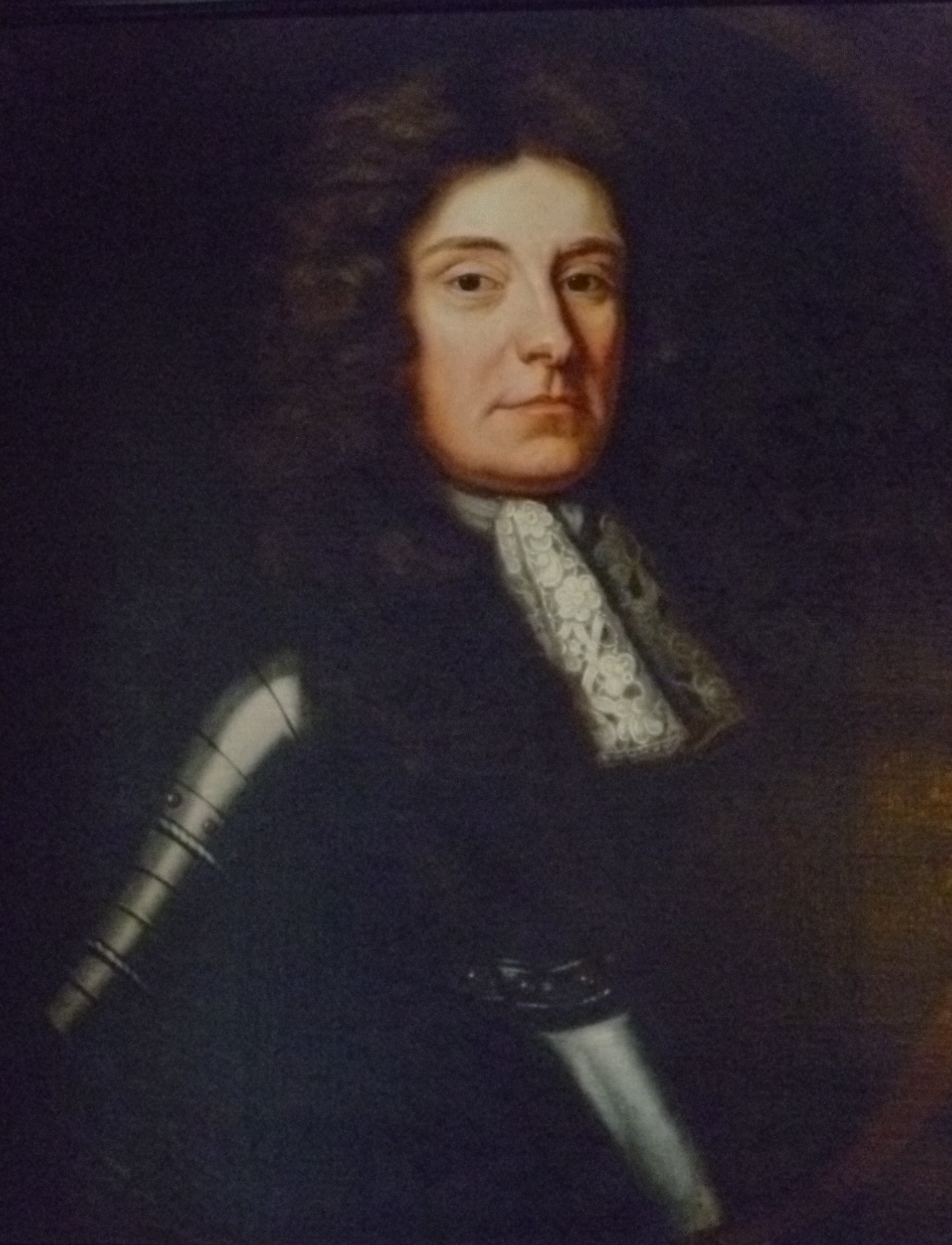
The Earl of Argyll, who was a major supporter of the regime under Charles II but was executed after a rebellion in 1685.

Charles died in 1685 and his brother succeeded him as James VII of Scotland (and II of England). James put Catholics in key positions in the government and even attendance at a conventicle was made punishable by death. He disregarded parliament, purged the council and forced through religious toleration for Roman Catholics, alienating his Protestant subjects. The failure of an invasion, led by the Earl of Argyll and timed to co-ordinate with the Duke of Monmouth's rebellion in England, demonstrated the strength of the regime. However a riot in response to Louis XIV's Revocation of the Edict of Nantes indicated the strength of anti-Catholic feeling. The king's attempts to obtain toleration for Catholics led to the issuing of Letters of Indulgence in 1687, which also allowed freedom of worship to dissident Protestants, allowing "outed" Presbyterian ministers to return to their parishes. This did not extend to field conventicles and the Society People continued to endure hardship, with their last minister, James Renwick, being captured and executed in 1688.

It was believed that the king would be succeeded by his daughter Mary, a Protestant and the wife of William of Orange, Stadtholder of the Netherlands, but when in 1688, James produced a male heir, James Francis Edward Stuart, it was clear that his policies would outlive him. An invitation by seven leading Englishmen led William to land in England with 40,000 men on 5 November. In Edinburgh there were rumours of Orange plots and on 10 December the Lord Chancellor of Scotland, the Earl of Perth, quit the capital for Drummond Castle, planning an abortive escape to Ireland (he was later captured as he embarked for France). As rioters approached Holyrood Abbey they were fired on by soldiers, resulting in some deaths. The city guard was called out, but the Abbey was stormed by a large mob. The Catholic furnishings placed there when it was restored as a chapel for James were torn down and the tombs of the Stuart kings desecrated. A crowd of students burnt the Pope in effigy and took down the heads of executed Covenanters that were hanging above the city gates. The crisis was resolved when James fled from England on 23 December, leading to an almost bloodless revolution. Although there had been no significant Scottish involvement in the coup, most members of the Scottish Privy Council went to London to offer their services to William. On 7 January 1689, they asked William to take over the responsibilities of government.

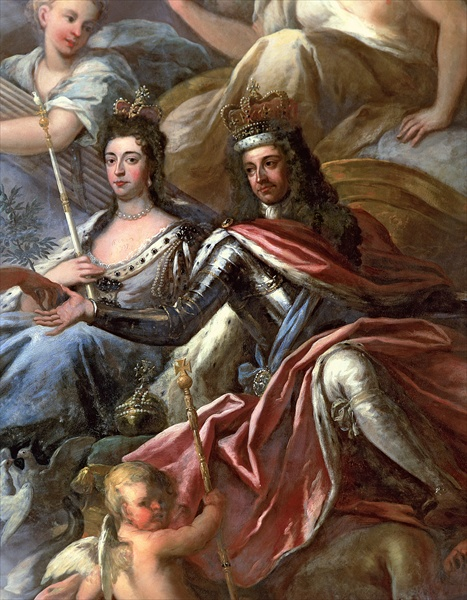
William III and Mary II depicted on the ceiling of the Painted Hall, Greenwich

William called a Scottish Convention, which convened on 14 March in Edinburgh. It was dominated by the Presbyterians. There was a faction that supported James, including many episcopalians, but these were divided by James' attempts to achieve tolerance for Roman Catholics. A letter from James, received on 16 March, contained a threat to punish all who rebelled against him and declaring the assembly illegal, resulted in his followers to abandon the convention, leaving the Williamites dominant. On 4 April the Convention formulated the Claim of Right and the Articles of Grievances. These suggested that James had forfeited the crown by his actions (in contrast to England, which relied on the legal fiction of an abdication) and offered it to William and Mary, which William accepted, along with limitations on royal power. On 11 May William and Mary accepted the Crown of Scotland as co-regents, as William II and Mary II.

The final settlement, completed by William's Second parliament in 1690, restored Presbyterianism and abolished the bishops, who had generally supported James. Remaining ministers outed in 1662 were restored, bringing an end to the persecution of the Cameronians, and leaving only a remnant outside of the church. The General Assembly of 1692 refused to reinstate even those Episcopalian ministers who pledged to accept Presbyterianism. However, the king issued two acts of indulgence in 1693 and 1695, allowing those who accepted him as king to return to the church and around a hundred took advantage of the offer. All but the hardened Jacobites would be given toleration in 1707, leaving only a small remnant of Jacobite episcopalians.

== Economy ==
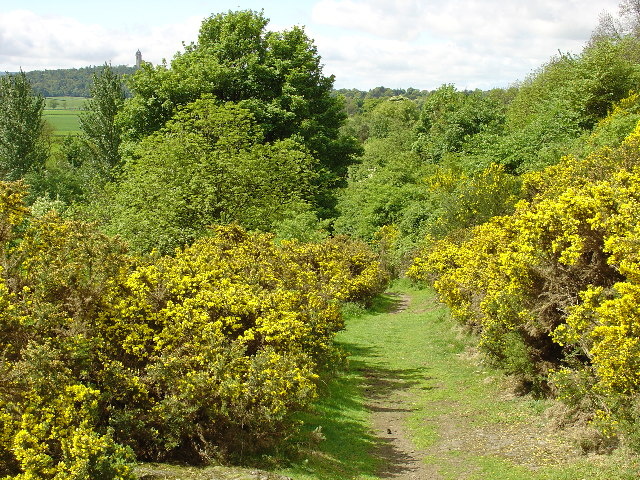
A section of drover's road at Cotkerse near Blairlogie, Scotland

Under the Commonwealth, the country had been relatively highly taxed, but gained access to English markets. After the Restoration the formal frontier with England was re-established, along with its customs duties. Economic conditions were generally favourable from 1660 to 1688, as land owners promoted better tillage and cattle-raising. The monopoly of royal burghs over foreign trade was partially ended by and Act of 1672, leaving them with the old luxuries of wines, silk, spices and dyes and opening up trade of increasingly significant salt, coal, corn and hides and imports from the Americas. The English Navigation Acts limited the ability of the Scots to engage in what would have been lucrative trading with England's growing colonies, but these were often circumvented, with Glasgow becoming an increasingly important commercial centre, opening up trade with the American colonies: importing sugar from the West Indies and tobacco from Virginia and Maryland. Exports across the Atlantic included linen, woollen goods, coal and grindstones. The English protective tariffs on salt and cattle were harder to disregard and probably placed greater limitations on the Scottish economy, despite attempts of the King to have them overturned. Scottish attempts to counter this with tariffs of their own, were largely unsuccessful as Scotland had relatively few vital exports to protect. Attempts by the Privy Council to build up luxury industries in cloth mills, soap works, sugar boiling houses, gunpowder and paper works, proved largely unsuccessful. However, by the end of the century the drovers roads, stretching down from the Highlands through south-west Scotland to north-east England, had become firmly established. Famine had become relatively rare in the second half of the seventeenth century, with only one year of dearth in 1674.

== Society ==
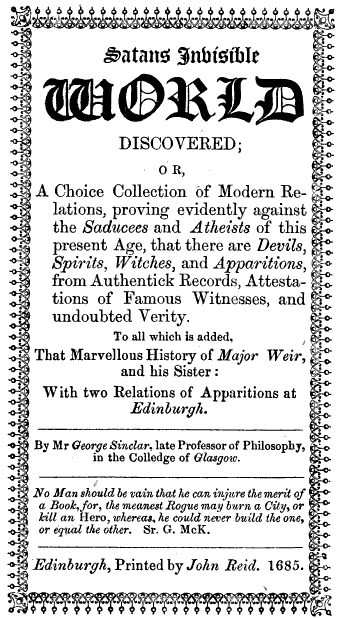
Reprint of the title page of George Sinclair's Satans Invisible World (1685), one of the many tracts published in Scotland arguing against sceptical views of witchcraft

The nobility had been dominant in the politics of Scotland in the first half of the seventeenth century, culminating in their triumph in the period of the Bishops' Wars. However, they lost this status in the Commonwealth period, as the Protectorate regime largely ruled without them. They were restored to authority along with the monarchy and the traditional institutions of the Privy Council and Parliament. However, Rosalind Mitchison argues that their authority was used much more cautiously due to the events of the civil war period. As feudal distinctions declined the barons and tenants-in-chief merged to form the lairds. Under the Commonwealth they had supplied the Justices of the Peace, a post that had enjoyed an expanded role that was only partly reversed at the Restoration. They also gained authority through becoming Commissioner of Supply, a post created in 1667, and which gave them responsibilities for collecting what became the local cess tax. The passing of a series of improving statues, that allowed landholders to move boundaries, roads and carry out enclosures also benefited this group, as did legislation that returned virtual serfdom for groups such as miners and saltworkers.

Scotland had a much higher rate of witchcraft prosecutions for its population than either England or the European average. The overwhelming majority were in the Lowlands, where the kirk had more control, despite the evidence that basic magical beliefs were very widespread in the Highlands. Under the Commonwealth the English judges who took over the running of the legal system were hostile to the use of torture and often sceptical of the evidence it produced, resulting in a decline in witchcraft prosecutions. In an attempt to gain support among the landholding orders, Sheriff's courts were re-established and Justices of the Peace returned in 1656. The result was a wave of witchcraft cases, with 102 in the period 1657–1659. The limitations on prosecutions were fully reversed with the Restoration, and there was a flood of over 600 cases, thought to be the largest outbreak in Scottish history. This alarmed the restored Privy Council, leading it to insist on the necessity of its commission for an arrest or prosecution, and the banning of judicial torture. Prosecutions began to decline as trials were more tightly controlled by the judiciary and government, torture was more sparingly used and standards of evidence were raised. The exposure of prickers as frauds in 1662 removed a major form of evidence. The Lord Advocate George Mackenzie made efforts to make prosecutions ineffective. There may also have been a growing popular scepticism, and, with relative peace and stability, the economic and social tensions that may have contributed to accusations were reduced, although there were occasional local outbreaks until the statute supporting prosecutions was repealed in 1736.

== Culture ==
=== Theatre ===
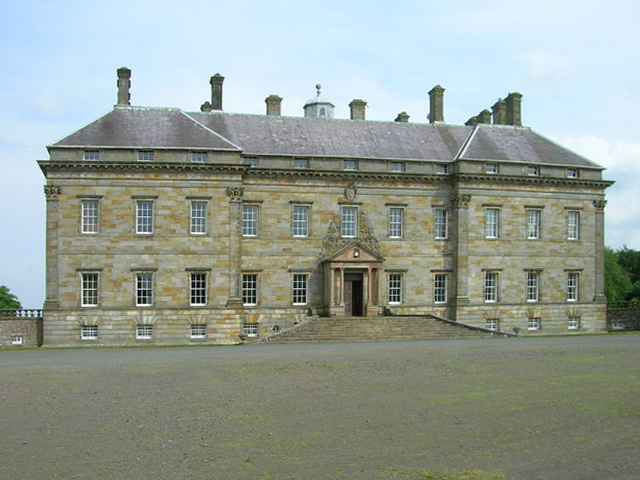
Kinross House, built for himself by William Bruce and one of the first Palladian houses in Britain

The loss of a royal court when James VI inherited the English and Irish thrones in 1603 and the hostility of the Kirk, meant that theatre had struggled to survive in seventeenth-century Scotland. After the Restoration there were attempts to revive Scottish drama. In 1663 Edinburgh lawyer William Clerke wrote Marciano or the Discovery, a play about the restoration of a legitimate dynasty in Florence after many years of civil war. It was performed at the Tennis-Court Theatre at Holyrood Palace before commissioner Rothes. Thomas Sydsurf's Tarugo's Wiles or the Coffee House, was first performed in London in 1667 and then in Edinburgh the year after and drew on Spanish comedy. Sydsurf was also manager from 1667 of the Tennis-Court Theatre and ran a company of players in Edinburgh's Cannongate. The repertoire followed that in London and there were no new Scottish plays after Tarugo's Wiles. The Duke of Albany brought with him a company of actors when he was resident at Holyrood as commissioner. He was also joined by a group of Irish players, who brought their own costumes. He encouraged court masques and seasons of plays at the Tennis-Court Theatre, one of which included acting by Princess Anne, the future Queen Anne.

=== Architecture ===
The Restoration saw the introduction of a style of country house among the Scottish nobility that encouraged a move towards a more leisure-oriented architecture already adopted in continental Europe. Its pioneer was Sir William Bruce (c. 1630–1710) who was the key figure in introducing the Palladian style to the country. Bruce was influenced by English architects Inigo Jones and Christopher Wren (1632–1723), particularly the latter's interpretation of the Baroque. Bruce built and remodelled country houses, including Thirlestane Castle and Prestonfield House. Among his most significant work was his own Palladian mansion at Kinross, built on the Loch Leven estate he had purchased in 1675. As the Surveyor and Overseer of the Royal Works Bruce undertook the rebuilding of the Royal Palace of Holyroodhouse in the 1670s, giving the palace its present appearance. After the death of Charles II in 1685, Bruce lost political favour. James Smith (c. 1645–1731) worked as a mason on Bruce's rebuilding of Holyrood Palace. In 1683 he was appointed Surveyor and Overseer of the Royal Works, responsible for the palace's maintenance. With his father-in-law, the master mason Robert Mylne (1633–1710), Smith worked on Caroline Park in Edinburgh (1685), and Drumlanrig Castle (1680s). Smith's country houses followed the pattern established by Bruce, with hipped roofs and pedimented fronts, in a plain but handsome Palladian style.

=== Art ===
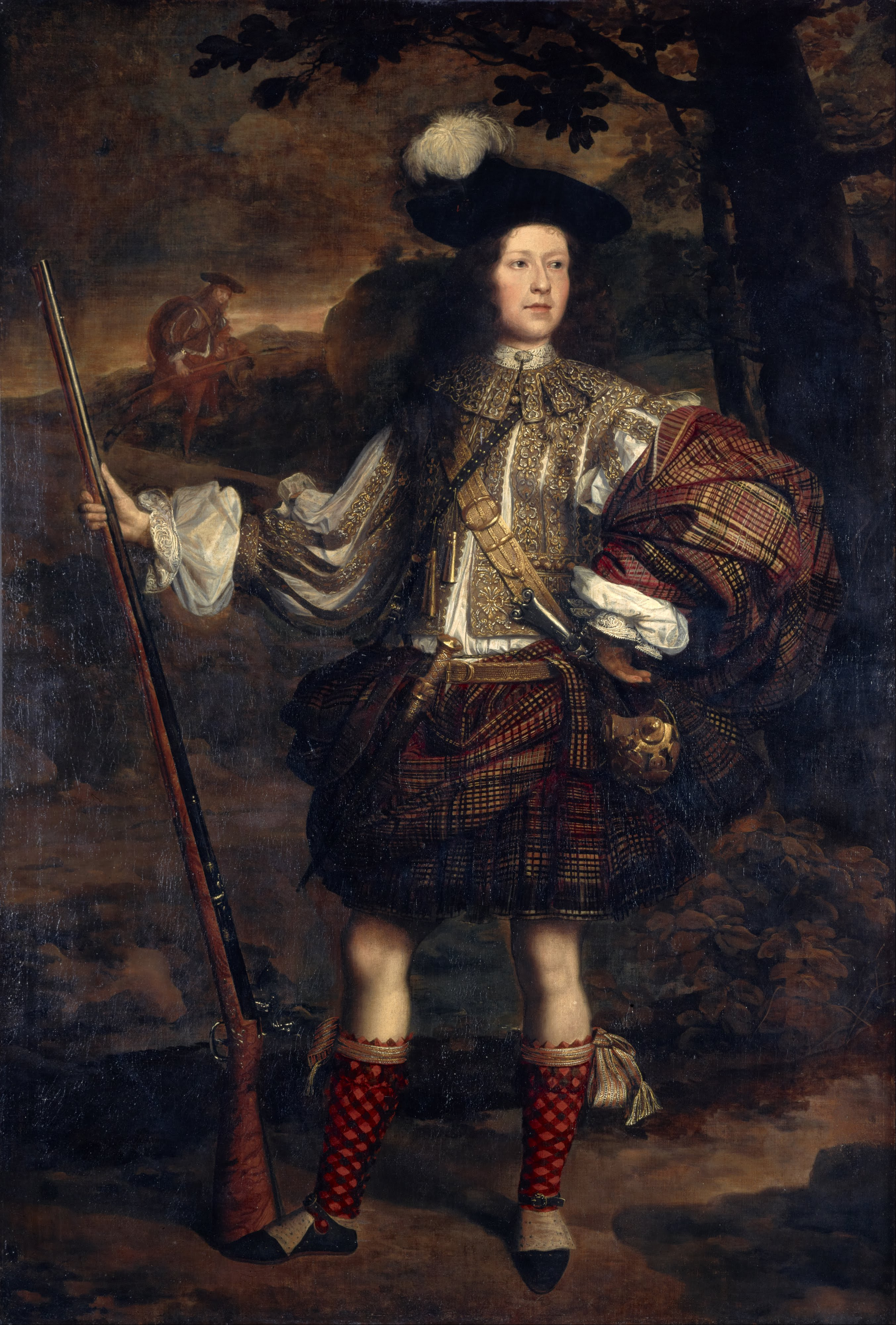
Lord Mungo Murray, by John Michael Wright, an early example of the full-length portrait in Highland dress, c. 1680

Sculpture was dominated by foreign professionals. The equestrian statue of Charles II outside Parliament House (1684/5) was a lead replica of Dutch-born Grinling Gibbons's (1648–1721) bronze statue at Windsor, the first in Britain to depict a monarch in classical dress. John Van Ost (fl. 1680–1729) supplied lead garden statuary for Hopetoun House and Drumlanrig Castle. William Bruce favoured Dutch carvers for his realisation of Kinross House, where there are festoons, trophies and cornucopia around the doorways and gates. These may have included Jan van Sant Voort, a Dutch carver known to have been living in Leith, who supplied Bruce with a carved heraldic overdoor in 1679 and who worked on Bruce's rebuilding of Holyrood Palace. From 1674 the London plasterers George Dunsterfield (fl. 1660–1676) and John Houlbert (fl. 1674–1679) worked for Bruce at Thirlestane, Berwickshire and at Holyroodhouse. Dunsterfield was also active at Balcaskie, Fife and probably at Kellie Castle, Fife.

John Michael Wright (1617–1694) had been trained by the first significant native artist in Scotland, George Jamesone of Aberdeen (1589/90–1644). Wright also studied in Rome with Poussin and Velázquez and painted portraits of both Scottish and English subjects, including his sensitive portrait of William Bruce (1664) and styled himself as "king's painter". His full-length painting of Lord Mungo Murray in Highland dress (c. 1680) is an early example of what became a standard format of Scottish portrait. Also important was the miniaturist David Paton (fl. 1668–1708), who worked mainly in plumbago, but also painted portraits in oil. Visiting artists included Jacob de Wett (c. 1610–c. 1691), who was commissioned in 1684 to paint images of 110 kings for Holyroodhouse and similar work at Glamis Castle.

=== Intellectual life ===
The period between 1679 and 1689 saw the foundation of a large number institutions that would be important in Scottish cultural and intellectual life. These included the Royal College of Physicians in 1681, and three professors of medicine were appointed at the University of Edinburgh in 1685. James VII created the Order of the Thistle in 1687 and the Advocates Library, planned since 1682, was opened in 1689. The offices of Royal Physician, Geographer Royal and Historiographer Royal were founded between 1680 and 1682.

Immediately after the Restoration there was a purge of Presbyterians from the universities, but most of the intellectual advances of the preceding period were preserved. The five Scottish universities recovered from the disruption of the preceding decades with a lecture-based curriculum that was able to embrace economics and science, offering a high-quality liberal education to the sons of the nobility and gentry. All saw the establishment or re-establishment of chairs of mathematics. Astronomy was facilitated by the building of observatories at St. Andrews and at King's and Marischal colleges in Aberdeen. Robert Sibbald was appointed as the first Professor of Medicine at Edinburgh and he co-founded the Royal College of Physicians of Edinburgh in 1681.

== Sources ==
- Aikman, James (1842). Annals of the persecution in Scotland: from the restoration to the revolution. Hugh Paton. pp. 50–51.
- Anderson, R. (2003). "The history of Scottish Education pre-1980". In Bryce, T. G. K.; Humes, W. M. (eds.). Scottish Education: Post-Devolution (2 ed.). Edinburgh University Press. ISBN 0-7486-1625-X.
- Brown, I. (2011). "Public and private performance: 1650–1800". In Brown, I. (ed.). The Edinburgh Companion to Scottish Drama. Edinburgh University Press. ISBN 978-0-7486-4107-9.
- Brown, K. M.; et al., eds. (2007–2012). "Decreet of forfeiture against John Home of Kello (NAS. PA6/16, 21 May 1661)". The Records of the Parliaments of Scotland to 1707. University of St Andrews. Archived from the original on 22 February 2014.
- Clifford, T. (1991). "Introduction". In Pearson, F. (ed.). Virtue and Vision: Sculpture in Scotland 1540–1990. National Galleries of Scotland. ISBN 0-903598-14-0.
- Colvin, H. (1995). A Biographical Dictionary of British Architects, 1600–1840. Yale University Press. ISBN 0-7486-4107-6.
- Crooks, Gordon (ed.). "Covenanter Martyrs". Allison-Antrim Museum. Archived from the original on 15 December 2018.
- Devine, T. M. (2012). "The rise and fall of the Scottish Enlightenment". In Devine, T. M.; Wormald, J. (eds.). The Oxford Handbook of Modern Scottish History. Oxford University Press. ISBN 978-0-19-162433-9.
- Edinburgh Magazine staff (July–December 1819). "December 1819". The Edinburgh magazine, and literary miscellany, a new series of The Scots magazine. Printed for Archibald Constable and Co. p. 582.
- Edwards, K. A. (2010). "Witchcraft in Tudor and Stuart Scotland", in K. Cartwright, ed., A Companion to Tudor Literature Blackwell Companions to Literature and Culture. John Wiley & Sons. ISBN 978-1-4051-5477-2.
- Fenwick, H. (1989). Architect Royal: the Life and Work of Sir William Bruce. Roundwood Press. pp. 73–78. ISBN 0-8390-0156-8.
- Findlay, W. (1998). "Beginnings to 1700" in W. Findley, A History of Scottish Theatre. Edinburgh University Press. ISBN 0-7486-6220-0.
- Gifford, J. (1989). William Adam 1689–1748. Mainstream Publishing/RIAS. ISBN 1-85158-296-7.
- Goodare, J. (2002). "Introduction", in J. Goodare, ed., The Scottish Witch-Hunt in Context. Manchester University Press. ISBN 0-7190-6024-9.
- Gordon, Alexander (1890). "Guthrie, James" . In Stephen, Leslie; Lee, Sidney (eds.). Dictionary of National Biography. Vol. 23. London: Smith, Elder & Co. pp. 237–239.
- Grossman, Mark (2007). World Military Leaders: A Biographical Dictionary. ISBN 978-0-8160-7477-8.
- Harris, Tim (2005). Restoration:Charles II and His Kingdoms 1660–1685. Allen Lane.
- Holfelder, Kyle (1998). Factionalism in the Kirk during the Cromwellian Invasion and Occupation of Scotland, 1650 to 1660: The Protester-Resolutioner Controversy. University of Edinburgh PHD.
- Howie, John; M'Gavin, William (1828). "IV. William Govan". The Scots Worthies: In two volumes. Vol. 2. MacPhun. pp. 73–75.
- Howarth, D. (1991). "Sculpture and Scotland 1540–1700", in F. Pearson, ed., Virtue and Vision: Sculpture in Scotland 1540–1990. National Galleries of Scotland. ISBN 0-903598-14-0.
- Houston, R. A. (2002). Scottish Literacy and the Scottish Identity: Illiteracy and Society in Scotland and Northern England, 1600–1800. Cambridge University Press. ISBN 0-521-89088-8.
- Levak, B. P. (2002). "The decline and end of Scottish witch-hunting", in J. Goodare, ed., The Scottish Witch-Hunt in Context. Manchester University Press. ISBN 0-7190-6024-9.
- Jackson, Clare (2003). Restoration Scotland, 1660–1690: Royalist Politics, Religion and Ideas. Boydell Press.
- Lynch, James (1992). Scotland: a New History. Pimlico. ISBN 0-7126-9893-0.
- Mackie, J. D.; Lenman, B.; Parker, G. (1991). A History of Scotland. Penguin. ISBN 0-14-013649-5.
- Macleod, Donald (Autumn 2009). "The influence of Calvinism on politics" (PDF). Theology in Scotland. XVI (2).
- McCoy, F. N. (1974). Robert Baillie and the Second Scots Reformation. Berkeley CA: University of California Press. ISBN 0-520-02447-8.
- Miller, John (1978). James II; A study in kingship. Menthuen. ISBN 978-0413652904.
- Mitchison, Rosalind (1983). Lordship to Patronage, Scotland 1603–1745. Edinburgh University Press. ISBN 0-7486-0233-X.
- Mitchison, Rosalind (2002). A History of Scotland (3 ed.). Routledge. ISBN 0-415-27880-5.
- Morison, William Maxwell (1803). The decisions of the Court of Session: from its first institution to the present time: digested under proper heads, in the form of a dictionary. Vol. 13. Scotland: Bell. p. 42.
- Morrill, John (1990). Oliver Cromwell and the English Revolution. Longman. ISBN 0582016754.
- Robertson, Barry (2014). Royalists at War in Scotland and Ireland, 1638–1650. Routledge. ISBN 978-1317061069.
- Scottish Parliament (9 September 1662). The king's majesty's gracious and free pardon, act of indemnity and oblivion. The Records of the Parliaments of Scotland to 1707, University of St Andrews.
- Scottish Parliament (September 1662b). Act containing some exceptions from the act of indemnity. The Records of the Parliaments of Scotland to 1707, University of St Andrews.
- Smith, D. J. (2007). "Keyboard music in Scotland: genre, gender, context". In J. Porter (ed.). Defining Strains: The Musical Life of Scots in the Seventeenth Century. Peter Laing. ISBN 978-3-03910-948-7.
- Summerson, J. (1993). Architecture of Britain, 1530–1830 (9 ed.). Yale University Press. ISBN 0-300-05886-1.
- Swinton, Robert Blair (1898). "Swinton, John (1621?-1679)" . In Lee, Sidney (ed.). Dictionary of National Biography. Vol. 55. London: Smith, Elder & Co.
- Thomas, A. (2012). "The Renaissance". In Devine, T. M.; Wormald, J. (eds.). The Oxford Handbook of Modern Scottish History. Oxford University Press. ISBN 978-0-19-162433-9.
- Tobin, T. (1972). The Assembly. Purdue University Press. ISBN 0-911198-30-X.
- Waterhouse, Ellis Kirkham (1994). Painting in Britain, 1530 to 1790. Yale University Press. ISBN 0-300-05833-0.
- Whatley, C. A. (2000). Scottish Society, 1707–1830: Beyond Jacobitism, Towards Industrialisation. Manchester University Press. ISBN 0-7190-4541-X.
- Wormald, J. (1991). Court, Kirk, and Community: Scotland, 1470–1625. Edinburgh University Press. ISBN 0-7486-0276-3.
