= Patrick Gillespie (minister) =

Scottish minister

- Other post: Principal of the University of Glasgow

Personal details
- Born: 1617
- Died: 1675 (aged 57–58)
- Denomination: Presbyterian

Patrick Gillespie (1617–1675) was a Scottish minister, strong Covenanter, and Principal of the University of Glasgow by the support of Oliver Cromwell.

== Life ==
He was the third son of John Gillespie, minister of Kirkcaldy, by his wife Lilias, daughter of Patrick Simson, minister of Stirling; and brother of George Gillespie and the Quaker writer, prophet and preacher Lilias Skene. He was baptised 2 March 1617, was educated at the University of St Andrews, where he graduated in 1635, became minister of the second charge of Kirkcaldy in 1642, and of the High Church of Glasgow in 1648. From that time, he took a very prominent part in public affairs, first as an extreme covenanter, and next as a friend and supporter of Cromwell.

He strenuously opposed the "Engagement" for the rescue of Charles I, helped to overthrow the government that sanctioned it, and advocated severe measures against all 'malignants.' He considered the terms made with Charles II unsatisfactory, and after the battle of Dunbar (3 September 1650) he assembled a meeting of gentlemen and ministers in the west, and persuaded them to raise a separate armed force, which was placed under the command of officers recommended by him. He was the author of the "Western Remonstrance" (December 1650) addressed to parliament by the "gentlemen, commanders, and ministers attending the Westland Force", in which they made charges against the public authorities, condemned the treaty with the king, and declared that they could not take his side against Cromwell. Soon after the commission of assembly passed resolutions in favour of allowing malignants, on the profession of their repentance, to take part in the defence of the country. Against this Gillespie and his friends protested, and when the general assembly met in July 1651 they protested against its legality. For this he and two others were deposed from the ministry. They and their sympathisers disregarded the sentence, and made a schism in the church.

Many of the "Protesters", as the dissenters were called, preferred Cromwell to the king, and some of them became favourable to independency. Gillespie was the leader of this section, and there was no one in Scotland who had more influence with the Protector. His appointment to the principalship of the University of Glasgow followed in 1652, over protests on the grounds that the election belonged to the professors, that he was insufficient in learning, and had been deposed from the ministry. Gillepie took up his post as principal of Glasgow University on 14 February 1653. In 1653 Cromwell turned the general assembly out of doors, and in the following year he called Gillespie and two other protesters to London to consult with them on a new settlement of Scottish ecclesiastical affairs. The result was the appointment of a large commission of protesters, who were empowered to purge the church, and to withhold the stipend from any one appointed to a parish who had not a testimonial from four men of their party. This was known as 'Gillespie's Charter,' hated by the Resolutioners, who formed a majority of the church.

In September 1655, having gone to Edinburgh to preach, Gillespie was interrupted by a part of the congregation, who asked how he dared to appear there, being a deposed minister and traitor. A few weeks later, when preaching in the High Church of Edinburgh (14 October 1655), he prayed for Cromwell, the first to do so publicly in Scotland. About this time he got the synod of Glasgow to annul the sentence of deposition passed by the general assembly, and he was sent as a correspondent to the synod of Lothian, in order to get their act acknowledged; but he was not admitted. Soon after Gillespie and other protesters went to London to seek an increase of power, but John Sharp, who had been sent up by the resolutioners, was there to oppose them. Sharp was backed by the English presbyterians. Gillespie and his friends cultivated the Independents, but they were not successful. Gillespie spent about a year in London, and during this visit was seriously ill. He lived in state, preaching before the Protector in his velvet cassock, and was the intimate friend of John Owen and Nicholas Lockyer, John Lambert and Charles Fleetwood. He obtained from the Protector a large addition of revenue to the university out of church property.

After his return home he quarrelled with the town council, and was libelled for neglect of duty and maladministration of funds, but the accusation was not pushed to extremities. In May 1659 he again visited London, and obtained from Richard Cromwell an addition to his income out of the college revenues. On 28 October 1659 he was desired for the Outer-High Church, Edinburgh. At the Restoration he sent his wife to court to intercede for him. He was deprived of his office, and imprisoned in Stirling Castle. In March 1661 he was brought to trial, when he professed penitence, and threw himself upon the mercy of the court. He had powerful friends, and even Sharp used his influence on his behalf, so that he escaped with a sentence of confinement to Ormiston for a time. The king thought him more guilty than James Guthrie, and said that he would have spared Guthrie's life if he had known that Gillespie was to be treated so leniently. He could obtain no further employment in the ministry, and died at Leith in February 1675. At the university he renewed and enlarged the buildings, and added to its permanent revenues, but left it in debt.

== Works ==
His works were:

- Rulers' Sins the Cause of National Judgments, a sermon, 1650.
- A posthumous work, The Ark of the Testament opened, published in 1677, with a preface by John Owen.

== Bibliography ==
- Baillie's Letters, vol. iii .
- Records of the Kirk
- Lamont and Nicoll's Diaries
- Cook's Hist. of the Church of Scotland
- Life of Archbishop Sharp
- Beattie's Hist. of the Church of Scotland during the Commonwealth

Academic offices
| Preceded by Robert Ramsay | Principal of the University of Glasgow; 1653–1660 | Succeeded by Robert Baillie |
