= Battle of Annan Moor =

Battle of the Scottish civil war

Coordinates: 54.990°N 3.242°W

- Part of the War of the Three Kingdoms
Date	20–21 October 1645
Location	Annan, Dumfriesshire, Scotland
Result	Scottish victory

Belligerents
Scottish Covenanters	English Royalists

Commanders and leaders
Sir John Brown	Lord Digby; Marmaduke Langdale

Strength
Unknown	c. 600

Casualties and losses
Minimal	High

The Battle of Annan Moor took place during the Scottish civil war, part of the intertwined Wars of the Three Kingdoms that took place in England, Ireland, and Scotland between 1639 and 1651.

The Royalist army led by Lord Digby and Marmaduke Langdale had been trying to force a passage north to link up with the Marquis of Montrose. The battle took place on 20 and 21 October 1645 when the experienced cavalry commander Sir John Brown of Fordell and his newly raised Scots cavalry regiment defeated the Royalists army. The Royalists lost more than half of their 600 men as casualties or prisoners. The remainder of the Royalist were driven back into England.

== Sources ==
- Furgol, E., A Regimental History of the Covenanting armies (John Donald, 1990).
