= Battle of Hieton =

Battle during the Anglo-Scottish war of 1650–1652

- Part of the Anglo-Scottish war of 1650–1652
Date	1 December 1650
Location	Cadzow Burn, near the present day town centre of Hamilton, Scotland 55°46′36″N 4°02′20″W
Result	Commonwealth victory

Belligerents
Scottish Remonstrants	Commonwealth

Commanders and leaders
Gilbert Ker	John Lambert

Strength
Unknown	1,000

Casualties and losses
Heavy	Slight

Registered battlefield
- Official name: Battle of Hieton
- Designated: 30 November 2011
- Reference no.: BTL23
- The site of the battle within southern Scotland

The Battle of Hieton was fought on the 1 December 1650 between a force of Scottish Remonstrants under Colonel Gilbert Ker and 1,000 English commanded by Major-general John Lambert. The site of the battle was by the Cadzow Burn, near the present day town centre of Hamilton, Scotland. The Scots attacked, surprising the English, but were beaten back and destroyed as a fighting force. The battle was part of the Anglo-Scottish war of 1650–1652.

== Background ==
After the bloodshed of the First and Second English Civil Wars the New Model Army of the victorious Parliamentarians was exasperated by the intransigence of King Charles I. They purged the English Parliament and established the Rump Parliament, which had Charles tried for treason against the English people. Charles was executed on 30 January 1649, and the republican Commonwealth was created. As well as having been king of England Charles had also been, separately, king of Scotland. The Scottish Parliament was not consulted prior to the King's execution. It declared his son, also Charles, King of Britain (not Scotland) and set about rapidly recruiting an army to support the new king, under the command of the experienced general, David Leslie. The leaders of the English Commonwealth felt threatened and despatched the New Model Army, commanded by Oliver Cromwell, on an invasion of Scotland in July 1650, starting the Anglo-Scottish war of 1650–1652.

== Prelude ==
Cromwell manoeuvred around Edinburgh, attempting to bring the Scots to battle, but he was not able to draw Leslie out. On 31 August Cromwell withdrew to Dunbar. Believing the English army was in a hopeless situation and under pressure to finish it off rapidly, Leslie moved his troops into a position to attack Dunbar. On the night of 2/3 September Cromwell manoeuvred his army so as to be able to launch a concentrated pre-dawn attack against the Scottish right wing. The Scots were decisively defeated. Leslie executed a fighting withdrawal, but some 6,000 Scots, from his army of 12,000, were taken prisoner, and approximately 1,500 killed or wounded.

Following this defeat the Scots, accompanied by King Charles II, established a new defensive line at the strategic choke point of Stirling. Dunbar caused great damage to Leslie's reputation and authority. He attempted to resign as head of the army, but the Scottish government would not permit it, largely because of a lack of any plausible replacement. Several of his officers refused to take orders from him, and left to join a new army being raised by the Western Association. Divisions already present in the Scottish government were widened by the new situation. The more practical blamed the purges for Leslie's defeat, and looked to bring disenchanted Scots back into the army; the more dogmatic thought God had deserted them because the army had not been sufficiently purged of godlessness, and argued that too much faith had been put in a worldly prince who was not sufficiently committed to the cause of the Covenant. These more radical elements issued the divisive Western Remonstrance, which castigated the government for its failure to properly purge the army, and further widened the rifts between the Scots. The Remonstrants, as this group became known, took command of the Western Association army, and attempted to negotiate with the English commander, Cromwell. They urged him to depart Scotland and leave them in control.

== Battle ==
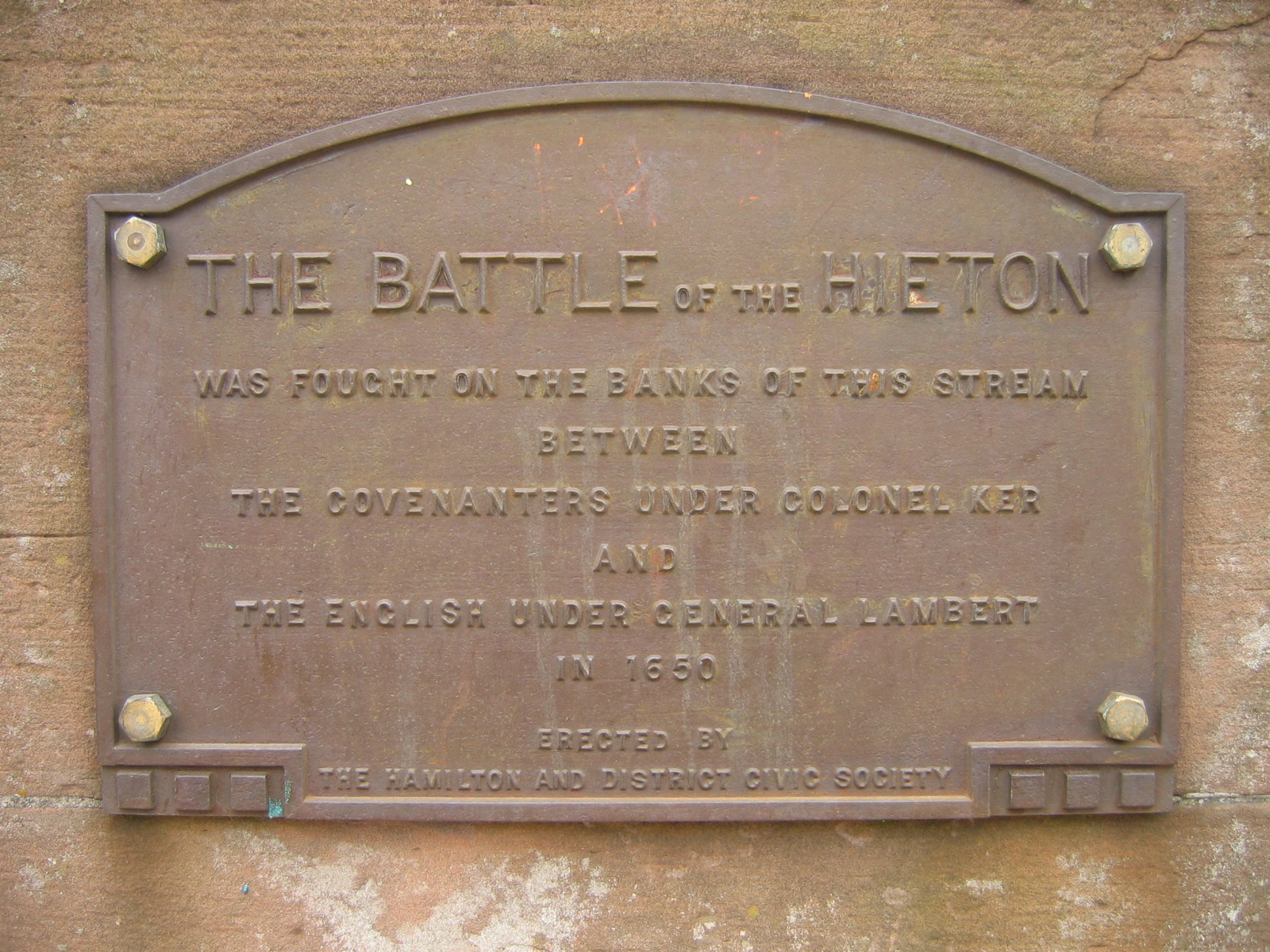
Plaque commemorating the Battle of the Hieton

Cromwell rejected their advances and sent 1,000 men under Major-general John Lambert to confront them. The Remonstrants, led by Colonel Gilbert Ker, attacked the English at the Hieton (Scots for 'high town') area of modern Hamilton on 1 December 1650. Their surprise attack gained initial success, but the English regrouped and drove back the Scots with heavy losses, destroying their army as a fighting force. Ker was wounded and captured.

Today the battle site is occupied by Hamilton's Common Green, with the 19th-century Cadzow Bridge overhead. A plaque on the bridge commemorates the battle, and was installed by Hamilton Civic Society.

== Aftermath ==
In July 1651 the English forced a crossing of the Firth of Forth and defeated the Scots at the Battle of Inverkeithing. Cromwell ignored the Scottish army at Stirling and marched on the seat of the Scottish government at Perth, which he besieged. Perth surrendered after two days, cutting off the Scottish army from reinforcements, provisions and materiel. In desperation Charles and Leslie decided that their only chance was to invade England in the hope that the populace would rise to support the King and so took their army south. Cromwell and Lambert followed, leaving General George Monck with 6,000 of the least experienced men to mop up what Scottish resistance remained. Monck did this in short order while the Scots under Charles and Leslie penetrated into England as far as Worcester. There the stronger English army, which was better trained, better equipped and better supplied, cut the Scots' line of retreat and on 3 September attacked and crushed them at the Battle of Worcester. Charles was one of the few to escape death or capture.

== Citations and sources ==
=== Sources ===
- Brooks, Richard (2005). Cassell's Battlefields of Britain and Ireland. London: Weidenfeld & Nicolson. ISBN 978-0-304-36333-9.
- Coward, Barry (2003). The Stuart Age: England 1603–1714. Harlow: Pearson Education Ltd. ISBN 978-0-582-77251-9.
- Dow, F.D. (1979). Cromwellian Scotland 1651-1660. Edinburgh: John Donald Publishers. ISBN 978-0-85976-049-2.
- Edwards, Peter (2002). "Logistics and Supply". In Kenyon, John & Ohlmeyer, Jane (eds.). The Civil Wars: A Military History of England, Scotland and Ireland 1638–1660. Oxford: Oxford University Press. pp. 234–271. ISBN 978-0-19-280278-1.
- Furgol, Edward (2002). "The Civil Wars in Scotland". In Kenyon, John & Ohlmeyer, Jane (eds.). The Civil Wars: A Military History of England, Scotland and Ireland 1638–1660. Oxford: Oxford University Press. pp. 41–72. ISBN 978-0-19-280278-1.
- Gentles, Ian (2002). "The Civil Wars in England". In Kenyon, John & Ohlmeyer, Jane (eds.). The Civil Wars: A Military History of England, Scotland and Ireland 1638–1660. Oxford: Oxford University Press. pp. 103–154. ISBN 978-0-19-280278-1.
- Kenyon, John & Ohlmeyer, Jane (2002). "The Background to the Civil Wars in the Stuart Kingdoms". In Kenyon, John & Ohlmeyer, Jane (eds.). The Civil Wars: A Military History of England, Scotland and Ireland 1638–1660. Oxford: Oxford University Press. pp. 3–40. ISBN 978-0-19-280278-1.
- "History - Battle of Hieton". Friends of Cadzow Glen. Low Parks Museum.
- Ohlmeyer, Jane (2002). "The Civil Wars in Ireland". In Kenyon, John & Ohlmeyer, Jane (eds.). The Civil Wars: A Military History of England, Scotland and Ireland 1638–1660. Oxford: Oxford University Press. pp. 73–102. ISBN 978-0-19-280278-1.
- Reese, Peter (2006). Cromwell's Masterstroke: The Battle of Dunbar 1650. Barnsley: Pen & Sword. ISBN 978-1-84415-179-0.
- Reid, Stuart (2008) [2004]. Dunbar 1650: Cromwell's Most Famous Victory. Oxford: Osprey Publishing. ISBN 978-1-84176-774-1.
- Royle, Trevor (2005) [2004]. Civil War: The Wars of the Three Kingdoms, 1638–1660. London: Abacus. ISBN 978-0-349-11564-1.
- Wanklyn, Malcolm (2019). Parliament's Generals: Supreme Command and Politics During the British Wars 1642–51. Barnsley: Pen & Sword Military. ISBN 978-1-47389-836-3.
- Woolrych, Austin (2002). Britain in Revolution 1625–1660. Oxford: Oxford University Press. ISBN 978-0-19-820081-9.
