= Robert Hackett (soldier) =

Scottish soldier

Robert Hacket (born 1617) was a Scottish soldier in the Wars of the Three Kingdoms.

He was involved with the Western Association (Scotland).

As a lieutenant-colonel, he was the second-in-command of the army of the Scottish Parliament at the Battle of Carbisdale.

He later became an elder at the church in Lochhead (Campbeltown), Argyll in 1658.
