= Gilbert Ker =

17th-century Scottish soldier

Gilbert Ker was a Scottish soldier in the Wars of the Three Kingdoms.

He was involved with the Western Association (Scotland). As a colonel, he led the Scottish army defeated at the Battle of Hieton in 1650, where he was wounded and captured.
