= Malignants =

Malignants is a name used for the advisors of Charles I of England, chief among whom were Thomas Wentworth, 1st Earl Strafford and William Laud, Archbishop of Canterbury. The term was used by the Parliamentarians, who blamed them for the evils of the country; the name was afterwards applied to the whole Royalist party.

== See also ==
- Royalist "Delinquents" and Committee for Compounding with Delinquents
