= Western Remonstrance =

Scottish historical event in 1650

The Western Remonstrance was drawn up on 17 October 1650 by Scotsmen who demanded that the Act of Classes (1649) was enforced (removing Engagers from the army and other influential positions) and remonstrating against Charles, the son of the recently beheaded King Charles I, being crowned King of Scotland. (Note: Oxford English Dictionary defines remonstrance, n. as: "A formal statement of grievances or similar matters of public importance, presented to a governing body or monarch; a petition." (OED staff 2011, "remonstrance, noun").) It was presented to the Committee of Estates by Sir George Maxwell, at Stirling, on 22nd of that month. Those who supported the Remonstrance are known as Remonstrants, or Remonstraters.

== Remonstrance ==
Patrick Gillespie was the principal author of the remonstrance addressed to the Scottish Parliament by the "gentlemen, commanders, and ministers attending the Westland Force", in which they made charges against the public authorities, condemned the treaty with Charles II, and declared that they could not take his side against Oliver Cromwell.

The Remonstrators declared "freely and faithfully concerning the causes and remedies of the Lord's indignation", which had gone out against his people, among the first of which they reckoned the backsliding from the National Covenant, "the great and mother sin of the nation", as the principal. The chief remedy proposed was to remove from the presence of the king, the judicatories and the armies, the "malignants", whom many of the committee were accused of having received "hito intimate friendship", admitting them to their councils, and bringing in some of them to the parliament and committees, and about the king, thereby affording "many pregnant presumptions", of a design on the part of some of the committee of estates, "to set up and employ the malignant party", or at least, giving "evidences of a strong inclination to intrust them again in the managing of the work of God".

The Committee of Estates ignored the first remonstrance, a circumstance which gave such umbrage to Archibald Johnston, Lord Warriston and the leaders of the Western Association army, that they drew up another, couched in still stronger language, on 30 October, at Dumfries, where they had retired with the army on a movement made by Oliver Cromwell's New Model Army to the west.

In this fresh remonstrance, the Remonstraters declared that as it was now manifest that the king was opposed to the work of God and the covenants, and cleaving to the enemies of both, they would not regard him or his interest in their quarrel with the invading English; that the king ought not to be trusted in Scotland with the exercise of his power until he gave proofs of a real change in his conduct; and that an effectual course ought to be taken for preventing "his conjunction with the malignant party", and for investigating into the cause of his late flight; and that the malignants should be rendered incapable in future of hurting the work and people of God.

A petition was presented to the Committee of Estates on the 19 November, requiring a satisfactory answer to the first remonstrance. On 25 November, a joint declaration was issued by the King and the Committee. They declared that "the said paper, as it related to the parliament and civil judicatories, to be scandalous and injurious to his majesty's person, and prejudicial to his authority"; and the commission of the General Assembly having been required to give their opinion upon the remonstrance, in so far as it related to religion and church judicatories, acknowledged that, although it contained "many sad truths in relation to the sins charged upon the king, his family, and the public judicatories", which they were "resolved to hold out, and press upon them in a right and orderly, way", together with such other sins as by impartial search, and the help of the Lord's Spirit, on their endeavours therein, they should find, nevertheless, the commission declared itself dissatisfied with the remonstrance, which it considered "apt to breed division in kirk and kingdom".

== Aftermath ==
The declaration of the commission of the General Assembly was not only approved of by the General Assembly, but what was of equal importance, the General Assembly passed a resolution declaring that in such a perilous crisis all Scotsmen might be employed to defend their country (and so giving support to the annulment of the Act of Classes (1649) which had impeded Engagers and Royalists from joining in the resistance to the English Invasion). An exception for persons "excommunicated, forfeited, notoriously profane, or flagitious, and professed enemies and opposers of the covenant and cause of God", was no doubt made, but this exemption did not exclude all the "malignants". The rescinding of the Act of Classes took effect on 13 August 1650.

Gillespie and other Remonstraters protested against the General Assembly resolution, and when the General Assembly met in July 1651 they protested against its legality. For this he and two others were deposed from the ministry. They and their sympathisers disregarded the sentence, and made a schism in the church.

Gillespie and those who held similar views would become known as Protestors for protesting against the resolution to rescind the act, while those who supported the resolution to rescind the act would become known as Resolutioners.

The divisions in the Kirk and the Scottish Nation made the subjugation of Scotland easier for the English both militarily as the New Model Army could engage and defeat disparate Scottish armies in detail, and politically the English Commonwealth was able use the disunity to gain a political advantage over both parties.

== See also ==
- Third Civil War in Scotland in the Wars of the Three Kingdoms
- English invasion of Scotland in Third English Civil War
- Battle of Dunbar (1650)
