= Act of Classes =

Former Scottish Law (1649–1650)

The Act of Classes was passed by the Parliament of Scotland on 23 January 1649. It was probably drafted by Lord Warriston, a leading member of the Kirk Party, who along with the Marquess of Argyll were leading proponents of its clauses. It banned Royalists and those who had supported the Engagement from holding public office including positions in the army. Against sizeable opposition the rescinding of the Act took effect on 13 August 1650.

== Royalists banned from holding public office ==
The act banned Royalists from holding public office. Its broad wording not only banned those who had fought with or supported Royalists such as Marquess of Montrose, it also banned those who had supported the Engagement (now discredited and political weakened after the Engager's army's defeat at the Battle of Preston (1648)), those who had not vehemently protested against the Engagement and those not of upright character.

== Rescinding ==
The rescinding of the Act of Classes in 1651 led to a serious breach in the ranks of the Scottish clergy. The Resolutioners, or supporters of the resolution to rescind that act (such as James Sharp), were opposed by the Protesters, the rigid adherents to the strictest interpretation of the Covenant (such as Patrick Gillespie and James Guthrie). The period of the Commonwealth was filled with the strife between these two parties, its bitterness not lessened by the fact that the assembly, dissolved in 1653 by Cromwell's soldiers, was not allowed to meet again in his protectorate.

== See also ==
- Third Civil War in Scotland in the Wars of the Three Kingdoms
- English invasion of Scotland in Third English Civil War
- Western Remonstrance
