= Robert Baillie =

17th-century Scottish Christian writer

The Reverend Robert Baillie
- Other post: Principal of the University of Glasgow

Personal details
- Born: 30 April 1602
- Died: 1662 (aged 59–60)
- Denomination: Presbyterian
- Education: University of Glasgow

Robert Baillie (30 April 1602 – 1662) was a Church of Scotland minister who became famous as an author and a propagandist for the Covenanters.

In Baillie's engagement with the theological and liturgical controversies of the mid-Seventeenth Century, Baillie sought to reconcile his strong belief in maintaining Kirk unity with a firm adherence to a Christian doctrine dictated by the divine 'truth' revealed in Scripture.

Two large volumes of Baillie's sermons survive in manuscript. He was also conscientious in ensuring that copies were made of his outgoing correspondence and other documents with a view to creating a body of evidence which could be used to prepare a historical account of the Covenanters. This material remains a valuable source for historians of the period.

== Life ==
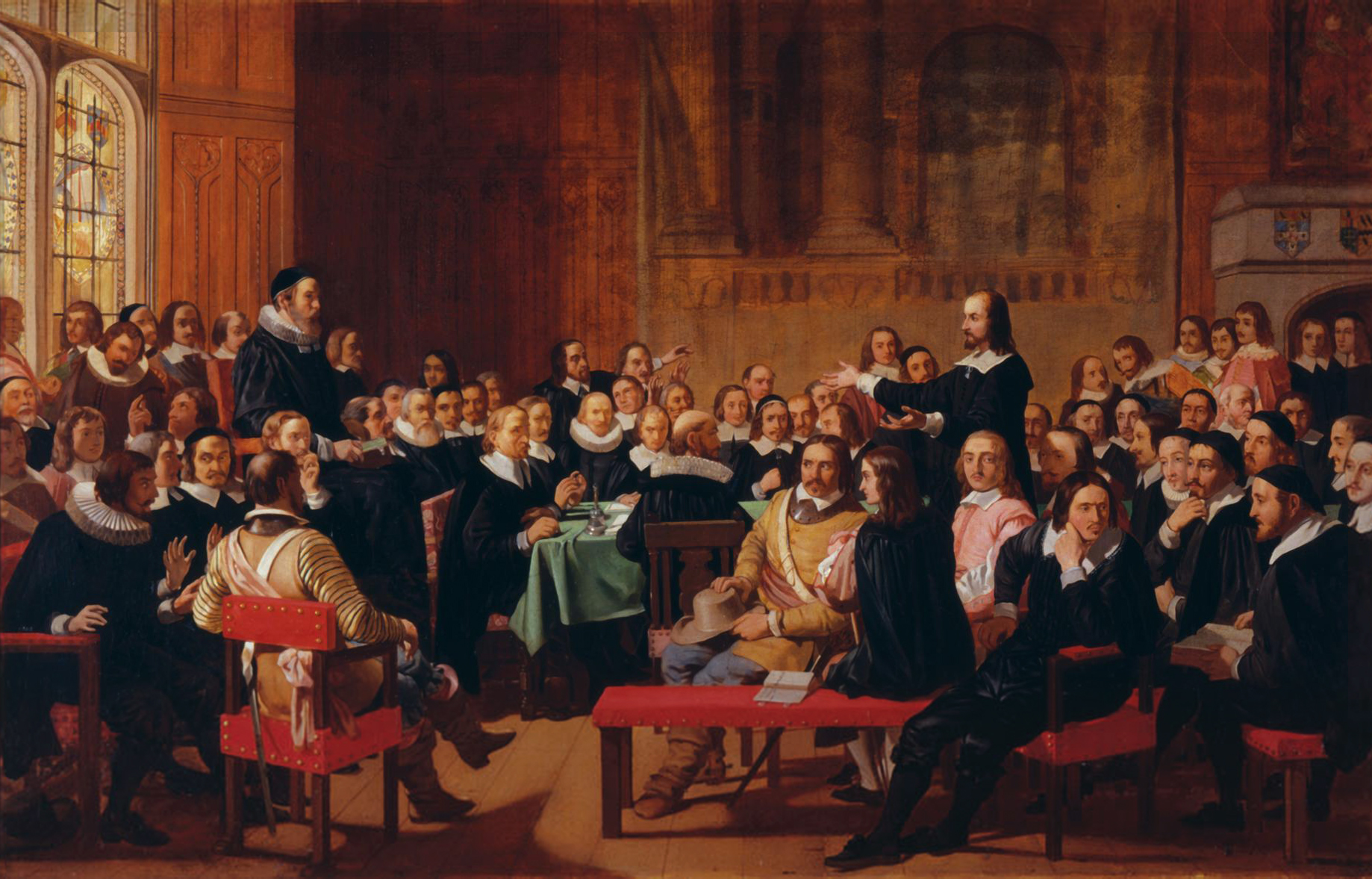
Assertion of Liberty of Conscience by the Independents of the Westminster Assembly of Divines, 1847, Palace of Westminster

Baillie was born in the Saltmarket, Glasgow, the eldest son of James Baillie, a merchant and burgess of Glasgow, and his wife, Helen Gibson. He was educated at the High School of Glasgow and the University of Glasgow, graduating with an M.A. in 1620. He was licensed by Archbishop James Law and became a regent of Philosophy in the University, and tutor to the son of Alexander Montgomery, 6th Earl of Eglinton. He was ordained to Kilwinning on 25 May 1631 and admitted burgess of Glasgow 6 July 1631. In 1638 he represented the Presbytery of Irvine at the Glasgow Assembly, when Presbyterianism was re-established in Scotland. In 1639 he accompanied Lord General Alexander Leslie and the Scottish army as chaplain to Lord Eglinton's Regiment during the Bishops' Wars. In 1640 he was appointed by the Covenanters to draw up an accusation against Archbishop Laud. On 11 August 1642 he was translated to the Tron Kirk in Glasgow. In the same year, Baillie was made Professor of Divinity at the University of Glasgow, holding the chair jointly with David Dickson. In 1643 he was selected as one of the five Scottish clergymen who were sent to the Westminster Assembly. In January 1647 he presented the completed Confession of Faith and a version of the Psalms in metre to the General Assembly of the Church of Scotland.

In 1649, Baillie was one of the commissioners sent to Holland for the purpose of inviting Charles II to Scotland, and of settling the terms of his admission to the government. He continued to take an interest in religious controversies during the Interregnum, but was not active politically. In 1661 he was made Principal of the University of Glasgow in place of Patrick Gillespie. He died the following year, in August 1662.

== Liturgical controversies ==
Baillie accepted the liturgical changes introduced by James VI's Articles of Perth (1618), even elaborating an exhaustive defence of kneeling at communion in protracted correspondence with David Dickson, the minister for the parish of Irvine. However, he denounced William Laud's Scottish Prayer Book (1637) as "popish" and "idolatrous". His critical analysis of the intentions of its Canterburian authors is set out in his A parallel or briefe comparison of the liturgie with the masse-book, the breviarie, the ceremoniall, and other Romish rituals and Ladensium autakakrisis of 1641.

== Cromwellian invasion ==
In the Resolutioner versus Protester schism in the Church of Scotland during the Cromwellian invasion of Scotland, Baillie sided with the Resolutioners. His ecclesiology saw the church as an ecclesia mixta, comprising both reprobate and elect. He rejected the Protestors' more exclusive vision of a church of visible saints in which membership (and by extension the ability to hold church office) should be restricted to godly "true" believers. Baillie's concern was to maintain church unity and combat the threat posed by sectarians.

Of the Resolutioners, Robert Douglas was, by head and shoulders, the acknowledged leader. His ministerial supporters included David Dickson, Baillie, and James Wood. Among the Protesters the most outstanding ministers were James Guthrie, Samuel Rutherfurd, Andrew Cant, Patrick Gillespie, and John Livingstone; and, of the elders, Wariston and Sir John Cheisly; the two most strenuous fighters being Guthrie and Wariston.

Baillie's mentor Robert Blair urged him to disengage from the Resolutioner – Protestor conflict and concentrate on his academic writing. Accordingly, during the 1650s Baillie immersed himself in his teaching at the University of Glasgow and writing treatises on Hebrew and biblical chronology.

== Restoration ==
In correspondence with William Cunningham, 9th Earl of Glencairn, John Maitland, 2nd Earl of Lauderdale and James Sharp after the Restoration, Baillie made it clear that he thought the episcopal settlement Charles II imposed on Scotland was a mistake, but he did not oppose the return of bishops publicly. When, in 1662, he met Andrew Fairfoul, the recently consecrated Archbishop of Glasgow, he greeted him cordially, but made a point of not acknowledging his status.

== Works ==
A complete memoir and a full notice of his writings can be found in David Laing's edition of the Letters and Journals of Robert Baillie (1637–1662), Bannatyne Club, 3 vols. (Edinburgh, 1841–1842). Among his works are Ladensium αὐτοκατάκρισις, an answer to Lysimachus Nicanor by John Corbet in the form of an attack on Laud and his system, in reply to a publication which charged the Covenanters with Jesuitry; Anabaptism, the true Fountain of Independency, Brownisme, Antinomy, Familisme, etc., a sermon [in which he criticises the rise of the early Baptist churches in England such as those led by Thomas Lambe]; An Historical Vindication of the Government of the Church of Scotland; The Life of William (Laud) now Lord Archbishop of Canterbury Examined (London, 1643); A Parallel of the Liturgy with the Mass Book, the Breviary, the Ceremonial and other Romish Rituals (London, 1661).

- La densivm AUTOKATAKRISIS : the Canterburians self-conviction ... : with a postscript for the personat Jesuite Lysimachus Nicanor (1641) https://archive.org/details/ladensivmautokat00bail
- A dissuasive from the errours of the time : wherein the tenets of the principall sects, especially of the Independents, are drawn together in one map, for the most part in the words of their own authours and their maine principles are examined by the touch-stone of the Holy Scrptures [sic] (1645) https://archive.org/details/dissuasivefromer00bail
- Errours and induration are the great sins and the great judgements of the time : preached in a sermon before the Right Honourable House of Peers, in the Abbey-Church at Westminster, 30 July 1645, the day of the monethly fast (1645) https://archive.org/details/erroursind00bail
- Operis historici et chronologici libri duo : in quibus historia sacra & profana compendiosè deducitur ex ipsis fontibus, a creatione mundi ad Constantinum Magnum, & quaestiones ac dubia chronologica, quae ex V. & N. Testamento moveri solent, breviter & perspicuè explicantur & vindicantur. Una cum tribus diatribis ... (MDCLXVIII [1668]) https://archive.org/details/operishistoricie00bail
- The letters and journals of Robert Baillie ... 1637–1662 (Volume 1) (1841)
- The letters and journals of Robert Baillie ... 1637–1662 (Volume 2) (1841)
- The letters and journals of Robert Baillie ... 1637–1662 (Volume 3) (1841)

== Family ==
Baillie married

- (1st) 1631, Lilias Fleming of the family of Cardarroch, parish of Cadder, who died 7 June 1653, and had issue –
  - Lilias (married, cont. 7 and 16 January 1657, William Eccles, minister of Ayr)
  - Helen, baptised 20 January 1644
  - Elizabeth, baptised 23 October 1647
  - other three children
- (2nd) 1656, Helen (died February 1679), daughter of John Strang, D.D., Principal of the University of Glasgow, and widow of James Elliot, D.D., minister of Trinity Parish, Edinburgh, and had issue –
  - Margaret, baptised 21 July 1657 (married John Walkinshaw of Barrowfield and Camlachie, and was ancestress of Clementina Mary Sophia Walkinshaw, mistress of Prince Charles Edward).

== Bibliography ==
- Ladensium avTOKaraKpitris : the Canterburian's Self -Conviction, An Evident Demonstration of the Avowed Arminianisme, Poperie, and Tyrannie of the Faction, by their oione Confessions; with a Postcript to the Personat Jesuite Lysimachus Nicanor, a prime Canterburian [anon.] (Amsterdam, 1640, 3rd ed., London, 1641);
- A Parallel or Brief e Comparison of the Liturgie with the Masse-Book, the Breviarie, the Ceremoniall, and other Bomish Ritualls (London, 1641);
- An Antidote against Arminianisme (London, 1641);
- The Unlawfulness and Danger of Limited Episcopacie [in support of Alexander Henderson's Tract on the "Unlawfulness and Danger of Limited Prelacie"] [anon.] (1641);
- Satan the Leader-in-Chief to all who resist the Reparation of Sion; as it was cleared in a Sermon to the Honourable House of Commons at their late Solemn Fast, 28th Feb. 1643 (London, 1643);
- Errours and Induration are the great Sins and the great Judgments of the Time; preached in a Sermon before the Right Honourable the House of Peers in the Abbey Church of Westminster, 30 July 1645 (London, 1645);
- A Dissuasive from the Errours of the Time; wherein the Tenets of the Principall Sects, especially of the Independents, are drawn together in a Map (London, 1645);
- An Historical Vindication of the Government of the Church of Scotland from the manifold base Calumnies which the most malignant of the Prelates did invent of old, and now lately have been published with great industry in two pamphlets at London; the one intitided "Issachar's Burden," etc., written and published at Oxford by John Maxwell, a Scottish Prelate, etc. (London, 1646);
- Anabaptisme, the True Fountains of Independency, Brownisme, Antinomy, Familisme, etc., or a Second Part of the Dissuasive from the Errours of the Time (London, 1647);
- A Review of Dr Bramble [Branihall], late Bishop of Londonderry, his Faire Warning against the Scotes Disciplin (Delf, 1649);
- Appendix Practica ad Joannis Buxtorfii Epitomen Grammaticae Hebraeae [anon.] (Edinburgh, 1653);
- Catachesis Elenetica Error-urn qui hodie vexant Ecclesiam (London, 1654);
- The Dissuasive from the Errours of the i Time, vindicated from the Exceptions of Mr Cotton and Mr Tombes (London, 1655);
- Operis Historei et Chronologei Libri Duo (Amsterdam, 1663);
- Letters and Journals, 1637–1662, 2 vols. (Edinburgh, 1775) [edited by David Laing], 3 vols. (Bannatyne Club, Edinburgh, 1841-2).
- MSS. of Baillie are preserved in Glasgow and Edinburgh University Libraries, and in the National Library of Scotland.

== Sources ==
- Anderson, William (1877). "Baillie, Robert". The Scottish nation: or, The surnames, families, literature, honours, and biographical history of the people of Scotland. Vol. 1. A. Fullarton & co. p. 174-177. This article incorporates text from this source, which is in the public domain.
- Baillie, Robert (1841–1842a). Laing, David (ed.). The letters and journals of Robert Baillie ... M.DC.XXXVII.-M.DC.LXII. Vol. 1. Edinburgh: R. Ogle.
- Baillie, Robert (1841–1842b). Laing, David (ed.). The letters and journals of Robert Baillie ... M.DC.XXXVII.-M.DC.LXII. Vol. 2. Edinburgh: R. Ogle.
- Baillie, Robert (1841–1842c). Laing, David (ed.). The letters and journals of Robert Baillie ... M.DC.XXXVII.-M.DC.LXII. Vol. 3. Edinburgh: R. Ogle.
- Blair, Robert (1754). Memoirs of the life of Mr. Robert Blair. Edinburgh: Printed by David Paterson.
- Blair, Robert; M'Crie, Thomas (1848). The life of Mr. Robert Blair, minister of St. Andrews, containing his autobiography, from 1593 to 1636 : with supplement of his life and continuation of the history of the times, to 1680. Edinburgh: Wodrow Society.
- Brodie, Alexander; Laing, David (1863). The diary of Alexander Brodie of Brodie, MDCLII-MDCLXXX. and of his son, James Brodie of Brodie, MDCLXXX-MDCLXXXV. consisting of extracts from the existing manuscripts, and a republication of the volume printed at Edinburgh in the year 1740. Aberdeen: Printed for the Spalding club.
- Campbell, Alexander D. (2017). The Life and Works of Robert Baillie (1602–1662): Politics, Religion and Record-Keeping in the British Civil Wars. Woodbridge: Boydell & Brewer. Archived from the original on 20 July 2019. ISBN 978-1-78327-184-9
- Carlyle, Thomas (1839–1869). "Baillie The Covenanter (1841)". Critical and miscellaneous essays. [electronic resource]. Vol. 4. New York: John W. Lovell Company. pp. 168–204.
- Chambers, Robert; Thomson, Thomas Napier (1857). "Baillie, Robert" . A Biographical Dictionary of Eminent Scotsmen . Vol. 1. Glasgow: Blackie and Son. pp. 86–88 – via Wikisource. This article incorporates text from this source, which is in the public domain.
- Chisholm, Hugh, ed. (1911). "Baillie, Robert". Encyclopædia Britannica. Vol. 3 (11th ed.). Cambridge University Press. p. 220. This article incorporates text from this source, which is in the public domain.
- Cousin, John William (1910), "Baillie, Robert", A Short Biographical Dictionary of English Literature, London: J. M. Dent & Sons – via Wikisource
- Grosart, Alexander Balloch (1885–1900). "Baillie, Robert (1599–1662)". Dictionary of National Biography. London: Smith, Elder & Co. This article incorporates text from this source, which is in the public domain.
- Howie, John; Carslaw, W. H. (1870). "Robert Baillie". The Scots worthies. Edinburgh: Oliphant, Anderson, & Ferrier. pp. 280–288. This article incorporates text from this source, which is in the public domain.
- Johnston, Archibald, Lord Warriston; Paul, George Morison (1896). Fragment of the Diary of Sir Archibald Johnston, Lord Wariston. (May 21 – June 25 1639), The preservation of the honours of Scotland, 1651–52, Lord Mar's Legacies, 1722–27, Letters concerning Highland affairs in the 18th century. Vol. 26. Edinburgh: Printed at the University Press by T. and A. Constable for the Scottish History Society.
- Johnston, Archibald, Lord Warriston; Paul, George Morison (1911). Diary of Sir Archibald Johnston of Wariston (Volume 1: 1632–1639). 1. Vol. 61. Edinburgh: Printed at the University Press by T. and A. Constable for the Scottish History Society.
- Johnston, Archibald, Lord Warriston; Fleming, David Hay (1919). Diary of Sir Archibald Johnston of Wariston (Volume 2: 1650–1654). 2. Vol. 18. Edinburgh: Printed at the University Press by T. and A. Constable for the Scottish History Society. This article incorporates text from this source, which is in the public domain.
- Johnston, Archibald, Lord Warriston; Ogilvie, James D. (1940). Diary of Sir Archibald Johnston of Wariston (Volume 3: 1655–1660). 3. Vol. 34. Edinburgh: Printed at the University Press by T. and A. Constable for the Scottish History Society. Archived from the original on 6 July 2020.
- Kirkton, James (1817). The secret and true history of the church of Scotland from the Restoration to the year 1678. Edinburgh: J. Ballantyne.
- Macpherson, John; McCrie, C. G. (1903). Doctrine of the church in Scottish theology : the sixth series of the Chalmers Lectures. Edinburgh: Macniven & Wallace. p. 34-225.
- Mitchell, Alexander Ferrier (1897). The Westminster assembly : its history and standards, being the Baird lecture for 1882 (2 ed.). Philadelphia: Presbyterian Board of Publication.
- Reid, Henry Martin Beckwith (1917). The divinity principals in the University of Glasgow. Glasgow: J. Maclehose. pp. 1–82.
- Reid, Henry Martin Beckwith (1923). The divinity professors in the University of Glasgow, 1640-1903. Glasgow: Maclehose, Jackson and Co. pp. 75–126. This article incorporates text from this source, which is in the public domain.
- Reid, James (1815). Memoirs of the lives and writings of those eminent divines who convened in the famous Assembly at Westminster, in the seventeenth century. Vol. 2. Paisley: Printed by Stephen and Andrew Young. pp. 270–278.
- Scott, Hew (1928). Fasti ecclesiae scoticanae; the succession of ministers in the Church of Scotland from the reformation. Vol. 7. Edinburgh: Oliver and Boyd. pp. 395–396. This article incorporates text from this source, which is in the public domain.
- Smith, Thomas (1827). Select memoirs of the lives, labours, and sufferings of those pious and learned English and Scottish divines : who greatly distinguished themselves in promoting the Reformation from popery, in translating the Bible, and in promulgating its salutary doctrines by their numerous evangelical writings, and who ultimately crowned the venerable edifice with the celebrated Westminster Confession of Faith. Glasgow: D. Mackenzie. pp. 623–629.
- Stevenson, David. "Baillie, Robert". Oxford Dictionary of National Biography (online ed.). Oxford University Press. doi:10.1093/ref:odnb/1067. (Subscription, Wikipedia Library access or UK public library membership required.)

Academic offices
Preceded by Patrick Gillespie	Principal of the University of Glasgow; 1660–1662	Succeeded by Edward Wright (principal)
