= Robert Traill =

Robert Traill or Trail may refer to:

- Robert Traill of Greyfriars (1603–1678), minister of Greyfriars, Edinburgh and refugee in Holland
- Robert Traill (Scottish minister) (1642–1716), minister in Kent, author and prisoner on the Bass Rock
- Robert Traill (Irish clergyman) (1793–1847), Church of Ireland clergyman
- Robert Henry Traill or Roy Traill (1892–1989), New Zealand wildlife ranger
- Robert Trail (moderator) (1720–1775), Scottish minister

== See also ==
- Robert Traill Spence Lowell (1816–1891), American clergyman
- Robert Traill Spence Lowell IV (1917–1977), American poet
