= Robert Douglas (minister) =

Minister of the Church of Scotland (1594–1674)

The Reverend Robert Douglas

Personal details
- Born: 1593
- Died: 1674 (aged 80–81) Pencaitland
- Denomination: Presbyterian

Robert Douglas (1594–1674) was the only minister of the Church of Scotland to be Moderator of the General Assembly five times.

He was a Scottish preacher who supported the Presbyterian system of Christianity, rather than the episcopal church of the King of England; his preaching as a Covenantor led to his arrest and the loss of his post at Greyfriars Church in Edinburgh.

== Life ==
He was son of George Douglas, governor of Laurence, Lord Oliphant; the father was said to be an illegitimate son of Sir George Douglas of Lochleven, brother of Sir William Douglas, 6th Earl of Morton. Sir George helped Mary Queen of Scots to escape from Lochleven in 1567, and at the end of the seventeenth century the Scottish historians stated that Queen Mary was the mother of Sir George's illegitimate son. Gilbert Burnet states, in the manuscript copy of his 'History of his own Time' in the British Museum, that the rumour that Robert Douglas was Queen Mary's grandson was very common in his day, and that Douglas 'was not ill-pleased to have this story pass.' Wodrow (Analecta, iv. 226) repeats the tale on the authority of 'Old Mr. Patrick Simson,' and suggests that it was familiar to most Scotchmen. But the report may be a Whig fiction fabricated about Queen Mary to discredit the Jacobites of the seventeenth and eighteenth centuries. He was educated at the University of St Andrews, where he took the degree of M.A. in 1614.

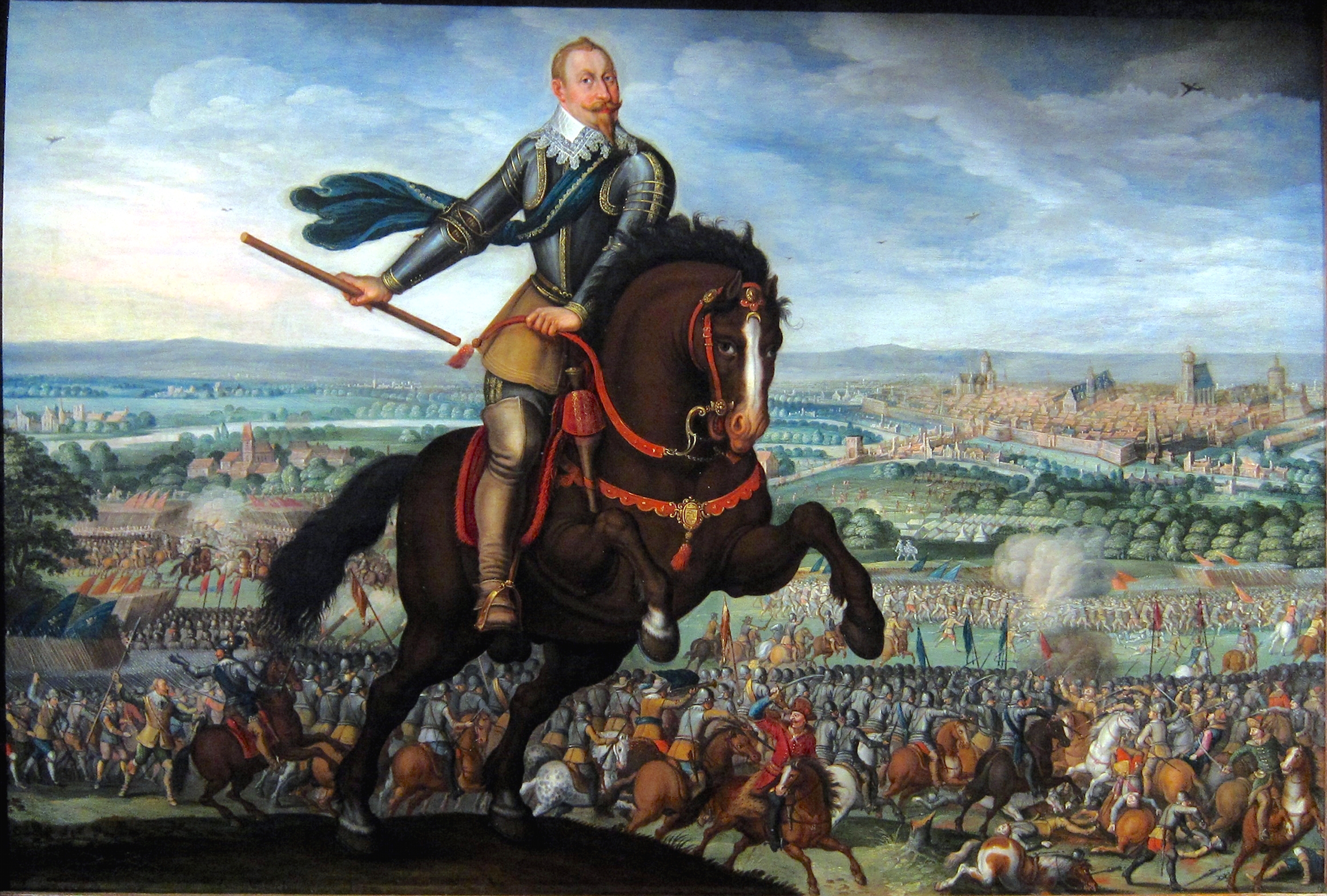
The victory of Gustavus Adolphus at the Battle of Breitenfeld (1631)

He became minister of Kirkcaldy in 1628, and a year later was offered a charge at South Leith, which he declined. He became chaplain to one of the brigades of Scottish auxiliaries sent with the connivance of Charles I to the aid of Gustavus Adolphus in the Thirty Years' War. Gustavus landed in Germany in June 1630; Robert Wodrow, in his 'Analecta,' gives several anecdotes, showing how he appreciated Douglas's advice. Returning to Scotland, he was elected in 1638 member of the General Assembly, and in the following year was chosen for the second charge of the High Church in Edinburgh. In 1641 he was removed to the Tolbooth Church, and in July of the same year preached a sermon before the Scottish parliament; at the end of 1641 he became the first minister of the Tolbooth Church.

In 1642 he was chosen moderator of the general assembly - a post he also held in 1645, 1647, 1649, and 1651 - and in 1643 he was named one of the commissioners of the Westminster Assembly.

In 1644 he was chaplain to one of the Scottish regiments in England, an account of which he gives in his 'Diary'. In 1649 he was retransferred to the High Church in Edinburgh (St Giles), and with other commissioners presented the Solemn League and Covenant to the parliament, and was appointed a commissioner for visiting the universities of Edinburgh, Aberdeen, and St Andrews. He became rector of King James’ College in 1649. In the following year he was one of the ministers who waited on Charles II at Dunfermline to obtain his signature to a declaration of religion; but as this document reflected on his father, Charles refused to sign it. The result was a division in the Scotch church on the matter, Douglas being a leader of the resolutioners, the party which preferred to treat the king leniently.

The Church of Scotland was now unhappily split into two contending sections. Old friends who had fought side by side in earlier days became opponents, and there was much bitterness and occasionally misrepresentations, due in some cases to misunderstandings, exaggerated reports or false rumours. Of the Resolutioners, Robert Douglas was, by head and shoulders, the acknowledged leader. His ministerial supporters included David Dickson, Robert Baillie, and James Wood. Among the Protesters the most outstanding ministers were James Guthrie, Samuel Rutherfurd, Andrew Cant, Patrick Gillespie, and John Livingstone; and, of the elders, Wariston and Sir John Cheisly; the two most strenuous fighters being Guthrie and Wariston.

In January 1651 Douglas officiated at the coronation of Charles II at Scone, preaching a sermon in which he said that it was the king's duty to maintain the established religion of Scotland, and to bring the other religions of the kingdom into conformity with it. Douglas was sent prisoner to London by Oliver Cromwell, when he suppressed the Scotch royalists, but was released in 1653.

In 1654 he was called to London with other eminent ministers to consult with the Protector on the affairs of the Church of Scotland. Douglas was now the acknowledged leader of the moderate presbyterians or 'public resolutioners,' and retained the position till the Stuart Restoration, which he largely helped to bring about. In 1659 he joined with the other resolutioners in sending James Sharp to London to attend to the interests of the Scottish church, and Wodrow (Sufferings of the Church of Scotland) gives most of the correspondence which took place between them. In this year Douglas preached the sermon at the opening of Heriot's Hospital.

After the Restoration Douglas was offered the bishopric of Edinburgh if he would agree to the introduction of episcopacy into Scotland, but declined the office, and remonstrated with Sharp for accepting the archbishopric of St. Andrews. He preached before the Scottish Parliament in Edinburgh in 1661, and 27 June 1662 was given the pastorate of Greyfriars Kirk. Four months later, he was deprived of this post and told to leave; the reason given was for his ‘declining to recognise episcopacy'.

In 1669 the privy council licensed him as an indulged minister to the parish of Pencaitland in East Lothian. He died in 1674, aged 80.

== Family ==
He married (1) Margaret Kirkaldie, and (2) Margaret Boyd on 20 August 1646. By the former he was father of Thomas, Janet, Alexander, minister of Logie Kirk, Elizabeth, Archibald, and Robert. He had also two children (Robert and Margaret) by his second wife.

He married (1) Margaret Kirkaldy, and had issue — James, of Earnslaw (Fife Sets., xii., 289); Thomas, who died before 1667, when Alexander is called second son (G. R. Inhib., 12 March 1680); Janet; Alexander, minister of Logie; Patrick, bapt. 28th Jan. 1642 (marr. Margaret Lothian), died before 1673 (G. R. Inhib., 26th Jan. 1674): Elizabeth, bapt. 3rd Jan. 1643; Archibald, bapt. 8th Jan. 1644; Robert: (2) 20th Aug. 1646, Margaret Boyd, who survived him, and was buried 13 July 1692, and had issue — Robert; Margaret, bapt. 18 July 1658.

== Works ==
Hew Scott's list:

- 'The Diary of Mr. Robert Douglas when with the Scottish Army in England,' 1644.
- 'A Sermon preached at Scone, January the first, 1651, at the Coronation of Charles II,' 1651. The text is given in Kerr. An audio recording of this sermon is on YouTube.
- 'Master Douglas, his Sermon preached at the Down-sitting of the last Parliament of Scotland,' 1661.

Douglas was also involved with David Dickson’s work on publishing new Bible commenteries.
