= James Guthrie (minister) =

Minister of the Church of Scotland

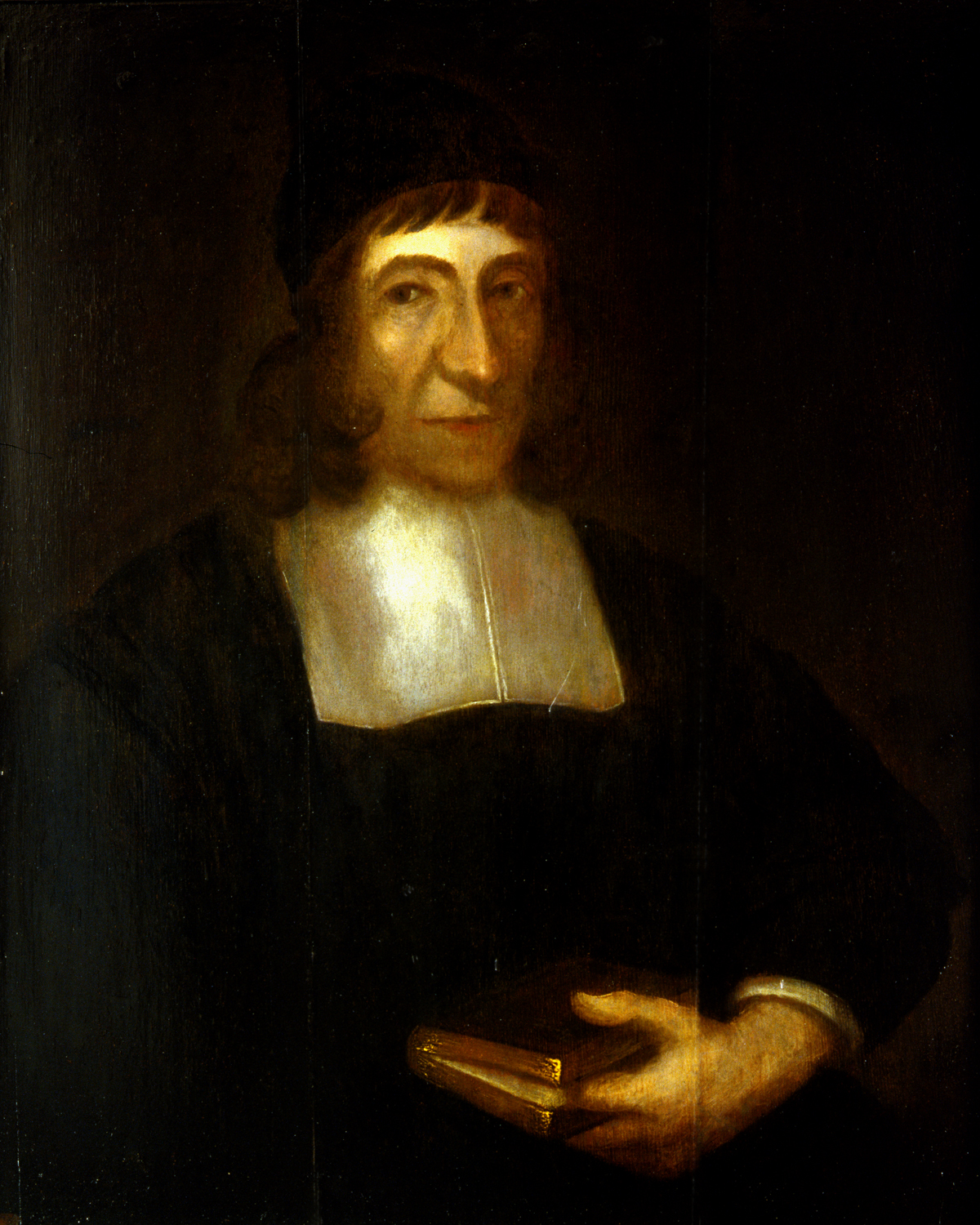
- James Guthrie (unknown artist) The Stirling Smith Art Gallery & Museum
- Church: Lauder, Stirling (Church of the Holy Rude)
- Predecessor: Henry Guthrie
- Successor: Henry Guthrie

Orders
- Ordination: Lauder (1642)

Personal details
- Died: 1661 Grassmarket, Edinburgh
- Denomination: Christian
- Spouse: Jane (imprisoned in Shetland)
- Children: two: William, Sophia
- Education: University of St Andrews

James Guthrie (c. 1612 – 1 June 1661), was a Scottish Presbyterian minister and martyr. A supporter of the Scottish Reformation, he refused to follow the episcopal church of the king of England, and preached as a Covenanter; he was executed for treason in Edinburgh.

== Early life and education ==
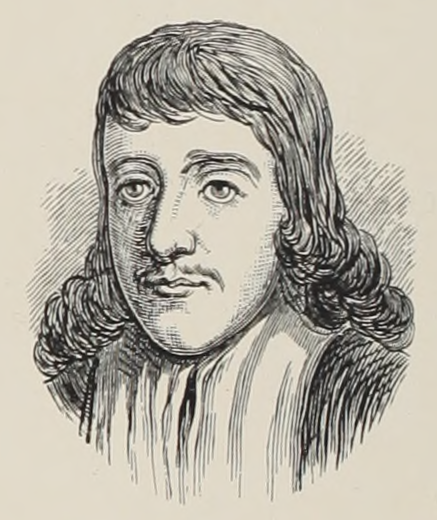
James Guthrie from the Carslaw's easy-to-read book which has an account of his life and an appendix on his trial

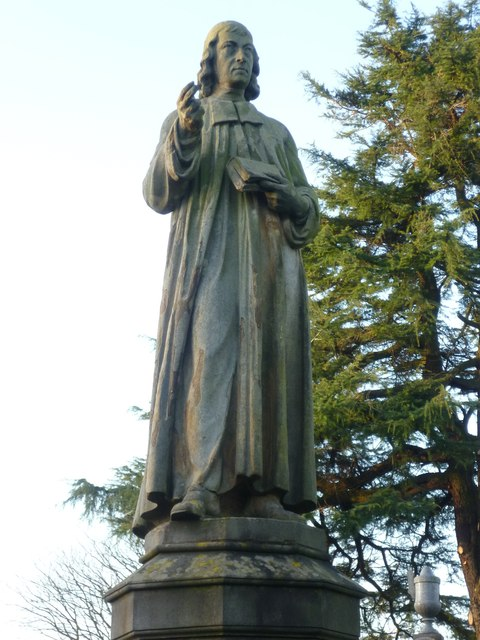
James Guthrie statue by Alexander Handyside Ritchie, Valley Cemetery, Stirling 1857

Guthrie, the eldest son of the laird of Guthrie, Forfarshire, was born about 1612. He was educated at St. Leonard's College, St. Andrews, where he graduated with an MA, and became one of the regents, distinguished for his lectures on philosophy.

At this time Guthrie was an episcopalian, and is said to have been zealous for prelacy and the ceremonies. Yet on 16 December 1638 the strongly antiprelatic assembly at Glasgow put him in the list of those ready for ecclesiastical vacancies. In January 1639 Samuel Rutherford was made divinity professor at the University of St Andrews, and under his influence Guthrie became a Presbyterian.

== First charge at Lauder ==
In 1642 he was ordained minister of Lauder, Berwickshire. He soon distinguished himself in the cause of the National Covenant. He was a member of the General Assembly from 1644 to 1651; in the first year he received (15 May) £15 towards the expenses of his attendance from the Kirk session of Stow, Midlothian. In 1646 he was one of seven commissioners appointed by the Committee of Estates to wait on Charles I at Newcastle-on-Tyne with a letter from the general assembly whose purport was, according to Kilpatrick, to press on Charles Presbyterianism and the Solemn League and Covenant. He preached before the Scottish Parliament on 10 January 1649. He also preached on 16 January before the parliamentary commission for the visitation of the University of St. Andrews. Next month a movement was made for his removal to Edinburgh. He preached on 13 July before the parliamentary commission for the visitation of the University of Edinburgh. In November he was translated to the Church of the Holy Rude in Stirling where he remained for ten years.

== Political background ==
=== Engagers versus Remonstrants ===
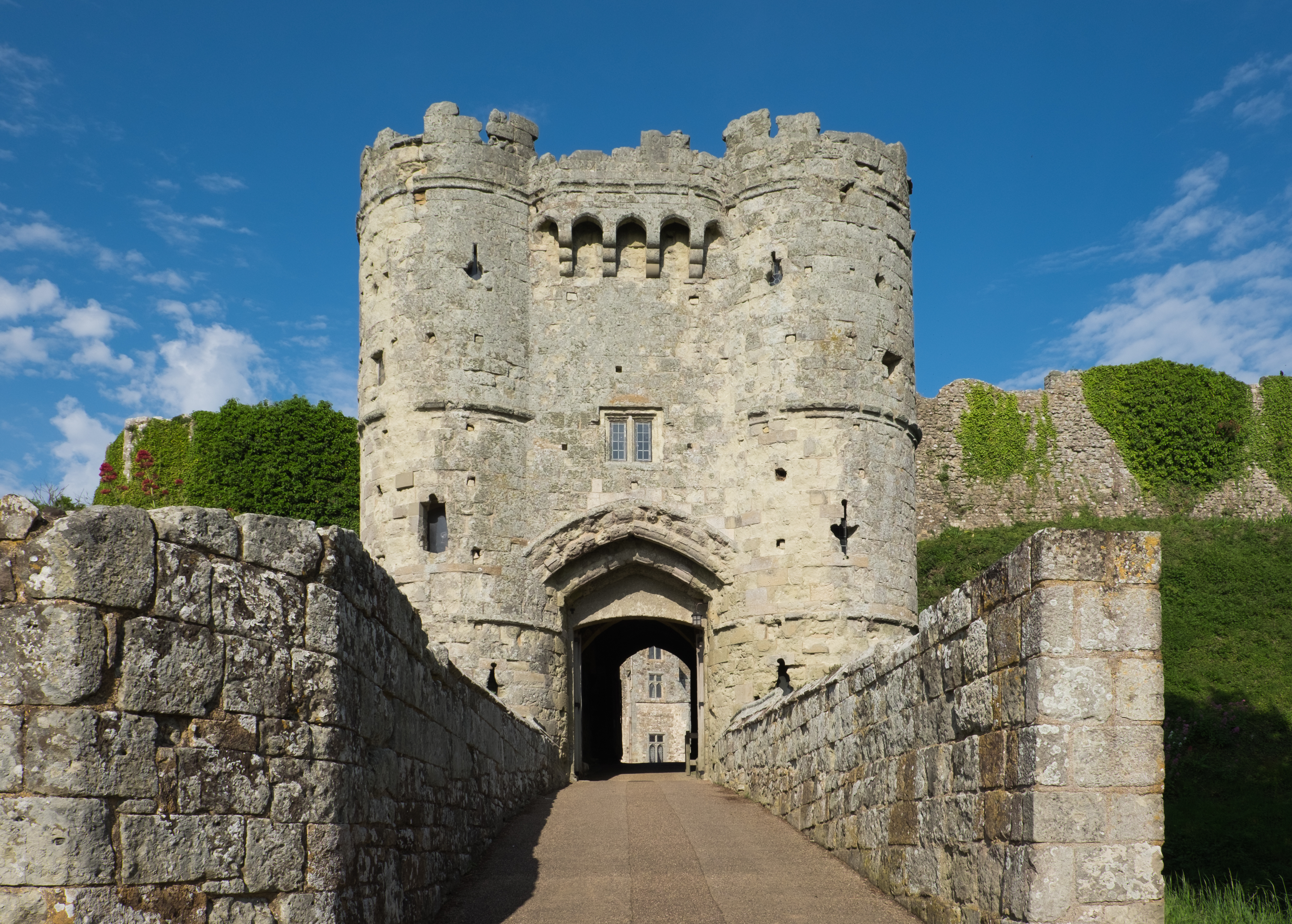
Carisbrooke Castle, where a secret agreement, or "Engagement", was signed to back Charles I with an army in return for implementing the Solemn League and Covenant albeit in a weakened, some would say a compromised, form.

The origin of the dispute goes back to the year 1647, when, after difficult and intricate negotiations, Charles was delivered up to the English Parliament, and after an attempt to escape from Hampton Court was taken and committed as a prisoner to Carisbrooke Castle on the Isle of Wight. While there, a secret treaty was framed between him and representatives from Scotland, in which he agreed under certain conditions to accept the Solemn League and Covenant, and to establish Presbyterianism for three years in England. This treaty, known as the "Engagement," though approved by the Scottish Parliament, was rejected and condemned by the Commission of Assembly of the Church of Scotland, which instructed every minister to preach against it, and to use his utmost influence to prevent the Marquis of Hamilton's expedition for the relief of the King from proving successful. The defeat of his army at Preston, while it extinguished the hopes of his party, widened the breach which had now been made in the once united ranks of the Covenanters. Two parties were formed, which regarded one another with unconcealed hostility: the Engagers, so called from the Engagement which Hamilton had made with the King; and the Remonstrants or strict Covenanters who were under the leadership of Warriston and Argyll. James Guthrie wanted the full force of the Covenants in national life in all parts of the kingdoms and opposed the Engagement and supporting the army which backed it; he became a Remonstrator.

Guthrie was one of three Scottish church commissioners who had an interview with Cromwell in Edinburgh following his defeat of the Engagers’ invasion of England in 1648. Cromwell assured the commissioners that he was "for monarchical government, and that in the person of the king and his posterity". Cromwell called Guthrie "the short man who would not bow."

=== Resolutioners versus Protestors ===
This breach was still further widened by an Act of the Scottish Parliament, known as the Act of Classes, which was passed on 23 January 1649, a week before Charles was beheaded. According to the act, the various ranks of Malignants or Engagers were declared incapable of holding any office of public trust or employment, whether in Church or in State. The first result of this Act was to throw the management of public affairs into the hands of those who were afterwards defeated by Cromwell at Dunbar in September 1650. Following Dunbar there was some soul-searching to determine what had gone wrong. This led to the Western Remonstrance which was read before the government on 22 October 1650 at Stirling. The Remonstrance was also considered by the Commission of Assembly starting on 25 November 1650. Essentially God was considered to have withdrawn his favour due to Achan-like sin at a personal and a national level. They did not shy away from listing even the king's sins. The proposed remedy was repentance and purification.

Others took a different view and blamed the defeat at Dunbar on the purging of some 5000 able men from the army and therefore wanted the conditions for entry into the army relaxed. On 14 December 1650, the Commission of the General Assembly of the Church of Scotland at Perth replied to a question from the government as to who would be allowed to fight in the army. Following this reply the Parliament on 23 December 1650 passed its "Act of Levy" which in a contra-Gideon-like manner, expanded the list of those who would be allowed to fight.

By and by, when the Engagers returned to power, the Act of Classes was repealed, and a new army was levied which, to a large extent, was officered and filled by men who were regarded as unfaithful to the Covenant. In favour of this proceeding, however, the Church, forsaking the higher sphere, issued certain Resolutions, which were strenuously protested against by a large and influential minority. Such was the origin of the controversy between the Resolutioners and Protesters, which raged with unabated animosity for many years.

Those in favour of the loosening of the conditions for fighting were known as Resolutioners, a name derived from their approval of the resolutions of Commission and Parliament for the levy of 23 December.

The Church of Scotland was now unhappily split into two contending sections. Old friends who had fought side by side in earlier days became opponents, and there was much bitterness and occasionally misrepresentations, due in some cases to misunderstandings, exaggerated reports or false rumours. Of the Resolutioners, Robert Douglas was, by head and shoulders, the acknowledged leader. His ministerial supporters included David Dickson, Robert Baillie, and James Wood. Among the Protesters the most outstanding ministers were James Guthrie, Samuel Rutherfurd, Andrew Cant, Patrick Gillespie, and John Livingstone; and, of the elders, Wariston and Sir John Cheisly; the two most strenuous fighters being Guthrie and Wariston. Samuel Rutherford is known to have stayed with Guthrie in Stirling.

== Guthrie's political and theological views ==
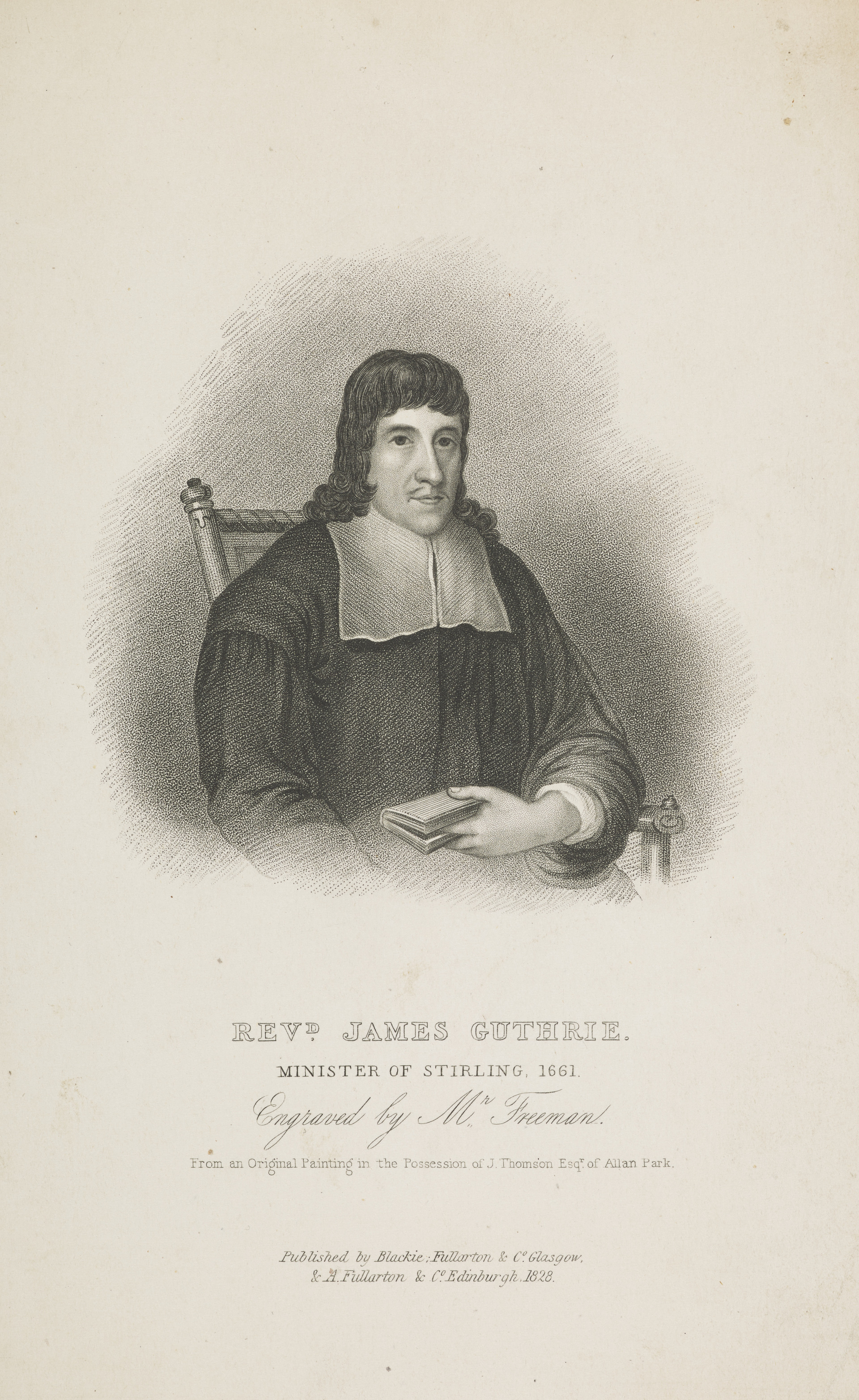
James Guthrie (Covenanter)

Guthrie was theologically and politically aligned with Archibald Johnston, whose 3-volume diaries were lost until 1896, and not fully published until 1940.

From the first, Guthrie ranged himself amongst the Protesters, and, indeed, was generally regarded as one of their principal leaders. By this time he had been translated to Stirling, where he had, as his colleague, Mr. Bennett, a man of kindred spirit, with whom, on the questions of the day, he was generally in agreement. Hew Scott's later edition says Guthrie came to Stirling around November 1650 although Kilpatrick discusses 1649. Not satisfied with expressing in a letter to the Commission of Assembly their dissatisfaction with the aforesaid Resolutions, they continued to preach against them and to denounce them as involving the nation in sin. For this they were cited to appear before the Committee of Estates at Perth, where Charles II was now holding his Court, and, having done so, they refused to acknowledge the King's right to interfere with them in the discharge of their ministerial functions.

"This our protestation' they said, "we make, not from any disrespect to the King's Majesty or your Lordships' authority, nor from any purpose to decline or disobey the same in anything civil, but from the tender regard which we have and owe unto the liberties and privileges of the Church of Jesus Christ, which both the King's Majesty and your Lordships and we are in so solemn a way bound to maintain and preserve inviolable."

In 1650 Guthrie treated General John Middleton with a high-handedness which sealed his own fate. Middleton, who joined Charles II immediately on his landing on 23 June, took the lead in a project for a royalist army in the north. On 17 October Guthrie, by the "Western Remonstrance", withdrew from the royalist cause; on 14 December he sent a letter to the general assembly at Perth denouncing Middleton as an enemy of the Covenant, and proposing his excommunication. Guthrie was appointed to pronounce the sentence next Sunday, and, despite a letter from the assembly bidding him delay the act, carried out the original order. At the next meeting of the commission (2 January 1651) Middleton was loosed from the sentence after public penance. He never forgave the affront.

The same meeting of commission which ordered Middleton's excommunication had passed a unanimous resolution authorising the acceptance of the military services of all but "obstinate" enemies of the covenant. Guthrie and his colleague, David Bennett, preached against this resolution. The two were required by His Majesty and the Committee of Estates to repair to Perth, 19 February 1651, to answer for preaching against the Public Resolutions agreed to by Church and State in order to a levy, but they refused. While acknowledging the king's civil authority, protested against his ecclesiastical jurisdiction, and declined to submit to what they called "a heighe prowoking the eiyes of the Lord's glorie". The attack on the resolution was led at the next meeting of the General Assembly at St. Andrews (16 July) by John Menzies, divinity professor in the Marischal College, Aberdeen, Guthrie strongly supported him. The assembly met by adjournment at Dundee (22 July), when a protestation against the action of the commission was read, those who had signed it absenting themselves, as from an unlawful assembly. The church was now divided into "resolutioners" and "protesters". Guthrie and two others were deposed by the assembly on 30 July; but for the alarm of Oliver Cromwell's approach, which dispersed the assembly, other "protesters" would have been similarly dealt with. A rupture took place in nearly every presbytery; the "protesters" met by themselves, and held their own synod in Edinburgh. They even turned for protection to Cromwell. On 8 August 1654 Guthrie was appointed by the English Privy Council one of the 'triers' and a visitor for the universities.

A conference between "resolutioners" and "protesters" at Edinburgh was rendered abortive by the attitude of Guthrie and Warriston. At a riot in Stirling on the election (1656) of a successor to Bennett, Guthrie was attacked with stones by "resolutioners". Kirk Session records from the time still survive. Both parties appealed to Cromwell in London in 1656. The champion of the "resolutioners" was James Sharp, afterwards archbishop, whose arguments led Cromwell to refuse the plea of the "protesters" for a commission in their favour. The cause of the "protesters" was further weakened by the defection of some of them (including Menzies) to independency, a development which increased Guthrie's opposition to Cromwell's government.

== After the Restoration ==
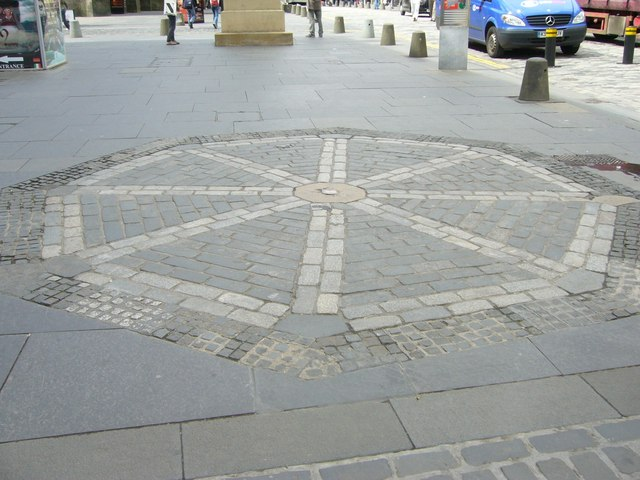
Guthrie's place of execution: Mercat Cross on Edinburgh's Royal Mile.

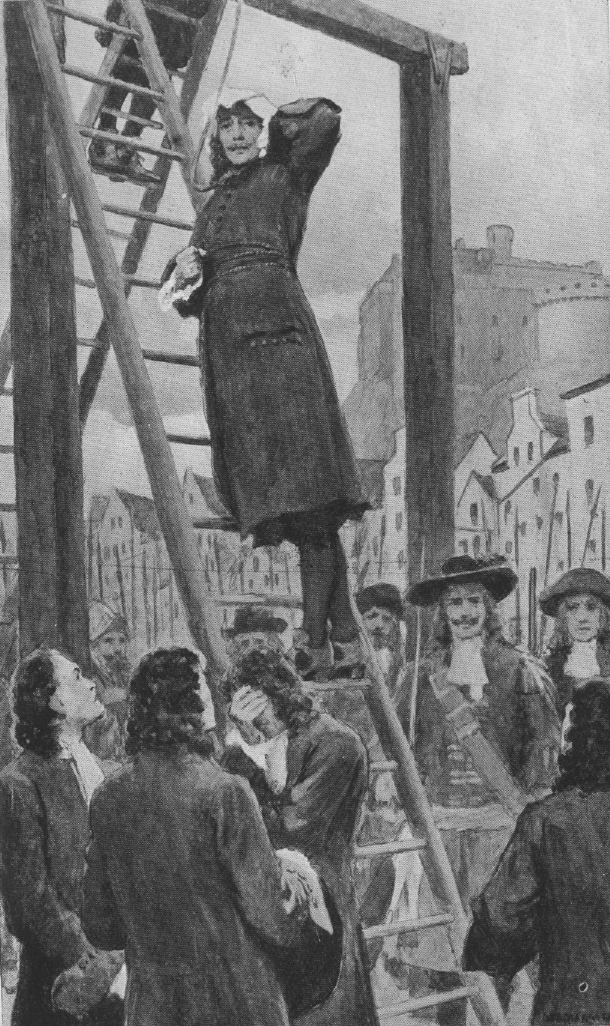
Execution of Rev James Guthrie next to Edinburgh's Mercat Cross (then located on the High Street); the second man, after the Duke of Argyll, to be executed for high treason after the Restoration of 1660.

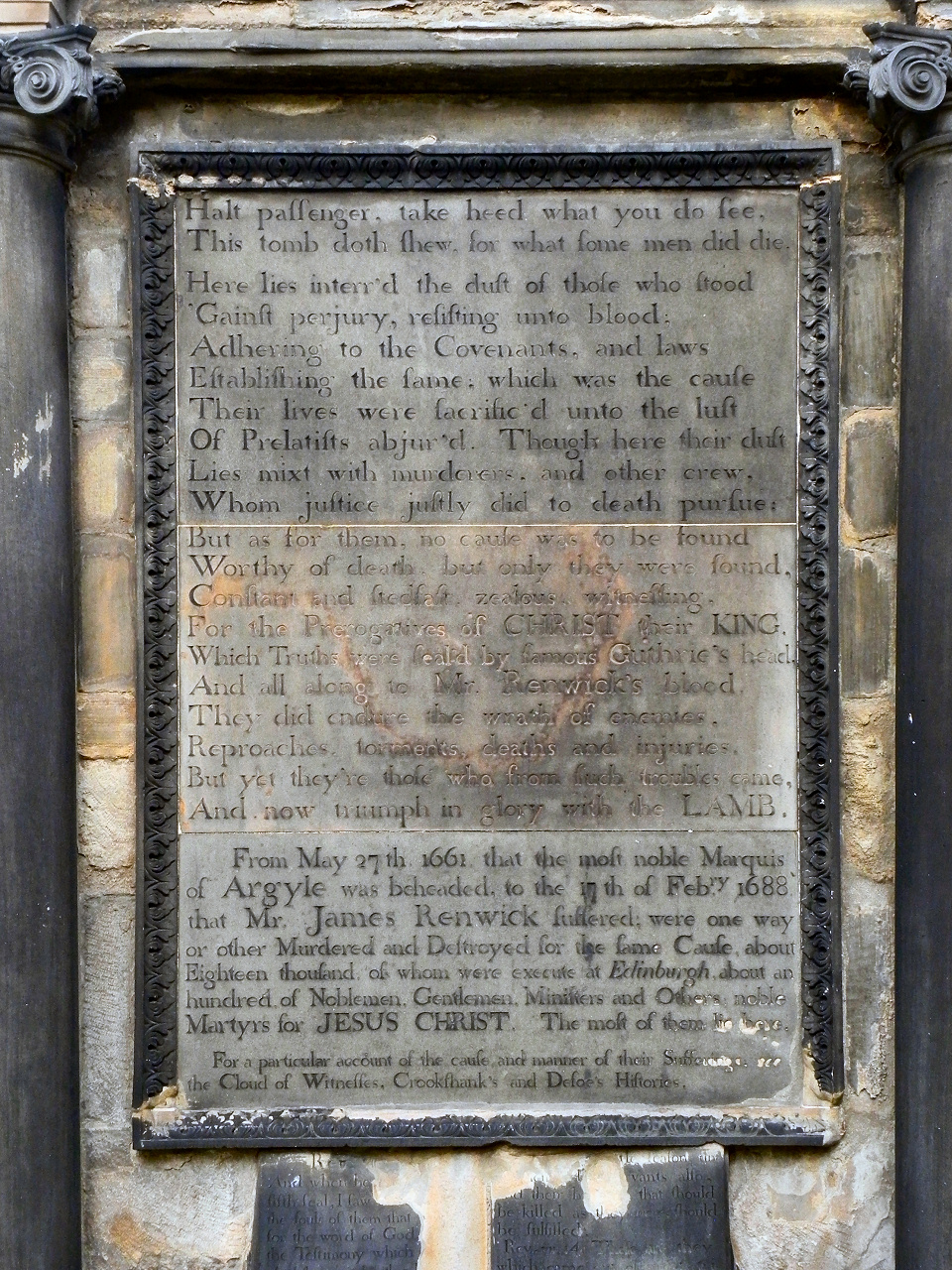
Martyrs' Monument (inscription). The central section mentions Guthrie's head which was put on public display at the Nether Bow port.

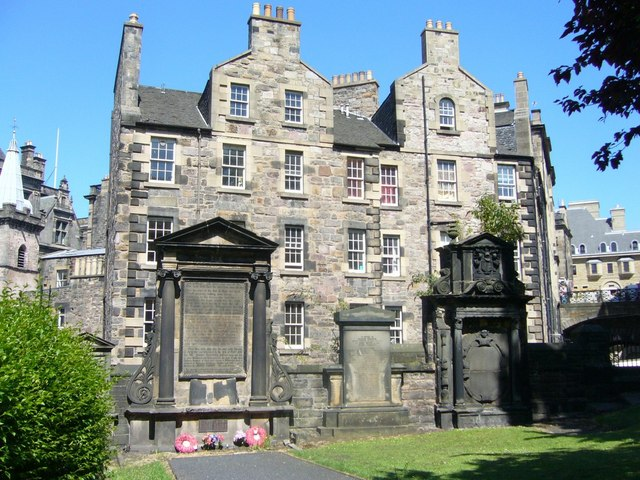
Martyrs' Monument, Greyfriars Kirkyard

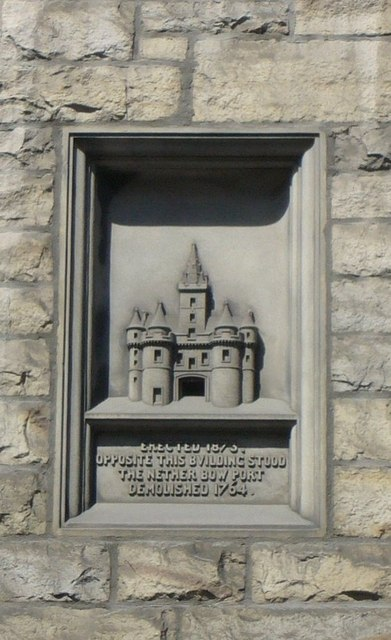
Site of the Netherbow Port on The Royal Mile where Guthrie's skull remained for 28 years.

The Restoration rendered the prospects of the "protesters" hopeless. Guthrie and nine others met in Edinburgh (23 August 1660) and drew up a "humble petition" to the king setting forth their loyalty, and reminding him of his obligations as a covenanter. The meeting was ordered to disperse, and as the warning was unheeded arrests were made. Guthrie was imprisoned in Edinburgh Castle and on 25 September his stipend was sequestrated. He was transferred to Dundee on 20 October, and thence to Stirling, where he remained till his trial. On 20 February 1661 he was arraigned for high treason before the parliament, Middleton presiding as commissioner. The indictment had six counts.

The charges against Guthrie were six in number: (1) His contriving, consenting to, and exhibiting before the Committee of Estates the paper called The Western Remonstrance. (2) His contriving, writing, and publishing the abominable pamphlet called "The Causes of God's wrath." (3) His contriving, writing and subscribing the paper called "The Humble Petition," of the 23 of August last, when he was apprehended. (4) His convocating of the King's lieges at several times, without warrant or authority, to the disturbance of the peace of the State and of the Church. (5) His refusal, by appeal and protest presented at Perth, to acknowledge the King as judge in certain matters. (6) Some treasonable expressions alleged to have been used by him in a meeting, in 1650 or 1651.

On 20 February 1661, his indictment being read, Guthrie delivered an excellent speech, which may be found in Wodrow's History. Expressing the hope that the Lord Commissioner Middleton, who was known to have a grudge against him) would "patiently and without interruption" hear him, he reminded his judges that the law of God, referred to in the indictment, is the supreme law, not only of religion, but also of righteousness, and that all laws and Acts of Parliament are to be understood and expounded in the light of our solemn vows and covenants.

The contriving of the "western remonstrance" and the rejection of the king's ecclesiastical authority were, from a legal point of view, the most formidable charges. In the preparation of his defence he surprised his counsel by the accuracy of his knowledge of Scots law. The trial was not concluded until 11 April. Guthrie's closing appeal made a strong impression. Several members withdrew; but only Tweeddale spoke in his favour, proposing banishment in place of the extreme penalty.

Guthrie was exempted from the general pardon at the restoration of the monarchy. On 28 May parliament ordered him to be hanged at the cross of Edinburgh on 1 June, in company with William Govan, an obscure deserter. Robert Traill, at the age of nineteen, stood beside Guthrie, his father's friend, on the scaffold.

Guthrie's farewell letter (1 June 1661) to his wife shows great strength of character. At eleven o'clock the same day he signed a paper to dispose of the rumour that he was willing to retract. At dinner he called for cheese, saying his physicians had forbidden it, but he was beyond the need of such precautions. He spoke at the scaffold for about an hour, leaving a copy of his speech to be given to his son when he came of age. He is also reported to have left his ring with his niece. Opportunities of escape, he said, he had rejected, as flight might be taken as an admission of guilt. At the last moment he "raised the napkin from his eyes", and lifted up his voice for the covenants. His head was fixed on the Nether Bow port.

The legend runs that, a few weeks later, drops of blood fell from it on to Middleton's coach, making a new cover necessary, as "all the art of man could not wash out" the indelible stains. In 1688 Alexander Hamilton, a divinity student (died 29 January 1738, minister of Stirling), removed the head and buried it. The headless trunk was laid out by "ladies of quality", who dipped their handkerchiefs in the blood, George Stirling pouring "a phial of fragrant ointment" on the corpse; it was interred in the aisle of St. Giles' Church.

== Family ==
Guthrie married Jane, daughter of Ramsay of Shielhill and they had two children - William (who died on the eve of his license for the ministry) and a daughter, Sophia. The widow and daughter werre brought before the privy council on 8 February 1666, on a charge of possessing a treasonable book (John Brown's Apologeticall Relation of the Particular Sufferings of the Faithful Ministers and Professors of the Church of Scotland), and sentenced to banishment in Shetland; on 15 January 1669, they were permitted to return to Edinburgh for a month, in consequence of the son's illness. Jane died in 1673.

== Legacy ==
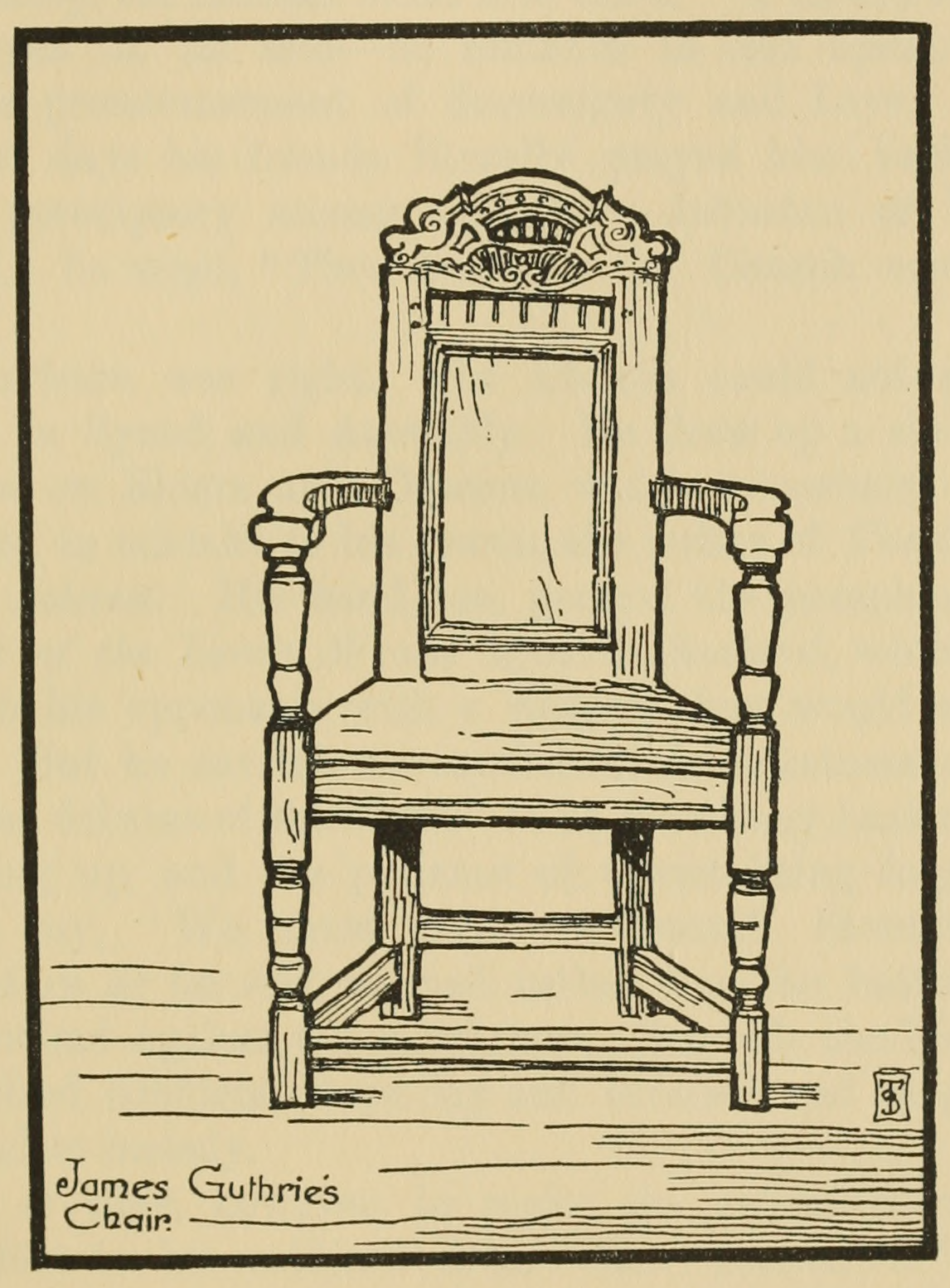
James Guthrie's chair. This along with his portrait and ring are kept at the Stirling Smith Art Gallery and Museum. Guthrie's ring also features in a modern painting called The Stirling Smith Girl.

Guthrie's age at death was "about 49". He is celebrated as one of the first of the martyrs of the covenant, James Renwick being one of the last. The two are thus commemorated in the inscription upon the 'martyrs' monument' in the Greyfriars' churchyard, Edinburgh, the Westminster Abbey of Scotland:

But as for them, no cause was to be found
Worthy of death but only they were found,
Constant and steadfast, zealous witnessing
For the Prerogatives of CHRIST their KING
Which Truths were seal'd by famous Guthrie's head,
And all along to Mr. Renwick's blood,
They did endure the wrath of enemies
Reproaches, torments, deaths and injuries
But yet they're those who from such troubles came
And now triumph in glory with the LAMB.

The monument marks Renwick's burial-place, being fixed to the wall close to the spot where criminals were interred.

The Scottish parliament reversed the attainder on 22 July 1690. His name ("famous Guthrie's head") is commemorated in the rude lines on the "martyrs' monument" in Greyfriars Churchyard, Edinburgh. By his party he was called "Sickerfoot" ("Sure-foot").

== Works ==
Guthrie published:

1. The Causes of the Lord's Wrath, 1653
2. Protesters no Subverters, Edinburgh, 1658, 4to.
3. Some Considerations contributing unto the Discoverie of the Dangers that threaten Religion, Edinburgh, 1660, 12mo; reprinted, Glasgow, 1738, 8vo.
4. Sermon (his last) at Stirling (Matt. xiv. 22), 1660 (not seen); reprinted as A Cry from the Dead, &c., Glasgow, 1738, 8vo.

Posthumous publications of his work:

1. Two Speeches … before the Parliament, 1661, 4to.
2. True and Perfect Speech … before his Execution, 1661, 4to.
3. A Treatise of Ruling Elders and Deacons, Edinburgh, 1699, 24mo.
4. A Cry from the Dead Glasgow, 1738
5. The Great Danger of Backsliding … from Covenanted Reformation-Principles: a Sermon dated 21 April 1660, with Guthrie's speech before Parliament, Edinburgh, 1739.
6. Sermons, Edinburgh, 1846, 12mo.
