= William Guthrie (minister) =

Scottish minister and author (1620–1665)

- the fool of Fenwick
- A portrait prefixed to some additions of "The Christian's Great Interest"

Personal details
- Born: 1620 Tanadice parish
- Died: 10 October 1665 (aged 44–45) Brechin
- Buried: Brechin Cathedral
- Parents: James Guthrie of Pitforthie, Forfarshire (father); daughter of Lyon of Easter-Ogle (mother)
- Education: University of St Andrews

William Guthrie (1620–1665) was a Scottish Covenanter minister and author. He was the first minister of Fenwick parish church in Ayrshire, Scotland. He is known primarily for his book on assurance, The Christian's Great Interest.

William Guthrie, born 1620, was the eldest son of James Guthrie of Pitforthie, Forfarshire, by a daughter of Lyon of Easter-Ogle, in Tanadice parish. He became an apt scholar, and on 5 June 1638 he graduated M.A. at the University of St Andrews, where his studies had been directed by his cousin, James Guthrie, then a regent in philosophy. He studied divinity under Samuel Rutherford. To free himself from what he considered purely worldly affairs, he made over Pitforthie to one of his brothers. He was licensed by the Presbtery of St Andrews in August 1642, and became tutor to the eldest son of John Campbell, first Earl of Loudoun, the Lord High Chancellor of Scotland. Some persons from Fenwick having heard him preach at a Fast-day service in Galston Kirk, they desired him to be called as the first minister of their newly created parish. That was done, and he was ordained 7 November 1644. Soon afterwards the General Assembly appointed him an army chaplain, and he was present at the engagement which took place at Mauchline Moor in June 1648. He also witnessed the covenanting defeat at Dunbar on 3 September 1650. He joined the Protesters in 1651. On 8 August 1654 he was appointed by the English Council on a committee for supervising admissions to the ministry within the bounds of his own Synod. Refusing to submit to Episcopacy, he was deprived 24 July 1664. He went to Pitforthie, which had again come into his hands through the death of his brother, and following a period of ill-health, he died in the manse of his brother-in-law, Laurence Skinner, minister of Brechin, 10 October 1665, and was buried in the Cathedral there.

== Character ==
Hew Scott says he was a man of ready wit, who moved freely amongst his people, lived simply, and spent a great part of his leisure in such sports as fishing and fowling. When he preached his church was crowded, and his pastoral work was performed with undiminished fervour and success throughout all his ministry. He refused calls to Renfrew, Linlithgow, Stirling, Glasgow, and Edinburgh. Dr John Owen describes him as "one of the greatest divines that ever wrote." Guthrie's book, The Christian s Great Interest (which has been translated into several foreign tongues), was published to vindicate himself against a volume purporting to contain a series of his sermons on Isaiah 55. This appeared at Aberdeen about 1657 as A Clear, Attractive, Warming Beam of Light. In 1680 another work professing to be his was issued, with the title The Heads of some Sermons preached at Finnick in August 1662, but this also was disclaimed by his widow in a public advertisement. Most of his papers were seized in 1682, when Mrs Guthrie's house was raided by a party of soldiers instigated by the bishops. Guthrie was a lifelong friend of Robert Traill.

== Life ==
William Guthrie, Scottish presbyterian divine, was born in 1620 at Pitforthy, Forfarshire, of which his father was laird, his mother being of the house of Easter Ogle, parish of Tannadice, Forfarshire. William was the eldest of eight children; his three brothers were in the ministry; Robert died soon after license; Alexander (d. 1661) was minister of Strickathrow, Forfarshire; John, the youngest (d. 1669), minister of Tarbolton, Ayrshire, was ejected at the Restoration. William was educated at St. Andrews under his cousin James Guthrie. Having graduated M.A. on 5 June 1638, he studied divinity under Samuel Rutherford. Before entering the ministry he assigned the estate of Pitforthy to one of his brothers. He was licensed by St. Andrews presbytery in August 1642, and became tutor to James, lord Mauchline, eldest son of John Campbell, first earl of Loudoun, then lord high chancellor of Scotland. A sermon at Galston, Ayrshire, gained him a unanimous call to Fenwick (or New Kilmarnock), Ayrshire. James, eighth? lord Boyd of Kilmarnock, patron of the parish, a strong loyalist, opposed the choice, but Guthrie was ordained at Fenwick by Irvine presbytery on 7 November 1644. His preaching crowded his church, and his pastoral visitation was assiduous and successful. His health required outdoor exercise, and he was a keen sportsman and angler. A ready wit and unconventional dress earned him the appellation of 'the fool [jester] of Fenwick,' which appears even on title-pages of his sermons. He mixed with his parishioners on easy terms. Finding that one of them went fowling on Sunday, and made half-a-crown by it, he offered him that sum to attend the kirk, of which the man ultimately became an elder.

The general assembly appointed him an army chaplain, and in this capacity he was present at the engagement with the royal army at Mauchline Moor in June 1648. On 8 March 1649 he declined a call to Renfrew, and later calls to Linlithgow, Stirling, Glasgow, and Edinburgh. He sat in the general assembly which met at Edinburgh on 7 July 1649. After 'Dunbar drove' (3 Sept. 1650) he returned to Fenwick. In 1651, when the church of Scotland was divided between 'resolutioners' and 'protesters', he adhered to the latter party, and was moderator of a synod which they held in Edinburgh. On 8 August 1654 he was appointed by the English privy council one of the 'triers' for the province of Glasgow and Ayr. At the Restoration he was prominent in his efforts for the maintenance of the presbyterian system, proposing at the synod of Glasgow and Ayr (2 April 1661) an address to parliament for protection of the liberties of the church. He was obliged to be satisfied with a declaration against 'prelatical' episcopacy, without allusion to the covenants. William Cunningham, ninth earl of Glencairn, to whom he had rendered some services and who was now chancellor, interposed on his behalf with Andrew Fairfoul, archbishop of Glasgow, and afterwards with Fairfoul's successor, Alexander Burnet, but to no purpose. 'It cannot be,' said Burnet, 'he is a ringleader and a keeper up of schism in my diocese.' On 24 July 1664 Burnet's commissioner declared the parish of Fenwick vacant, an act of questionable legality. Guthrie remained some time in the parish, but did not preach again. In the autumn of 1665 he returned to his paternal estate of Pitforthy, which had again come into his possession by his brother's death. He had been subject for years to attacks of kidney stone disease, and now suffered from ulceration of the kidneys. He died on 10 October 1665, in the house of his brother-in-law, Lewis Skinner, minister at Brechin, and was buried in Brechin Church.

== Family life ==
In August 1645 he married Agnes (who survived him), daughter of David Campbell of Skeldon House in the parish of Dalrymple, Ayrshire. He had two sons and four daughters, but left only two daughters: Agnes, married to Matthew Miller of Glenlee, Ayrshire, and Mary, married to Patrick Warner, minister of Irvine; her daughter, Margaret, married Robert Wodrow, the church historian.

== Works ==
‘The Christian's Great Interest,’ &c., 1658(?). This book, which is based on sermons from Isaiah lv., has passed through numerous editions (e.g. 4th edition, 1667, 8vo; Glasgow, 1755, 8vo; Edinburgh, 1797, 12mo), and has been translated into French, German, Dutch, Gaelic (1783, 12mo, and 1845, 12mo), and ‘into one of the eastern languages, at the charge of the honourable Robert Boyle.’ Its publication was occasioned by the issue of a surreptitious and imperfect copy of notes of the sermons, issued at Aberdeen, 1657, with the title ‘A Clear, Attractive, Warming Beam of Light,’ &c. In 1680, 4to, appeared ‘The Heads of some Sermons preached at Fenwick in August 1662, by Mr. William Guthrie;’ his widow, by public advertisement, disclaimed this publication as unauthentic. ‘A Collection of Lectures and Sermons, preached mostly in the time of the late persecution,’ &c., Glasgow, 1779, 8vo, contains seventeen sermons transcribed from Guthrie's manuscripts by the editor, J. H. (i.e. John Howie). This volume was reprinted as ‘Sermons delivered in Times of Persecution in Scotland,’ Edinburgh, 1880, 8vo, with biographical notices by the Rev. James Kerr, Greenock. Most of Guthrie's papers were carried off in 1682, when his widow's house was searched by a party of soldiery.
Hew Scott:

- The Christian's Great Interest (probably 1658; numerous editions)
- Two Sermons (Glasgow, 1701)
- A Collection of Lectures and Sermons preached mostly in the Time of the late Persecution, edited by J[ohn] H[owie] (Glasgow, 1779; reprinted as Sermons delivered in Times of Persecution [with biographical notices by James Kerr, minister of the Reformed Presbyterian Church, Greenock] (Edinburgh, 1880)
- Crumbs of Comfort: or Grace in its various Degrees, and yet Oneness in Kind (n.p., 1681).

== Bibliography ==
- Hew Scott's Fasti Eccles. Scoticanæ;
- Howie's Biographia Scoticana (1775), edition of 1862 (Scots Worthies), p. 429 sq.
- Chambers's Gazetteer of Scotland, 1832, i. 424
- Memoir and Original Letters, by Muir, 1854 (originally published 1827)
- Grub's Eccl. Hist. of Scotland, 1861, vol. iii.
- Anderson's Scottish Nation, 1872, ii. 313, 389 sq.
- Kerr's Sermons in Times of Persecution, 1880, p. 81 sq., 659 sq. (gives also sermon by John Guthrie)
- Irvine's Book of Scotsmen, 1881, p. 187.
- Wodrow's Anal., i., 47, 169, 243; iii., 69;
- A true and exact Copy of Letters of Horning, or formal Excommunication past by Mr William Guthrie (n.p., 1681)
- Inq. Ret. Gen., 5001
- Acts of Ass.
- Acts of ParL, vi., pt. 2, 138
- Muir's Memoir and Original Letters (1827)
- The Scots Worthies
- Carslaw's Guthrie of Fenwick (Paisley, 1900)
- Thomson's Martyr Graves of Scotland, 102
- Johnston's Treasury of the Scottish Covenant, 324
- Hewison's Covenanters, ii., 184
- Black's Brechin
- Dict. Nat. Biog.
