= Robert Traill of Greyfriars =

Minister of the Church of Scotland

Robert Traill
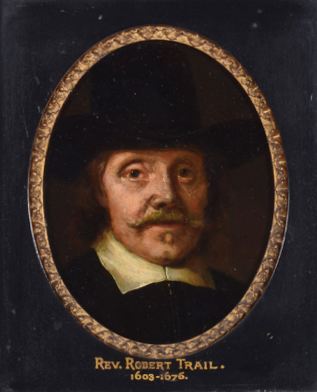

Personal details
- Born: Robert Traill; 1603
- Died: 1678 (aged 74–75)

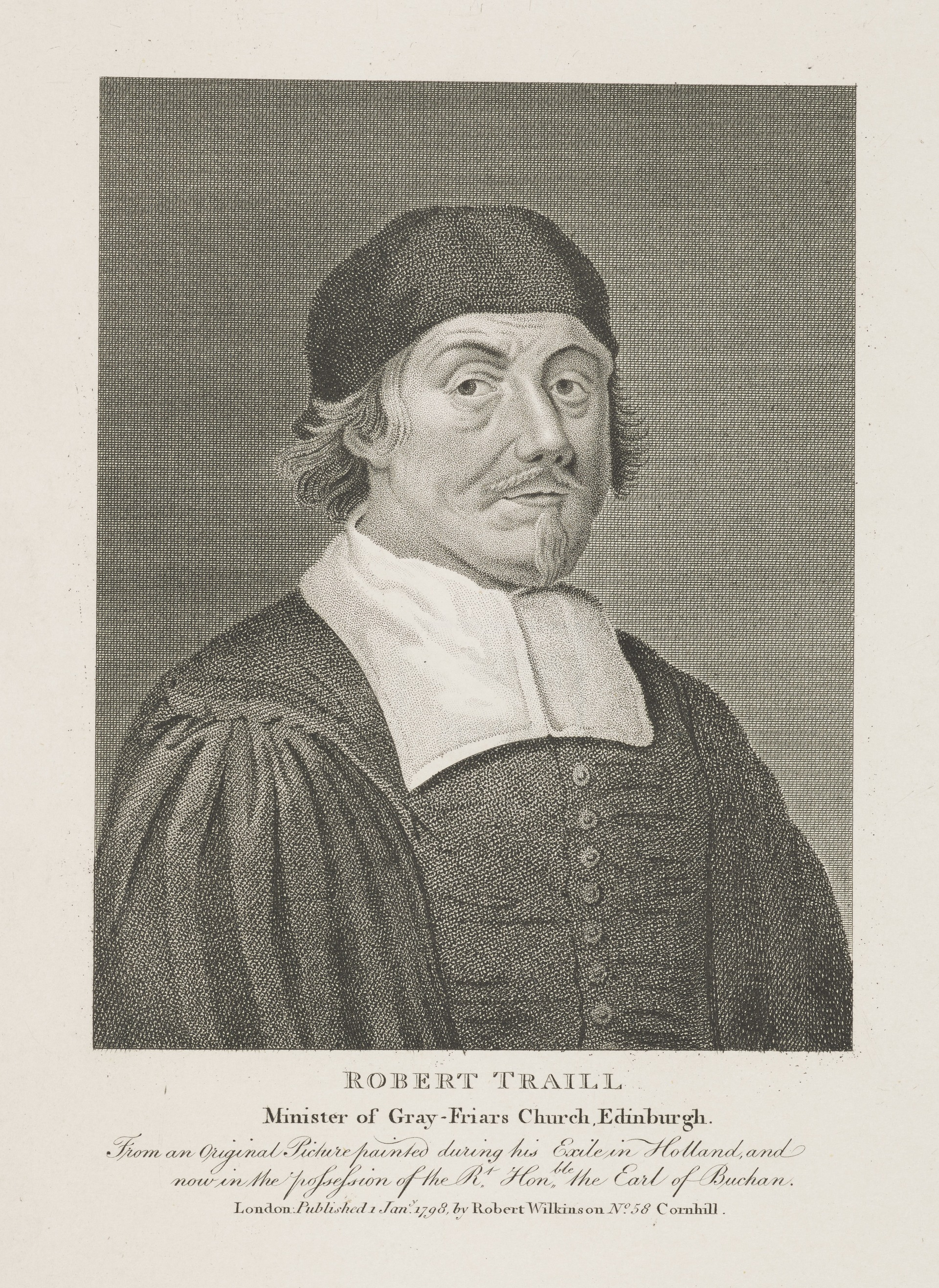
Robert Traill from an original painted during his exile in Holland

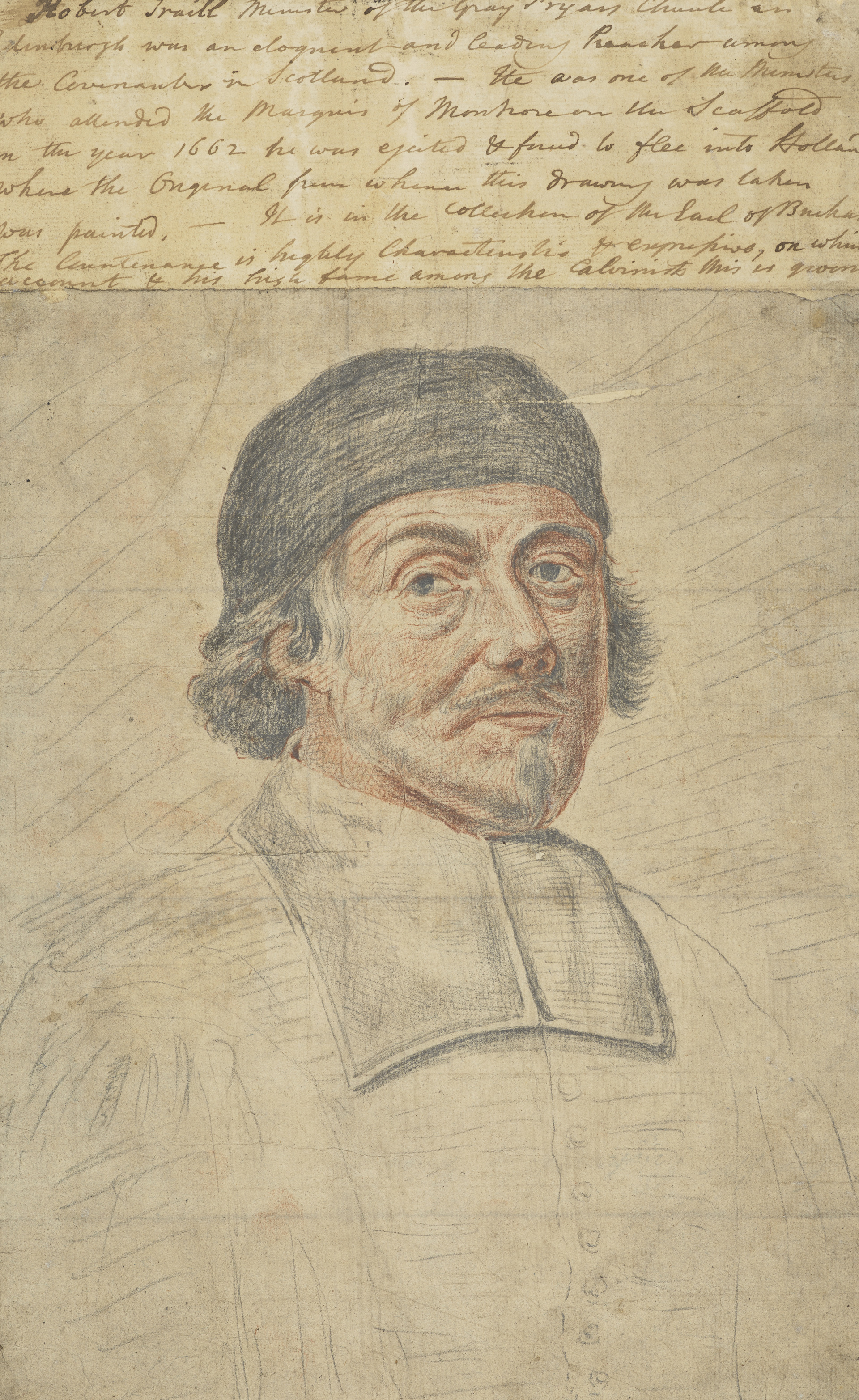
Rev. Robert Traill (1603-1678). A painting of him was, in 1857, placed in one of the windows of Greyfriars' church, Edinburgh.

Robert Traill of Greyfriars (1603 – 12 July 1678) was a Scottish Christian preacher. A supporter of the Scottish Reformation, he refused to follow the episcopal church of the king of England, and preached as a Covenanter; he was arrested for treason and barred from preaching in Scotland.

== Life in Scotland ==
Traill was born at Denino, in 1603. He was son of Colonel James Traill, of Killcleary, Ireland, Gentleman of the Privy Chamber to Henry, Prince of Wales, and grandson of the Laird of Blebo, and Matilda Melvill of Carnbee. He graduated with an M.A. from St Andrews on 21 July 1621. he went over to Paris, and subsequently joined his brother in Orleans. He later studied at the Protestant College of Saumur. He was an English tutor in France to the sister of the Duke of Rohan in 1628. He was afterwards teacher in a school established by a Protestant minister at Montague, in Bus Poitou. He became chaplain to Archibald, Marquess of Argyll (beheaded 1661). In 1630 he returned to Scotland.

He was ordained to Elie 17 July 1639. In 1640, he was ordered to attend Lord Lindsay's regiment at Newcastle for three months. He was chaplain to the Scots army at Marston Moor in 1644. He was elected by the Town Council 7 November 1648. He became minister at Old Greyfriars on 23 March 1649. In 1650 he attended the Marquess of Montrose on the scaffold. He was a protester rather than a resolutioner. He preached before Charles II at his coronation at Scone in 1651. In 1654 he was appointed by Cromwell one of those for certifying the ability and piety of such as were fit to be admitted to the ministry in the Lothian and Border provinces.

In August 1660, the royal Committee of Estates sat in Edinburgh; they decided to arrest ‘protesting ministers’ and Traill, John Murray, Alexander Moncrieff and James Guthrie were imprisoned in Edinburgh Castle. Guthrie was publicly hanged on 1 June 1661.

Traill was imprisoned for ten months, when, having fallen sick, he was temporarily permitted to return home. He was charged with high treason before the Privy Council, when he obliged himself, 11 December 1662, to remove from the kingdom within a month, under pain of death. John Livingstone was tried the same day.

== Move to Holland ==
Owing to tempestuous weather he experienced difficulty in finding a ship in which to sail to Holland, and the Privy Council granted him a month's further grace in which to take his departure. In a petition he states that he "is towards the age of sixty years, if not more, and so cannot weill take such a journey in such a season without evident hazard of his life" (Reg. P. C). He did make it to Holland along with other ministers and was later joined by his son Robert. For some years he carried on a weekly correspondence with his friend William Guthrie of Fenwick.

Returning to Edinburgh, he died 12 July 1678, and was buried in Greyfriars. A portrait of him is preserved in Smith's Iconographia Scot and Pinkerton's Scottish Gallery.

== Family life ==
He married 23 December 1639, Jean (died Dec. 1680), daughter of Alexander Annand of Auchterallan, Aberdeenshire, and then Margaret Cheyne (who suffered imprisonment, June 1665, for corresponding with her husband in his exile), and had 3 sons and 3 daughters:

- William, minister of Borthwick
- his second son also called Robert Traill, minister in London, and Bass Rock prisoner
- James, Lieutenant of Stirling Castle, baptised 10 March 1650, died 1721
- Helen (married Thomas Paterson, minister of Borthwick)
- Agnes, born 1646, died 1690 (married Sir James Steuart of Goodtrees, Lord Advocate of Scotland)
- Margaret, born 1648, died 1717 (married James Scott of Bristo, writer in Edinburgh)
