= Robert Traill (Scottish minister) =

Scottish Presbyterian minister

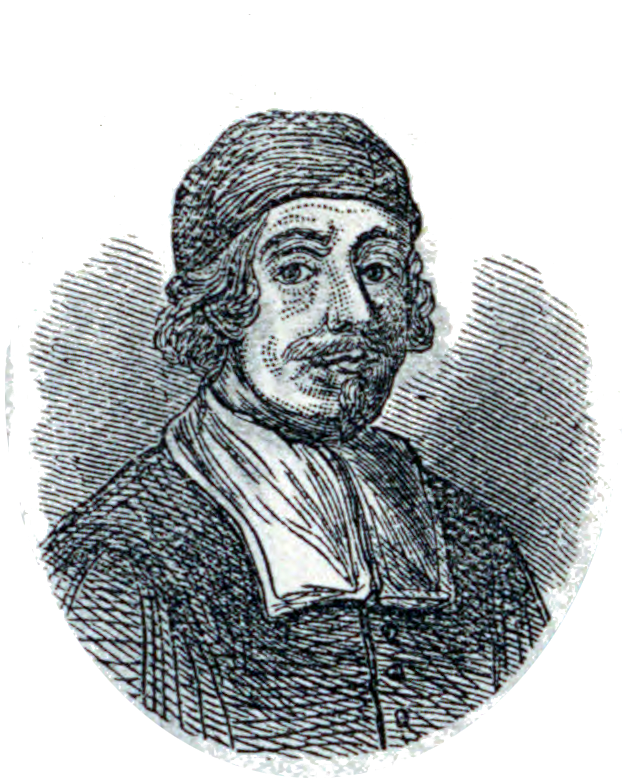
- Robert Traill. It's not clear whether this looks like Robert Traill of Greyfriars because it depicts him or because his son shared a family resemblance and had a similar taste in facial hair. See also the Gazetteer for Scotland page.

Personal details
- Born: Robert Traill; 1642 Elie, Fife
- Died: 16 May 1716 (aged 74)
- Education: University of Edinburgh

Robert Traill (1642 - 1716) was a Scottish minister who preached in England. A supporter of the Scottish Reformation, he refused to follow the episcopal church of the king of England, and preached as a Covenanter; he was arrested for treason and holding illegal outdoor church meetings. He was incarcerated on the Bass Rock, an island in the Firth of Forth from July 19, 1677, to October 5, 1677. His work was often quoted by J. C. Ryle and is still published in the 21st century.

== Life ==
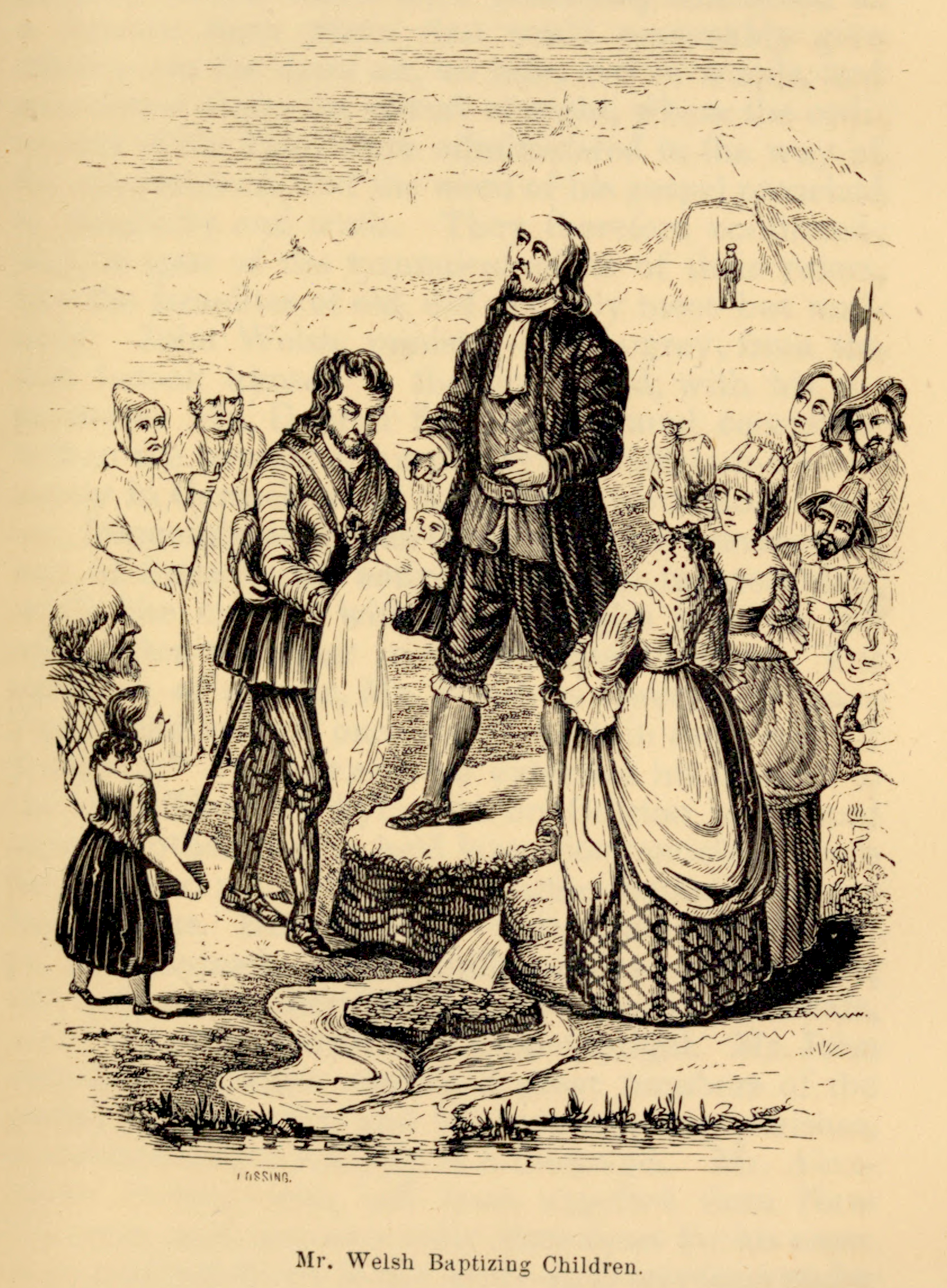
etching of Mr. Welch baptising children

=== Early life ===
Traill was born at Elie in Fife in 1642. Robert's father was also a preacher, Robert Traill of Greyfriars. His father was well known, being born in 1603, the son of Colonel James Trail, of Killcleary, Ireland, Gentleman of the Privy Chamber to Henry, Prince of Wales, and grandson of the Laird of Blebo, and Matilda Melvill of Carnbee. His mother, if Janet Annand (1605 - 1650), died while Robert was still young, although the Dictionary of National Biography records a Jean Annand who was imprisoned in 1665 for corresponding with her husband.

Robert Traill's early education was carefully superintended by his father, and at the University of Edinburgh he distinguished himself both in the literary and theological classes. At the age of nineteen he stood beside James Guthrie, his father's friend, on the scaffold.

=== Career ===
He was for some time tutor or chaplain in the family of Scot of Scotstarvet, and was afterwards much with John Welsh, the minister of Irongray, who was the first to hold ‘armed conventicles.’ He became a lifelong friend of William Guthrie of Fenwick, author of "The Christian's Great Interest".

In 1666, he was obliged to lurk for some time, together with his mother and elder brother; because some copies of a book, intitled, "An apologetic relation, &c", which the privy council had ordered to be publicly burnt, were found in Mrs Traill's house. In a proclamation of 1667 he was denounced as a 'Pentland rebel' and excepted from the act of indemnity. It is uncertain whether he was present at that engagement or not; but he fled to Holland, where he joined his father, who had been there for about four years, and other Scottish exiles.

There he continued his theological studies, and assisted Nethenius, professor at Utrecht, in preparing for the press Samuel Rutherford's ‘Examen Arminianismi.’

In 1669 he was in London, and in 1670 was ordained to a presbyterian charge at Cranbrook in Kent.

=== Arrest ===
He visited Edinburgh in 1677, when he was arrested by the privy council and charged with breaking the law. He admitted that he had preached in private houses, but, refusing to purge himself by oath from the charge of taking part in holding conventicles, he was sent as a prisoner to the Bass Rock in the Firth of Forth. The sentence of in July 1677 read:

"Forasmuch as the Lords of his Majesty's Privy Council, finding by the Report of the Committee anent Public Affairs, that Mr Robert Traill, son of the deceased Mr Robert Traill, against whom letters of intercommuning are direct, and who is excepted forth of his Majesty's gracious act of indemnity for his being in the rebellion in the year 1666, being apprehended within the city of Edinburgh, and brought before the said Committee, and examined if since his last coming to this kingdom he had kept any house or field conventicles, did acknowledge he had kept house conventicles, but said he left it to proof as to field conventicles; and the verity thereof being referred to his own oath he refused to depone; and confessed he had conversed with Mr John Welsh on the borders, and had assisted him at preaching in the fields, but especially upon the borders of the English side, where he said he had stayed for the most part since he came last to Scotland; and that he had been in and about Edinburgh since the end of May last; and that being interrogated by what authority he took upon him to preach, he declared that, in the year 1670, he was ordained minister by some Presbyterian ministers at London; and acknowledged that he had seen the printed act of indemnity out of which his name is excepted: The said Lords do ordain the said Mr Robert Traill to be sent prisoner to the Bass, until the Council consider what further shall be done with him."

On the same day,

"The Lords of his Majesty's Privy Council do grant warrant and order to the Lord Marquis of Athole, to command such a party of horse as he shall think fit to transport the person of Mr Robert Traill from the Tolbooth of Edinburgh unto the Isle of the Bass, to remain prisoner there."

Having given a promise to stop his outdoor meetings, which satisfied the government, he was liberated a few months afterwards and returned to his charge in Kent. He afterwards migrated to a Scots church in London, where he spent the rest of his life.

== Death and legacy ==
Traill died on 16 May 1716 at the age of seventy-four. His brother William, the minister of Borthwick, has had many clerical descendants of note, both in the church of Scotland and in the church of Ireland - among the latter James Traill, bishop of Down and Connor (Hew Scott, Fasti, i. 266).

A collective edition of Trail's works was published in 1745 (Edinburgh, 4 vols.); other editions Glasgow, 1776 3 vols., 1795 4 vols., 1806 4 vols. (which is the best edition), Edinburgh, 1810 4 vols. These included additional works from his manuscripts: ‘Steadfast Adherence to the Profession of our Faith, from Hebrews x. 23;’ ‘Sermons from 1 Peter i. 1–4;’ ‘Sermons on Galatians ii. 21.’ Further sermons from manuscripts in the hands of his relatives were published in 1845 by the Free Church of Scotland.

== Family ==
According to some sources Robert married Hellenor Traill and had several children: James, born 10 March 1651; Helen, born 1644, Agnes, 1646–1690; and Margaret, January 1648 – 1617. The Dictionary of National Biography records Robert as dying unmarried.

== Publications ==
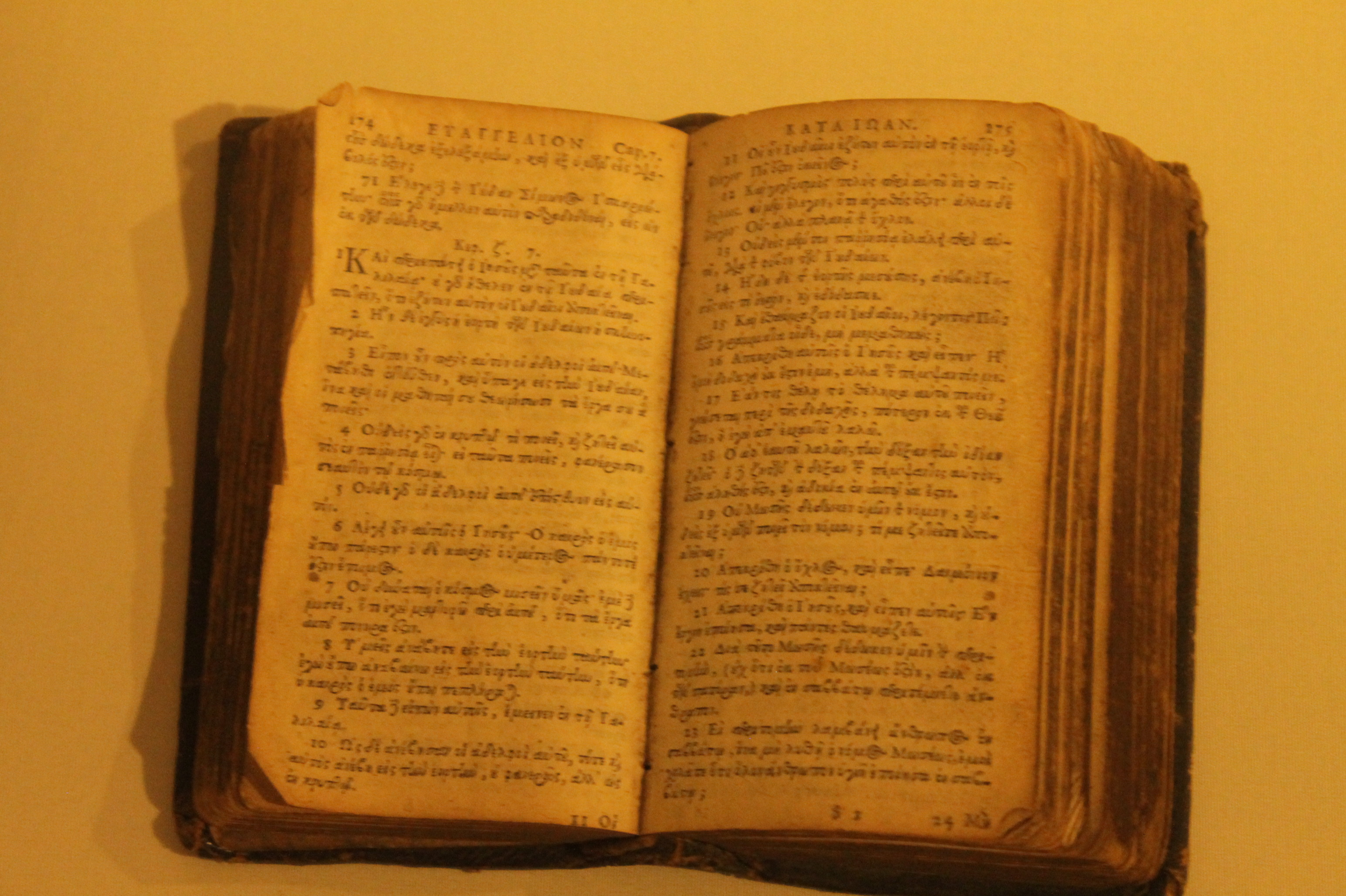
Rev Robert Traill's New Testament (1656)

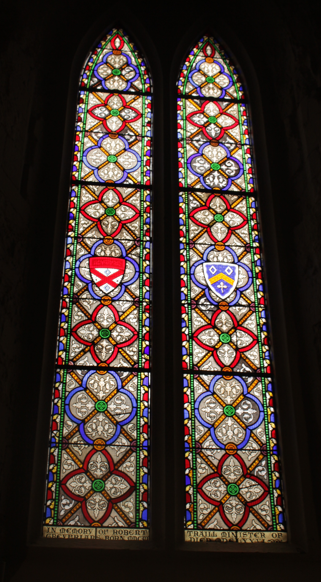
Memorial window to Rev Traill, Greyfriars Kirk

His first short publication did not occur until he was forty years old and the next did not appear until he was fifty. In 1682 he published a sermon, ‘By what means can ministers best win souls?’ and in 1692 a letter to a minister in the country - supposed to be his eldest brother, William (1640–1714), minister of Borthwick, Midlothian - entitled ‘A Vindication of the Protestant Doctrine concerning Justification and of its Preachers and Professors from the unjust Charge of Antinomianism.’ This ‘angry letter,’ as Dr. Calamy calls it, was occasioned by the violent controversy which broke out among the dissenting ministers of London after the republication in 1690 of the works of Dr. Tobias Crisp. Donald Macleod called it "unrivalled". Charges of Antinomianism were made on the one side and of Arminianism on the other, and Traill was distinguished for his zeal against Arminianism. A somewhat similar controversy, known as the Marrow Controversy, followed in Scotland, and as Boston of Ettrick and others took the same side as Traill, his works became very popular among them and their adherents. He afterwards published ‘Sermons on the Throne of Grace from Heb. iv. 16’ (3rd edit. 1731), and ‘Sermons on the Prayer of Our Saviour, John xvii. 24.’ These works were devout, plain, and edifying, and were in great favour with those who were attached to evangelical religion.

== Works ==
His published works include;

1. A Sermon on " By what means may ministers best win souls " (1682)
2. Vindication of the Protestant Doctrine concerning Justification, and of its Preachers and Professors, from the unjust charge of Antinomianism. (1692)
3. Thirteen Discourses on the Throne of Grace, from Heb. iv. 16.
4. Sixteen Sermons on the Prayer of our Saviour in John xvii. 24.
5. Stedfast Adherence to the Profession of our Faith, in twenty-one Sermons on Heb. x. 23.
6. Eleven Sermons on 1 Peter i. 1–4.
7. Six Sermons on Galatians ii. 21.

Numbers 5–7 were published posthumously as were 10 additional sermons found by some of his descendants.
