= David Dickson (minister) =

Scottish theologian and minister

- People repairing to David Dickson's lecture
- Born: 1583; Glasgow
- Died: 1663 (aged 79–80)
- Education: University of Glasgow
- Occupations: Pastor, Theologian
- Theological work
- Tradition or movement: Calvinism

David Dickson (1583–1663) was a Church of Scotland minister and theologian.

He preached in Irvine before becoming a Professor of theology at Glasgow University. He and Alexander Henderson led the protests against the Book of Common Prayer in 1637.

== Life ==
=== Early life and church career ===
David Dickson of Busby was born in Glasgow in 1583. He was the son of John Dickson, a wealthy local merchant with premises on the Trongate. He was at first intended for the mercantile profession, but after a lengthy illness, he studied for the Church. After studying at Glasgow University he gained an M.A. around 1601. He was then appointed Regent of Philosophy in the University. On 31 March 1618. he was ordained as minister of Irvine.

In 1620 he was named in a leet of seven to be a minister in Edinburgh, but since he was suspected of nonconformity his nomination was not pressed.

Having publicly testified against the Five Articles of Perth, he was at the instance of James Law, archbishop of Glasgow, summoned to appear before the high court of commission at Edinburgh on 9 January 1622; but having declined the jurisdiction of the court, he was subsequently deprived of his ministry in Irvine, and ordered to proceed to Turriff, Aberdeenshire, within twenty days. When he was about to set off northward, the Archbishop of Glasgow, at the request of the Earl of Eglinton, permitted him to remain in Ayrshire, at Eglinton, where for about two months he preached in the hall and courtyard of the castle. As great crowds went from Irvine to hear him, he was then ordered to set out for Turriff, but about the end of July 1623 was permitted to return to his charge at Irvine, and remained there unmolested till 1637.

In 1637, having given shelter to Robert Blair and John Livingston, driven from their charges in Ireland by the interference of the bishops there, he was again cited before the High Commission Court. No charges were brought against him.

=== Protests ===
In 1637 an attempt was made to enforce the English Service-Book, which he and his Presbytery moderately but firmly opposed.

Along with Alexander Henderson and Andrew Cant, he attended the private meeting convened in 1637 by Lord Lorne, against the bishops. The same year he prevailed on the presbytery of Irvine for the suspension of the service-book, and he was one of the deputation of noblemen and influential ministers deputed by the Covenanters to visit Aberdeen to invite ministers and gentry into the Covenant. The doctors and professors of Aberdeen were unconvinced, and after various encounters with the Covenanters published General Demandis concerning the lait Covenant, &c. 1638, reprinted 1662 to which Henderson and Dickson drew up a reply entitled Ansueris of sum Bretheren of the Ministrie to the Replyis of the Ministeris and Professoris of Divinity at Abirdein, 1638, reprinted 1663. This was answered by the Aberdeen professors in Duplyes of the Minsteris and Professoris of Abirdein, 1638.

At the assembly which met at Glasgow in 1638 Alexander Henderson was chosen in preference to Dickson to fill the chair, but Dickson delivered a tactful speech when the commissioner threatened to leave the assembly, and in the eleventh session gave a learned discourse on Arminianism. The assembly also named him one of the four inspectors to be set over the university cities, the city to which he was named being Glasgow; but in his case the resolution was not carried out till 1640, when he was appointed to the newly instituted professorship of divinity. In the army of the covenanters, under Alexander Leslie, which encamped at Dunse Law in June 1639, he acted as chaplain of the Ayrshire regiment, commanded by the Earl of Loudoun, and at the general assembly which, after the pacification, met at Edinburgh in August of the same year, was chosen moderator.

=== Academic career ===
He was appointed the first Professor of Divinity at Glasgow University in January 1640 and later that year was elected Moderator of the General Assembly.

In 1643 he was appointed, along with Alexander Henderson and David Calderwood, to draw up a 'Directory for Public Worship'. He was also joint author with James Durham, who afterwards succeeded him in the professorship in Glasgow, of The Sum of Saving Knowledge, frequently printed along with the Westminster Confession of Faith and catechisms, although it never received the formal sanction of the church.

In 1650 he took a new post as Professor of Divinity at Edinburgh University. He delivered an inaugural address in Latin, which was translated by George Sinclair into English, and, under the name of 'Truth's Victory over Error,' was published as Sinclair's own in 1684. The piracy having been detected, it was republished with Dickson's name attached and a Life of Dickson by Robert Wodrow in 1752.

He was appointed to St Giles Cathedral (second charge) by the Town Council 12 April 1650, and admitted shortly after. Dickson was for a second time Moderator of Assembly 21 July 1652.

In 1650 he was appointed by the committee of the kirk one of a deputation to congratulate Charles II on his arrival in Scotland.

=== Later life ===
For declining to take the oath of supremacy at the Restoration he was ejected from his chair in October 1662 he was deprived; he died at the end of that year (buried 31 December).

He was a popular preacher, and highly instrumental in promoting the notable revival at Stewarton about 1625. Nor was he less zealous and useful in the overthrow of Episcopacy, having taken a prominent part in the business of the Assembly at Glasgow. When the Church unhappily divided into Resolutioners and Protesters, he became a leader in the party of the former.

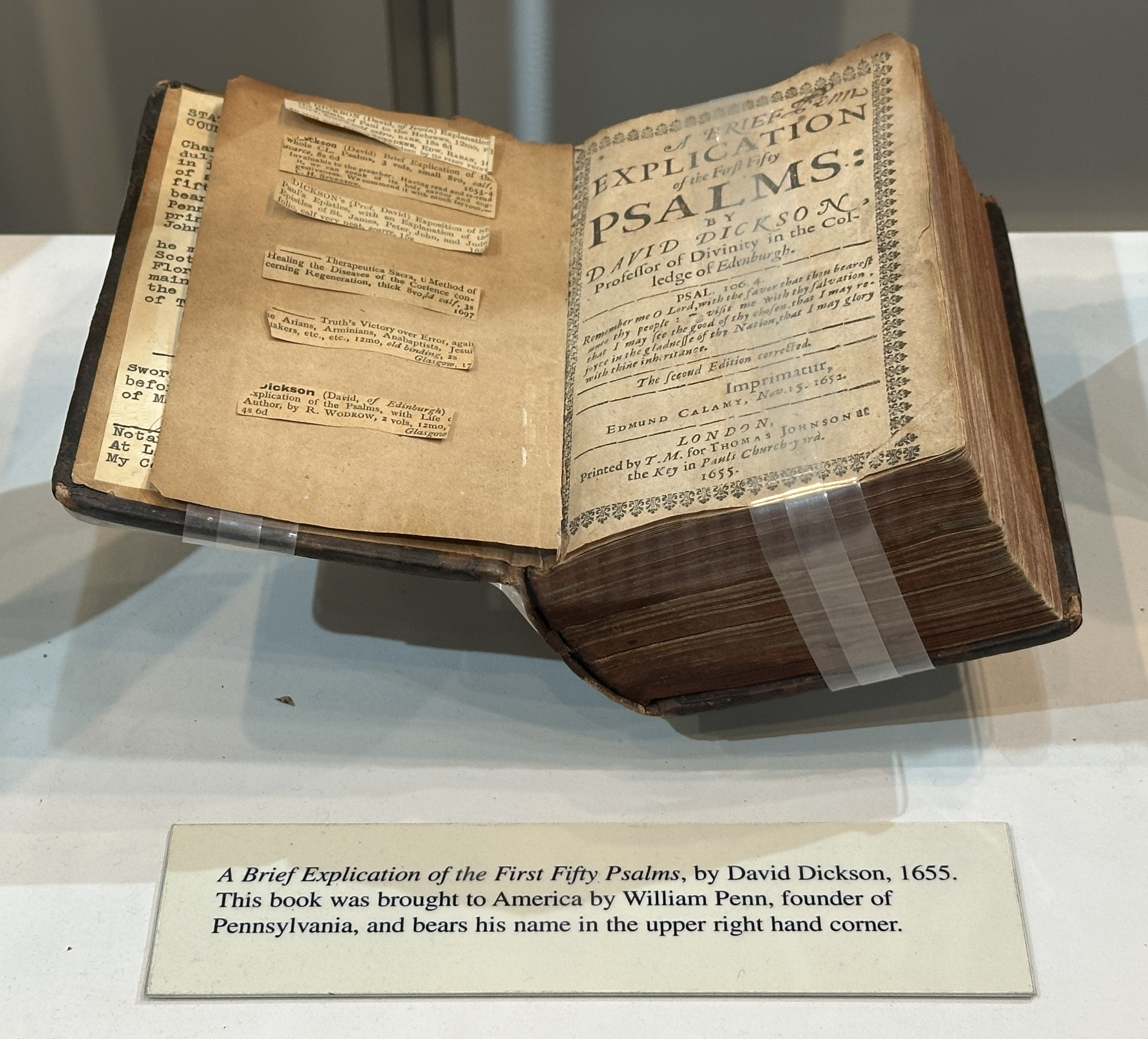
Dickson wrote A Brief Explication of the First Fifty Psalms in 1655.

== Personal life ==
On 23 September 1617 he married Margaret Roberton, a daughter of Archibald Roberton of Stonehall (the youngest son of John Roberton, the 9th Laird of Earnock) and sister of James Roberton, Lord Bedlay. They had several sons, of whom John, the eldest, was clerk to the exchequer in Scotland, and Alexander, the second son, was professor of Hebrew in the University of Edinburgh. Other sons included James (G. R. Sas., xxxviii., 241); David (who predeceased him) and Archibald. Another Robert, born in 1630 in Irvine, Ayrshire settled in Ulster, Ireland in 1666.

== Works ==
Besides the works already referred to, he was the author of:

- 'A Treatise on the Promises,' 1630.
- 'Praelectiones in Confessionem Fidei. Truth's Victory over Error,' 1684.
- 'Explanation of the Epistle to the Hebrews,' 1685.
- 'Expositio analytica omnium Apostolicarum Epistolarum,' 1646.
- 'A Brief Exposition of the Gospel according to Matthew,' 1651.
- 'Explanation of the First Fifty Psalms,' 1653.
- 'Explication upon the Last Fifty Psalms,' 1655.
- 'A Brief Explication of the Psalms from L to C,' 1655.
- 'Therapeutica Sacra, seu de curandis Casibus Conscientiae circa Regenerationem per Foederum Divinorum applicationem,' 1656, of which an edition by his son, Alexander Dickson, entitled 'Therapeutica Sacra, or Cases of Conscience resolved,' was published in 1664. An English translation, entitled 'Therapeutica Sacra, or the Method of healing the Diseases of the Conscience concerning Regeneration,' in 1695.
- several pamphlets in the Disputes with the Doctors of Aberdeen, and some in defence of the Public Resolutions.
- The "Directory for Public Worship" was drawn up by him, with the assistance of Alexander Henderson and David Calderwood - and the "Sum of Saving Knowledge," in conjunction with James Durham.
- Some minor poems, "The Christian Sacrifice," and "O Mother dear, Jerusalem."

His various commentaries were published in conjunction with a number of other ministers, each of whom, in accordance with a project initiated by Dickson, had particular books of the 'hard parts of scripture' assigned them. He was also the author of a number of short poems on pious and serious subjects, to be sung with the common tunes of the Psalms. Among them were 'The Christian Sacrifice,' 'O Mother dear, Jerusalem,' 'True Christian Love,' and 'Honey Drops, or Crystal Streams.' Several of his manuscripts were printed among his Select Works, published with a life in 1838.
