= Andrew Cant (minister) =

Presbyterian minister and leader of the Scottish Covenanters (1584–1663)

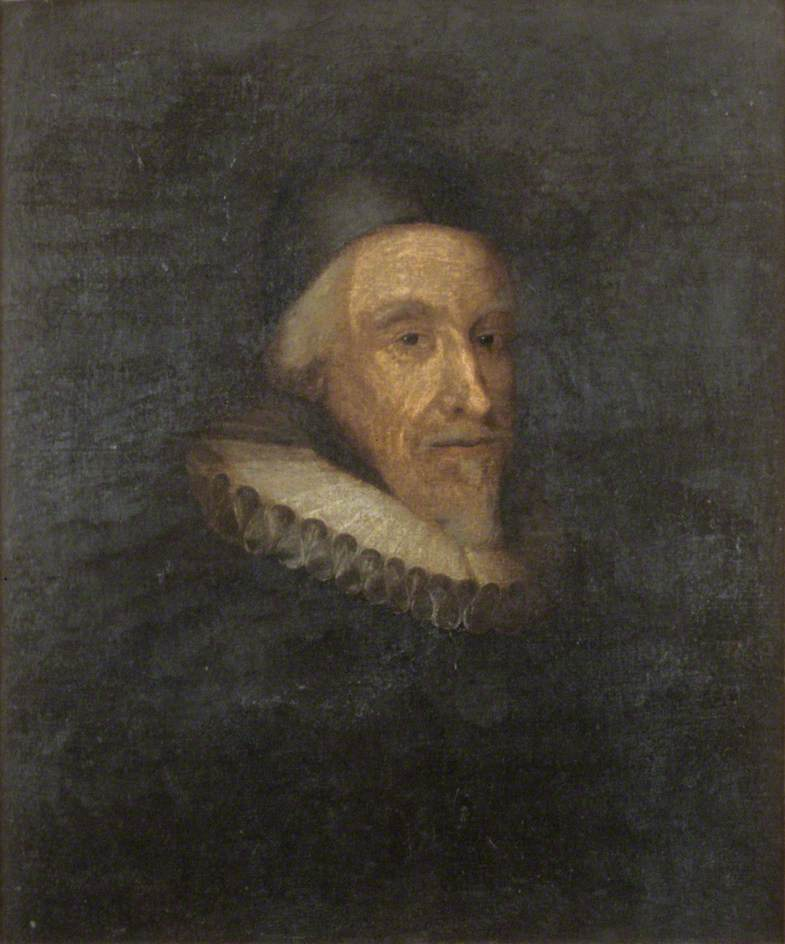
- Andrew Cant att. to George Jamesone

Personal details
- Born: 1584 Aberdeen
- Died: 1663 (aged 78–79)
- Spouse: Margaret Irvine
- Children: 5, including Andrew Cant
- Education: Aberdeen Grammar School
- Alma mater: King's College, Aberdeen

Andrew Cant (1584–1663) was a Presbyterian minister and leader of the Scottish Covenanters. About 1623 the people of Edinburgh called him to be their minister, but he was rejected by James I. Ten years later he was minister of Pitsligo in Aberdeenshire, a charge which he left in 1638 for that of Newbattle in Midlothian. In July of that year he went with other commissioners to Aberdeen in the vain attempt to induce the university and the presbytery of that city to subscribe the National Covenant, and in the following November sat in the general assembly at Glasgow which abolished episcopacy in Scotland. In 1638 Cant was minister of Pitsligo in Aberdeenshire. In 1640 he was chaplain to the Scottish army and then settled as minister in Aberdeen. Though a staunch Covenanter, he was a zealous Royalist, preaching before Charles I in Edinburgh, and stoutly advocating the restoration of the monarchy in the time of the Commonwealth. Cant's frequent and bitter verbal attacks on various members of his congregation led in 1661 to complaints laid before the magistrates, in consequence of which he resigned his charge.

== Early life and education ==
Andrew Cant, the elder, was born in 1584. Nothing definitely is known as about his parentage, though it is supposed with some show of reason that he was a native of Aberdeen, and connected with the family of Walter Cant, formerly a bailie of Leith, who on 1 October 1548, was admitted to the Guildry of Aberdeen. He has also been described as a native of Haddingtonshire, and of the Mearns, and the son of a dependant of the Earl Marischal. Educated at Aberdeen Grammar School and King's College, Aberdeen, he graduated MA. in 1612.

== Early employment ==
Cant was appointed Humanist in King's College in 1614. He was subsequently admitted as minister of Afford sometime before 13 December 1617. This post he demitted after 26 October 1629, on becoming tutor to the only son of Alexander Forbes, Lord Pitsligo. He was then admitted to Pitsligo before 20 November 1633.

== Church and political endeavours ==
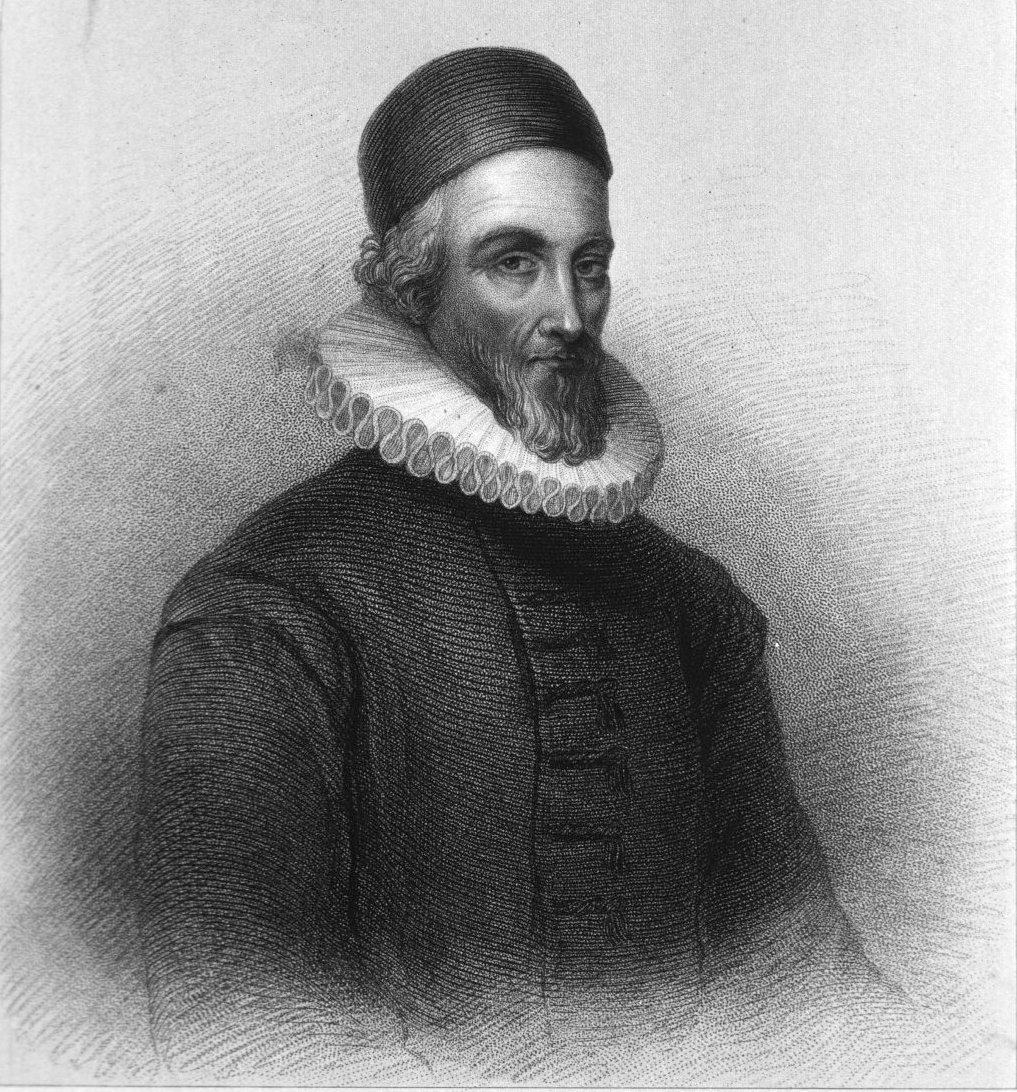
Andrew Cant. Engraving of Jamesone's painting

Cant endeavoured to get up supplications to the Privy Council from the North against the Service Book October 1637, and accompanied Henderson of Leuchars and Dickson of Irvine to Aberdeen, with this view, towards the end of that year.

Unlike most Aberdonian ministers, Cant was a strong champion of the covenants and opponent of the episcopising endeavours of the king. In July 1638 he was appointed by the "commissioners at the tables," with two other ministers (Dickson and Henderson) and three noblemen (Montrose, Kinghorn, and Cowper), to endeavour to bring the people of the north into sympathy with the presbyterian cause. The reception of the commissioners by the magistrates of Aberdeen was amusing, the magistrates meeting them and offering them the hospitality of the city, which the commissioners declined, till they should see if they would take the covenant. The "Aberdeen doctors" were famous in the church for their opposition to the covenant, and prepared certain questions for the commissioners, which led to a wordy series of answers, replies, and duplies on either side. The feeling was so strong that the commissioners were excluded from the Aberdeen pulpits, and had to preach in the open air.

Cant was a member of the Assembly which met at Glasgow in 1638. Following this he translated, to Newbattle on 20 May 1639. He also served as chaplain with the Scots army at Newcastle in 1640. He elected to St Nicolas', Aberdeen by a Committee of Assembly and admitted on 24 March 1641.

While one of the sticklers for the covenants, he was a devoted royalist. On one occasion, in the time of Cromwell, when many English officers were in his church, he uttered so strong sentiments on duty to the king and on the conduct of those who were against him that the officers rose up, some of them drawing their swords and advancing towards the pulpit. The intrepid minister opened his breast, and said to them, ‘Here is the man who uttered these sentiments,’ inviting them to strike him if they dared. "He had once been a captain," says Wodrow, who tells the story, "and was one of the most bold and resolute men of his day." His courage, with his popular eloquence, gave him wide fame.

Cant was a member of all the Commissions of Assembly, 1642-9. Financially, Cant had 2000 merks allowed him by Parliament, 4 February 1646, for his services and losses. Andrew Cant was elected Moderator of the General Assembly on 10 July 1650. Joined the Protesters in 1651 taking their side against the Resolutioners. Cant became rector of King's College in 1651. Cant is said to have been deposed on a charge of circulating Rutherford's Lex Rex, but probably demitted in 1660.

== Death and legacy ==
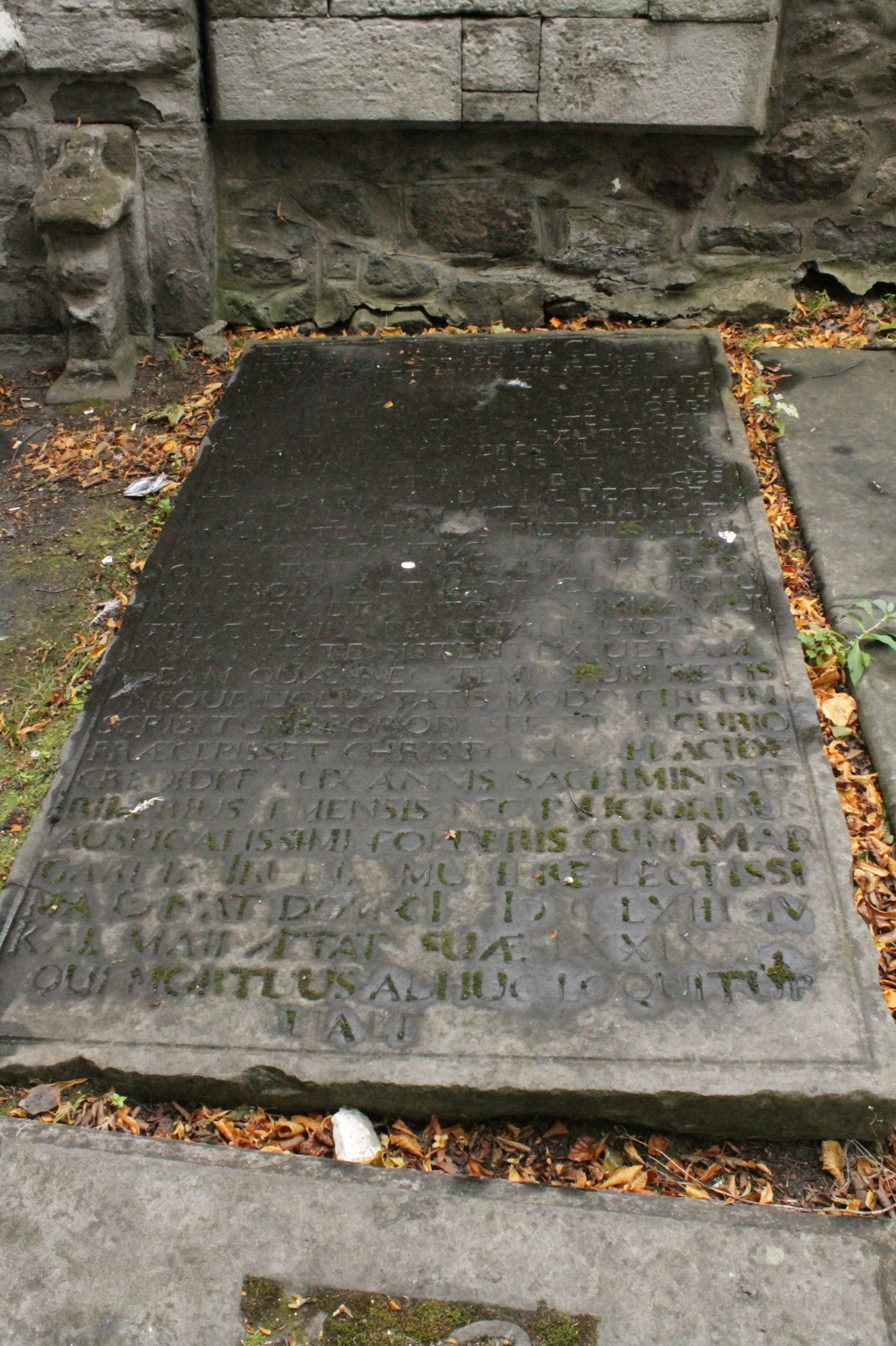
The grave of Rev Andrew Cant, St Nicholas Churchyard in Aberdeen. The inscription and translation are given by Alex M. Munro.

He died on 27 April 1663. He is buried in the graveyard of the Kirk of St Nicholas on Union Street. The flat slab marking is grave lies midway along the west wall. It gives his birthdate as 1584. He was described as the most actively convinced supporter of the Covenant in the North of Scotland, a man of great moral earnestness and courage, and was one of those summoned before the Privy Council, 9 December 1662, for seditious carriage.

== Works ==
- On the Titles of Our Blessed Saviour (Aberdeen, n.d.)
- Sermon preached in the Greyfriars Church, Edinburgh, in June 1638 (Edinburgh, 1699 and 1720)
- The Evil and Danger of Prelacy (Edinburgh, 1699 and 1720; Glasgow, 1741)
- Essay on Church Government (Edinburgh, 1703)
- A Discourse and Exhortation at renewing the National Covenant(Hamilton, 1713; Edinburgh, 1727; Glasgow, 1741 and 1841)

== Family ==
He married Margaret Irvine, who was buried 28 March 1679, and had issue —

- James
- Alexander, minister of Banchory-Ternan
- Andrew (Principal of University of Edinburgh 1675–1685).
- Margaret, died unmarried 1660
- Sarah (married 4 May 1647, as his second wife, Alexander Jaffray of Kingswells), died a Quaker in 1673.

== Bibliography ==
- Lamont's Diary, 10, 21
- Scottish Notes and Queries, iii., 84-8
- Aberdeen Sasines, i. 187, v. 121, 359
- Watt's Aberdeen, 258, 262
- Wodrow's Analecta, ii 154, 161, 189, 374; iii, 126, 414
- Select Biographies [Wodrow Society], i., 311.

Academic offices
Unknown	Rector of King's College, Aberdeen; 1651 – ?	Unknown
