= Scotland under the Commonwealth =

Overview of Scottish history under the Commonwealth of England

Oliver Cromwell, whose military victories at Dunbar and Worcester opened the way for the creation of the union of the Commonwealth and who emerged as its dominant figure as Lord Protector

Scotland under the Commonwealth is the history of the Kingdom of Scotland between the declaration that the kingdom was part of the Commonwealth of England in February 1652, and the Restoration of the monarchy with Scotland regaining its position as an independent kingdom, in June 1660.

After the execution of Charles I in 1649, the Scottish Parliament declared his son Charles II to be King of Scotland, England and Ireland. The English responded with an invasion led by Oliver Cromwell, resulting in defeats for the Scots at Dunbar and then at Worcester, opening the way for the English conquest of the country. Under the Tender of Union, Scotland was declared part of a Commonwealth with England and Ireland in 1652, but despite repeated attempts, an act was not passed in Westminster to ratify the union until 1657. Under the terms of the union, the Scots gained 30 members of parliament, but many posts were not filled, or fell to English agents of the government, and had very little say at Westminster. Initially the government was run by eight commissioners and adopted a policy of undermining the political power of the nobility in favour of the "meaner sort". From 1655 it was replaced by a new Council of Scotland, headed by Irish peer Lord Broghill, and began attempts to win over the traditional landholders. The regime built a series of major citadels and minor forts at immense cost. The Scottish legal system was suspended, but some courts and institutions were gradually restored. Generally the regime was successful in enforcing law and order and suppressing banditry. There was a major Royalist rising in the Highlands in 1653–1655 led by William Cunningham, Earl of Glencairn and John Middleton. After initial success, it suffered from internal divisions and petered out after defeat at the Battle of Dalnaspidal in 1654.

The Commonwealth extended toleration to Protestants, including sectaries, but the only significant group were a small number of Quakers. The Kirk that had been established at the Reformation and had been largely united since the Declaration of the Covenant in 1638, was divided into Resolutioners and more hard line Protesters by the issue of co-operation with the crown. The regime tended to favour the Protestors giving them control over the universities. The country was relatively highly taxed, but gained access to English markets. The era was remembered by one Presbyterian divine as one of prosperity, but not everywhere benefitted from economic expansion. There was an attempt to create national symbols with the revival of the Union Flag and unite coin. After the death of Oliver Cromwell and the fall of his son Richard's regime, General Monck marched the army in Scotland south and facilitated the Restoration of Charles II in 1660.

== Background ==
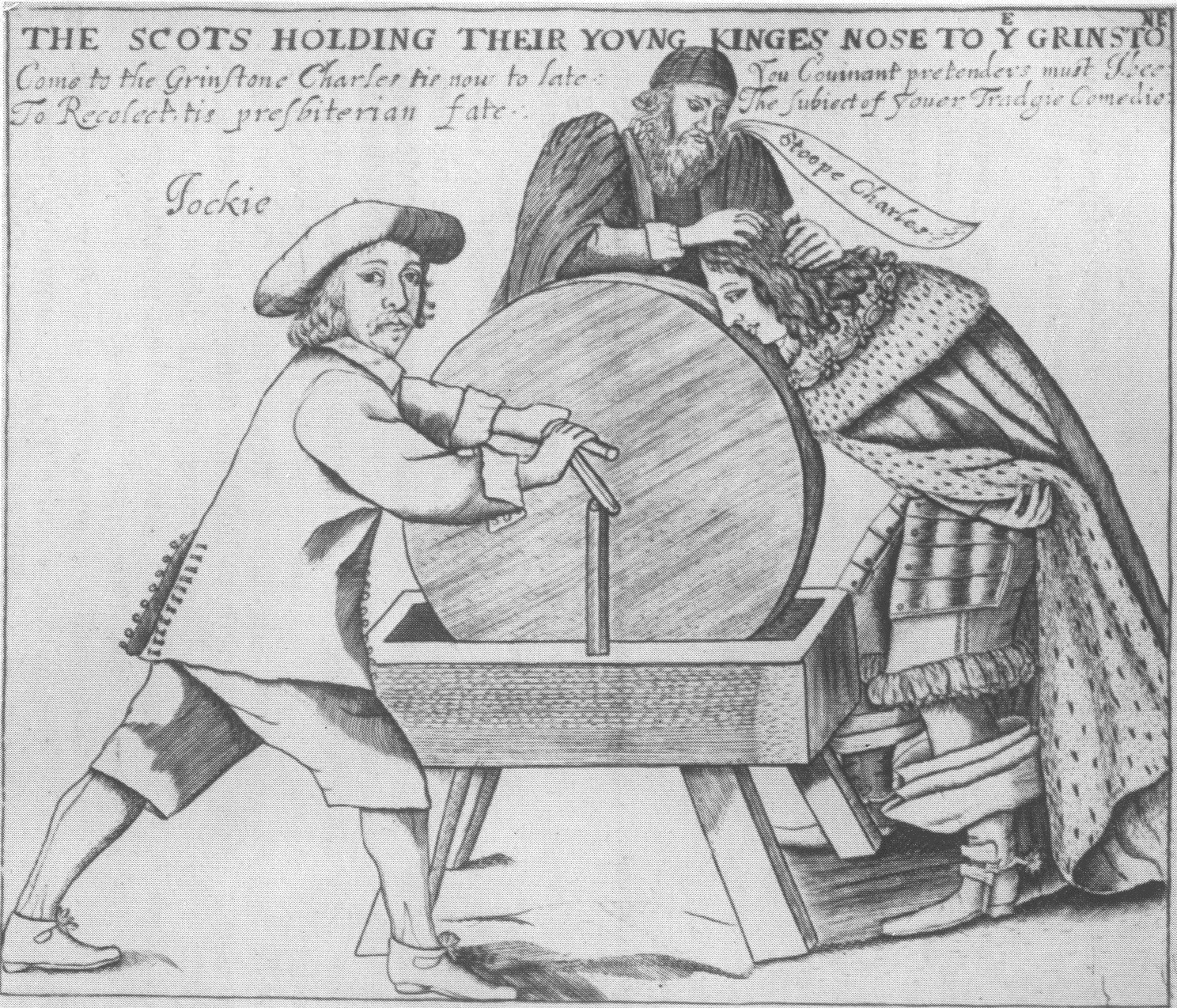
The Scots holding the young Charles II's nose to the grindstone of the Engagement, from a satirical English pamphlet.

Having supported Parliament in the First English Civil War (1642–46) under the Solemn League and Covenant, the Covenanter government in Scotland came under the control of the Engagers. As part of a Second English Civil War, they invaded England in support of royalist risings, and were defeated by the New Model Army under Oliver Cromwell at the Battle of Preston (1648). With many of its leaders captured, the Engagement regime fell in the Whiggamore Raid and the radical Presbyterian Kirk Party returned to power. After the execution of Charles I in January 1649, England was declared a Commonwealth. As soon as news of Charles I's execution reached Scotland, his son was proclaimed king as Charles II of Great Britain by the Scottish Parliament. After the failure of an attempted Highland rising led by James Graham, Marquis of Montrose, Charles accepted the offer of conditional support from the Covenanters, arriving in June 1650 and signing the Covenants. The English responded with an army of 16,000 under Cromwell, which crossed the border in July 1650, while an English fleet acted in support. On 3 September 1650 the English army defeated the Scots under David Leslie at the Battle of Dunbar, taking over 10,000 prisoners and then occupying Edinburgh, taking control of the Lowlands. Charles could now more easily make an alliance with the moderate Covenanters. He was crowned at Scone on 1 January 1651 and a new army was assembled. In June 1651 Cromwell advanced against the Scots under Leslie at Stirling. The Scots army with the King set off for England, but there was no rising in their favour, and the army was caught at Worcester by forces under Cromwell. On 3 September it was decisively defeated, bringing the civil wars to an end. Charles escaped to the continent, an English army under George Monck mopped up the remaining garrisons in Scotland and Cromwell emerged as the most important figure in the Commonwealth.

== Constitutional status ==
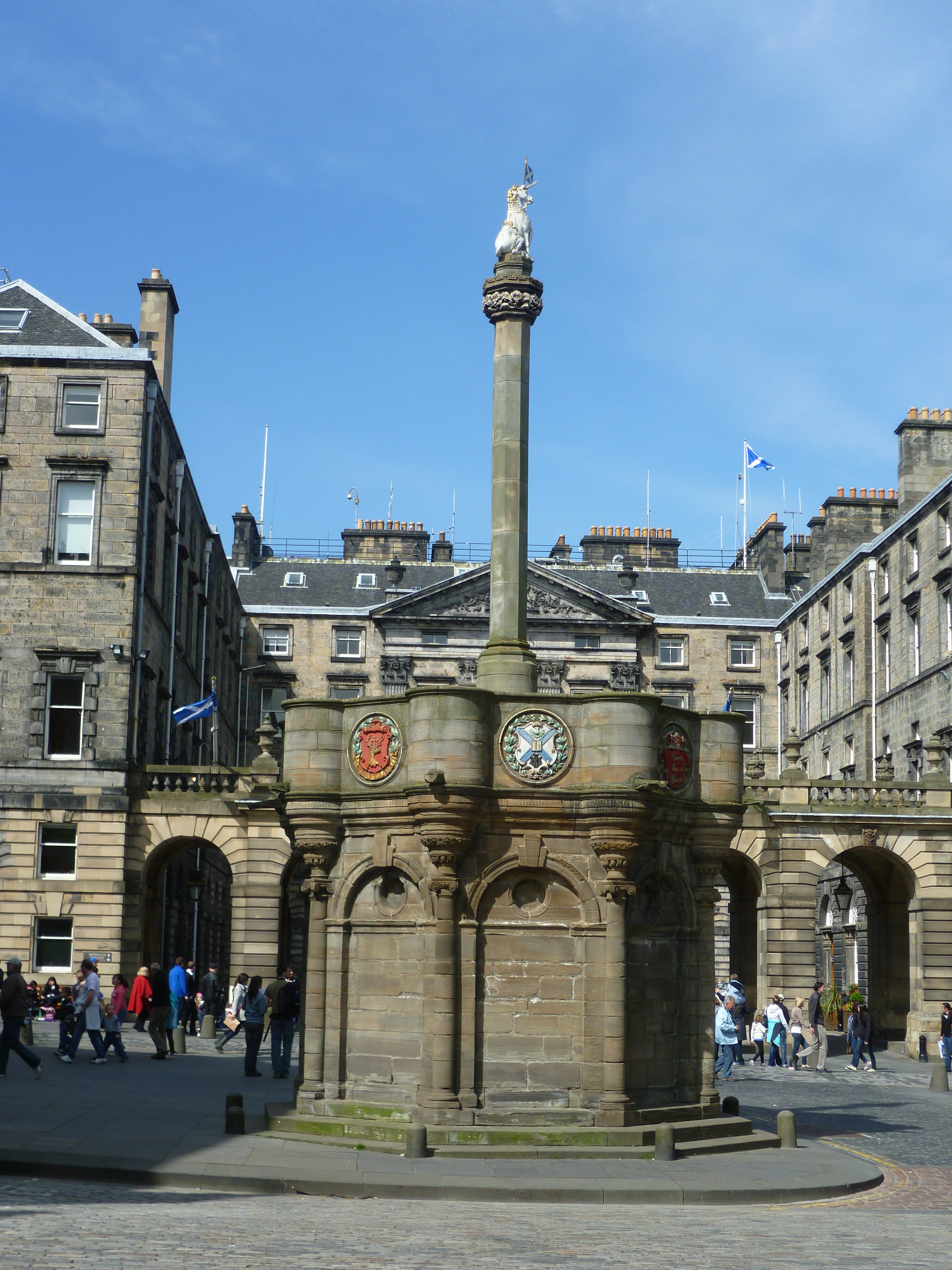
The Mercat Cross on the Royal Mile in Edinburgh, where the Tender of Union was proclaimed in February 1652

Six days after the victory at Worcester, a committee of the English Rump parliament was established with the aim of drafting a bill that would declare "the right of the Commonwealth to so much of Scotland as is now under [its] force". By December this plan for simple annexation had softened, considering "the good of this island", for one in which Scotland would be incorporated into the "free state and Commonwealth of England". This "Tender of Union" was proclaimed at the mercat cross in Edinburgh by eight trumpeters on 4 February 1652. Three days later, the King's arms were taken down from the cross and ceremoniously hanged from the public gallows. Eventually 29 out of 31 shires and 44 of the 58 burghs assented to the Tender and subscribed to the oath that "Scotland be incorporated into and made one Commonwealth with England".

On 3 April 1652 a bill for an Act for incorporating Scotland into one Commonwealth with England was given a first and a second reading in the Rump Parliament, but it failed to return from its committee stage before the Rump was dissolved. A similar act was introduced into the Barebones Parliament, but it too failed to be enacted before that parliament was dissolved. On 12 April 1654, the Council of State issued and Ordinance for uniting Scotland into one Commonwealth with England, which would be the "Commonwealth of England, Scotland and Ireland", under the authority of the Instrument of Government that made Cromwell Lord Protector. This remained the legal basis of the union until the Ordinance became an Act of Union under the Second Protectorate Parliament on 26 June 1657.

Under the terms of the union Scotland received thirty seats in the enlarged Westminster parliament, ten from the burghs and twenty from the shires. There were only five Scottish members out of 140 in the Barebones parliament and only twenty-one were sent to the Protector's first parliament (1654–55). It was not until the Protector's second parliament (1656–57) that thirty were sent. For Richard Cromwell's parliament in 1658–59, of the thirty elected, only eleven were Scots, and, of the remainder, ten were army officers. The Scots in Westminster were treated with general xenophobia, and, when not ignored, they faced repeated motions to exclude them. One Englishman described them as "a wooden leg tied to a natural body".

== Administration ==
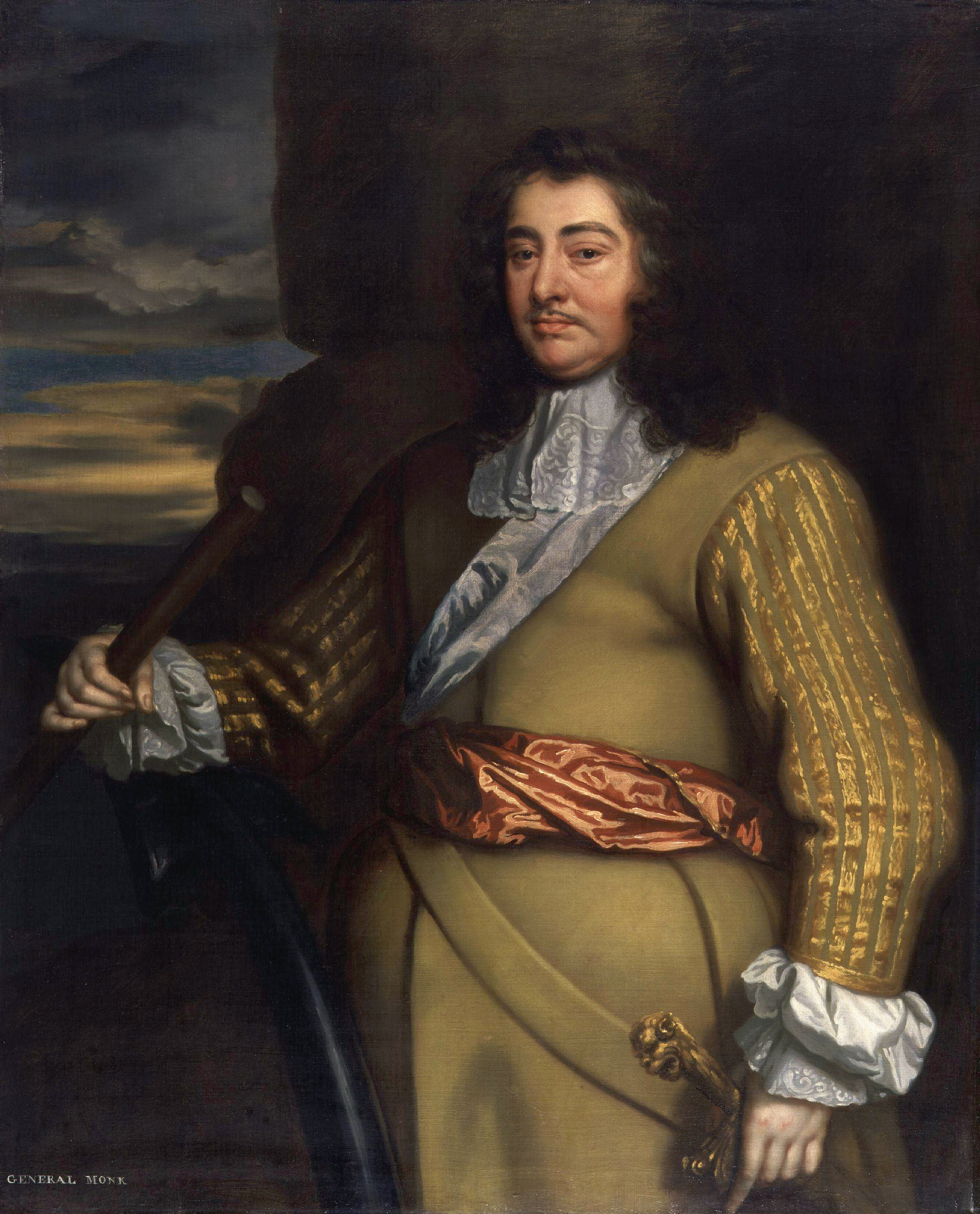
George Monck, the military governor of Scotland under the Commonwealth, who then played a key role in the end of the regime

Under the Tender of Union, the Scottish Parliament was removed, along with the monarchy, and no institution could meet except with the sanction of the Westminster parliament. Initially the country was run by eight English commissioners: Oliver St John, Sir Henry Vane, Richard Salwey, George Fenwick, John Lambert, Richard Deane, Robert Tichborne, and George Monck. In its early stages the regime deliberately attempted to break the influence of the Scottish nobility who had organised invasions of England in 1648 and 1651. Many were in exile, prison, deprived of office or heavily burdened with fines and debt. Instead the Commonwealth attempted to promote what Cromwell called the "meaner sort", particularly urban elites and small landholders. In 1655 the Irish peer Lord Broghill arrived in Scotland to act as President of the new Council in Scotland. This was part of an attempt to recast the government along civilian lines and to begin to win over the major landholders to the regime. The council was made up of six Englishmen, Monck, Samuel Disbrowe, Charles Howard, Adrian Scrope, Thomas Cooper and Nathaniel Whetham, and two Scots, John Swinton and William Lockhart, they were later joined by Sir Edward Rhodes as a ninth member.

From late 1651, passes were needed to move from one area of the country to another. The ownership of firearms was restricted, necessitating a licence. In the Highlands the administration fell back on the ancient expedient of making clan chiefs responsible for the conduct of their followers. The security of the regime depended on an armed force of never less than 10,000 men. Citadels were built at Ayr, Perth and Leith and 20 smaller forts were built as far away as Orkney and Stornoway. Control of the Highlands was secured by strongpoints at Inverlocky and Inverness. These were built at a massive cost of money and manpower. The citadel at Inverness, begun in 1652 and using stone shipped from as far away as Aberdeen, had cost £50,000 in 1655, when it was still unfinished. Inverlocky had a garrison of 1,000 and from 1654 became the centre for a new administrative region of Lochaber, made up of three of the most remote and lawless shires.

The Scottish legal system was effectively suspended after the English occupation. All courts that derived from "Charles Stuart", including Sheriff's Courts were suspended. Kirk sessions, however, continued to meet largely unhindered, neither sanctioned nor recognised by the Commonwealth. The legal functions of the Privy Council and Court of Session were taken over by seven commissioners, four Englishmen and three Scots. These proved more impartial than previous judges, probably because they were not tied to the major families and political factions by patronage and kinship. Local barony courts and heritable jurisdictions, in abeyance from 1651, were officially abolished in 1657. Sheriff's courts were re-established and Justices of the Peace returned in 1656. The result was a small flood of witchcraft cases, with 102 between 1657 and 1659, which compares with over 600 after the Scottish courts were fully re-established after 1660. Generally the regime has been seen by its supporters as successful in enforcing law and order, suppressing the banditry of moss-troopers. In 1655 it was claimed that "a man may ride all over Scotland with £100 in his pocket, which he could not have done these five hundred years".

== Resistance ==
William Cunningham, 9th Earl of Glencairn, leader of the major armed resistance to the Commonwealth regime in Scotland

In 1653–55 there was a major Royalist rising in the Highlands led by William Cunningham, 9th Earl of Glencairn (1610–64) and former Covenanter soldier John Middleton (1608–74). It was particularly threatening to the regime because it coincided with the First Dutch War (1652–54). Glencairn was given command of the Royalist forces in Scotland by Charles II. He convened a meeting of Scottish notables at Lochearn in August 1653. Among those present were John Murray, 1st Marquess of Atholl, Archibald Campbell, eldest son of the Marquis of Argyll, Lord Loin, Donald MacDonell of Glengarry, Ewen Cameron of Lochiel, John Graham of Duchray and Colonel Blackadder of Tullyallan. These notables then mustered their vassals and supporters to form a small army of about 60 horse, and a force of foot, made up of 60–80 Lowlanders and 150 Highlanders. The governor of Stirling Castle, Colonel Kidd, sallied out to suppress this force, but was defeated at Aberfoyle. This victory boosted morale and the rising gained some support from Lowland Scottish lords, forcing the Commonwealth government to adopt a more conciliatory attitude to these groups.

Although it gained recruits, the rising began to suffer from internal divisions, particularly between the Highlanders who made up the bulk of the forces and the Lowland nobles and officers who were their commanders. In early 1654, nine months into the revolt, Middleton, a Lowland officer and a veteran of the Battle of Worcester, arrived with a commission to command from Charles II. Despite objections from his followers, Glencairn surrendered control over his forces, which had now reached 3,500 foot and 1,500 horse. That evening Sir George Munro, Middleton's aide insulted Glencairn's forces and the result was a duel in which Munro was wounded. Glencairn was arrested. He would eventually be released and retire from the conflict. A series of other disputes and duels undermined the leadership of the campaign for the remainder of the rising.

Middleton adopted a strategy of raid and harrying. Although successful in distracting the Commonwealth forces and causing disruption, it soon began to prove counter-productive, as growing unpopularity led to a drying up of recruitment.With his return to Scotland after his brief naval command against the Dutch, Monck began a campaign against the rising, making forced marches of between 12 and 20 miles a day in difficult terrain. On 19 July 1654 a force from Monck's command under Thomas Morgan caught Middleton's army at Dalnaspidal. In the resulting battle the royalists were scattered and a wounded Middleton was forced to escape to the Highlands. The end of the Dutch War meant there was no possibility of foreign aid and government reinforcements were now available to combat the rising. As a result, the Royalist military effort petered out. Eventually, Glencairn surrendered to Monck and Middleton escaped to the continent to join the court in exile.

The rising forced a change of policy by the regime, which instead of attempting to replace the landholding classes now looked for a reconciliation with former Royalists and Engagers. This resulted in the Act of Grace and Pardon, proclaimed in Edinburgh on 5 May 1654. Instead of a blanket forfeiture among those implicated in resistance, it named 24 persons (mainly from the nobility) whose lands would be seized, and 73 other landholders who could retain their estates after paying a fine. Even then most of those names were treated with leniency and fines were remitted for confiscations, or were reduced, and some were abandoned.

== Religion ==
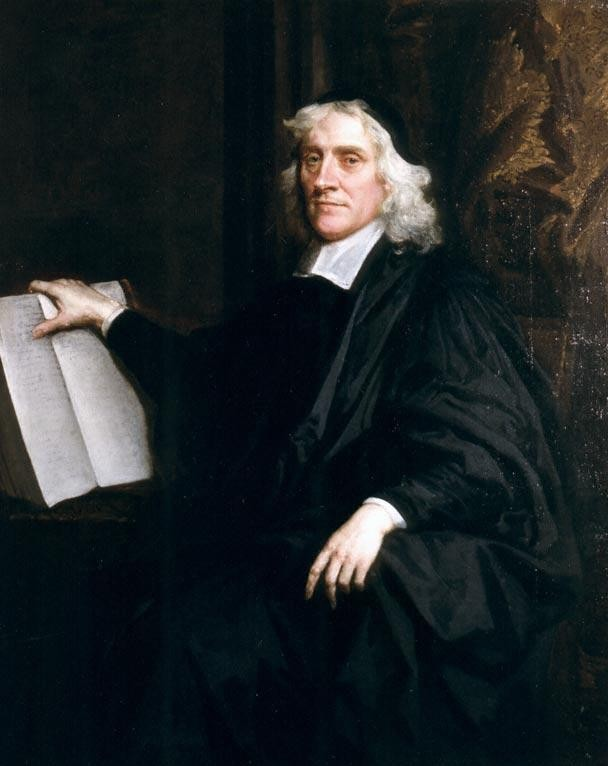
James Sharp, leading Resolutioner and later Archbishop of St. Andrews

The Kirk that had been established at the Reformation, had been largely united since the Declaration of the Covenant in 1638. In the period after the defeat at Dunbar, it became divided, partly in the search for scapegoats for defeat. Different factions and tendencies produced rival resolutions and protests, which gave their names to the two major parties as Resolutioners, who were willing to make an accommodation with royalism, and more hard line Protesters who wished to purge the Kirk of such associations. Subsequently, the divide between rival camps became almost irrevocable. After 1655 both groups appointed permanent agents in London.

The terms of the union promised that the Gospel would be preached and promised freedom of religion. The regime accepted Presbyterianism as a valid system, but did not accept that it was the only legitimate form of church organisation. The result was that, although civil penalties no longer backed up its pronouncements, Kirk sessions and synods functioned much as before. The administration tended to favour the Protesters, largely because the Resolutioners were more inclined to desire a restoration of the monarchy and because the General Assembly, where they predominated, claimed independence from the state. The act of holding public prayers for the success of Glencairn's insurrection led in 1653, to the largely Resolutioner members of the Assembly being marched out of Edinburgh by an armed guard. There were no more assemblies in the period of the Commonwealth and the Resolutioners met in informal "consultations" of clergy. The universities, largely seen as a training school for clergy, were relatively well funded and came under the control of the Protestors, with Patrick Gillespie being made Principal at Glasgow.

Toleration did not extend to Episcopalians and Catholics, but if they did not call attention to themselves they were largely left alone. It did extend to sectaries, but the only independent group to establish itself in Scotland in this period were a small number of Quakers. In general the period of the Commonwealth was looked back on as one where Protestantism flourished. Ministers, now largely barred from politics, spent more time with their flocks and placed an emphasis on preaching that emulated the sectaries. One Presbyterian noted that "there were more souls converted to Christ in that short period of time than in any season since the Reformation".

== Economy and taxation ==
Under the Commonwealth, the country was relatively highly taxed, but gained access to English markets. Under Charles I Scotland had paid about £17,000 sterling a year in taxes. In 1656 the civil list alone cost £25,000. The sum of £10,000 a month from the county assessment was demanded by the Cromwellian regime, which Scotland failed to fully supply and it was reduced to £6,000 a month in 1657. The total was never less than £90,000 a year. In addition the country contributed about £35,000 in excise a year. Despite this, there was an annual deficit of £130,000, which was covered by English revenues.

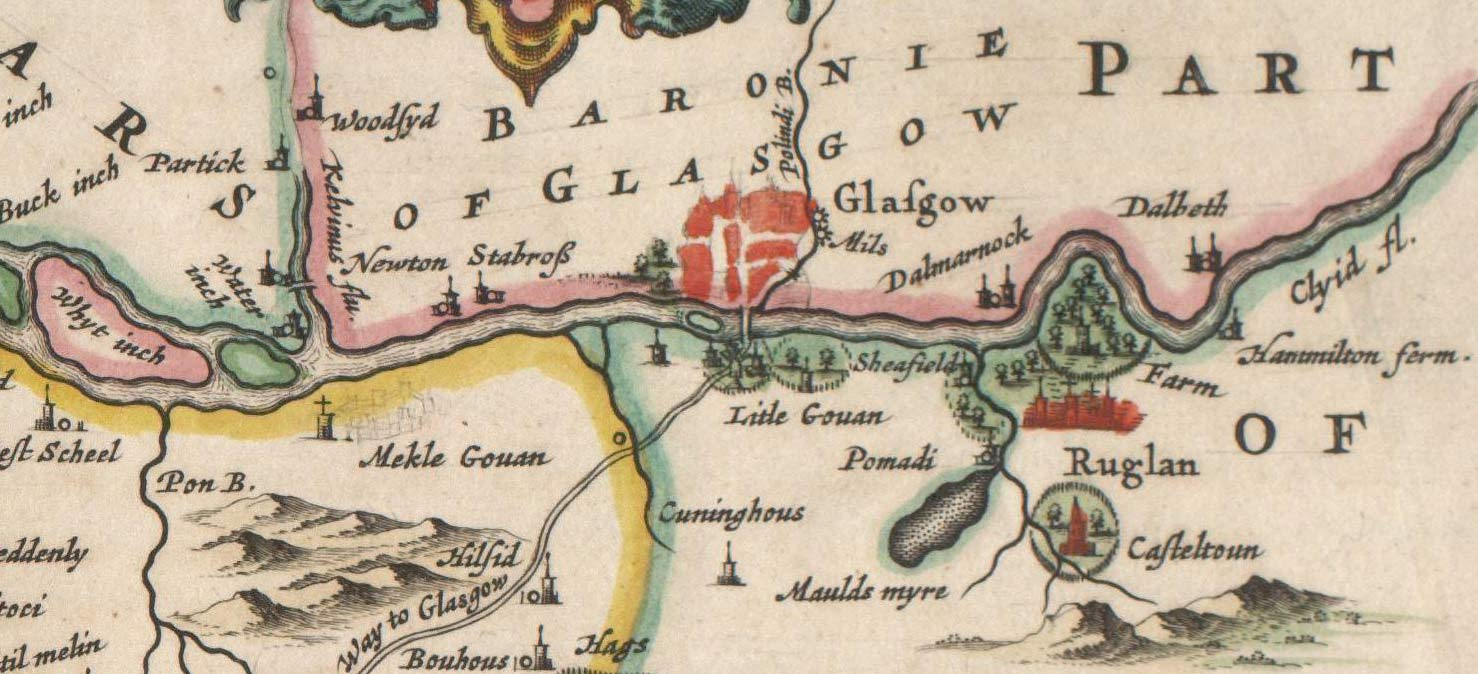
Detail of Glasgow and its surroundings from Joan Blaeu's Atlas of Scotland, 1654

Scotland had suffered considerable economic disruption during the period of the civil wars, caused by loss of manpower to a dozen armies, free quarter (the billeting of troops on civilians without payment), plunder and heavy taxation. A number of merchants, particularly moneylenders, were ruined by the wars. The east-coast towns had probably lost about one fifth of their population from the outbreak of bubonic plague that occurred in 1645. This was slow to recover and in 1651 rents in Edinburgh had to be reduced by a third. The free trade that was the major economic incentive of the union was not all beneficial, as Scotland now had to compete with the more highly developed English merchant fleet. The economy began to revive after 1650, but the prosperity was not spread evenly across the country. While Glasgow and Aberdeen prospered, Dundee and the Fife ports continued to decline. The financing of military building and the spending of wages by so many soldiers did benefit some. New industries included glass production at Leith and Cromwell's troops are traditionally credited with bringing north both the knitting of socks and the planting of kale. The good order imposed by the armed presence encouraged trade and manufacture. Alexander Burnet, later Archbishop of St. Andrews, commented that, "we always reckoned those eight years of usurpation a time of great peace and prosperity".

== Symbols ==
The Union Flag used in the period 1658–1660

The creation of the union led to revival of the Union Flag sponsored by James VI and I, which had fallen into disuse after his death in 1625. From 1654 it was used in the form of quarters, with 1st and 4th England, 2nd Scotland and an Irish harp as 3rd. Perhaps because this too clearly suggested the incorporation at the heart of the union, in 1658 it was replaced by the 1606 version of the flag favoured by James VI, with the crosses of St George and St Andrews melded and the Irish harp placed inescutcheon in the centre. The unite coin, originally struck under James VI, revived in the reign of Charles I and used by both sides in the Civil War, was again revived and struck between 1649 and 1660. It bore the English text "The Commonwealth of England" and displayed only the Cross of St George and an Irish harp. A twenty-shilling piece and a fifty-shilling piece were also issued, with the image of the Lord Protector on one side, and the crosses of St. George and St. Andrew and Irish harp quartered on the other, as in the Union Flag. Despite these attempts to produce an iconography of union, Michael Lynch argues that the commonwealth largely lacked the symbols through which consent to a nation state could be expressed.

== Fall of the regime ==
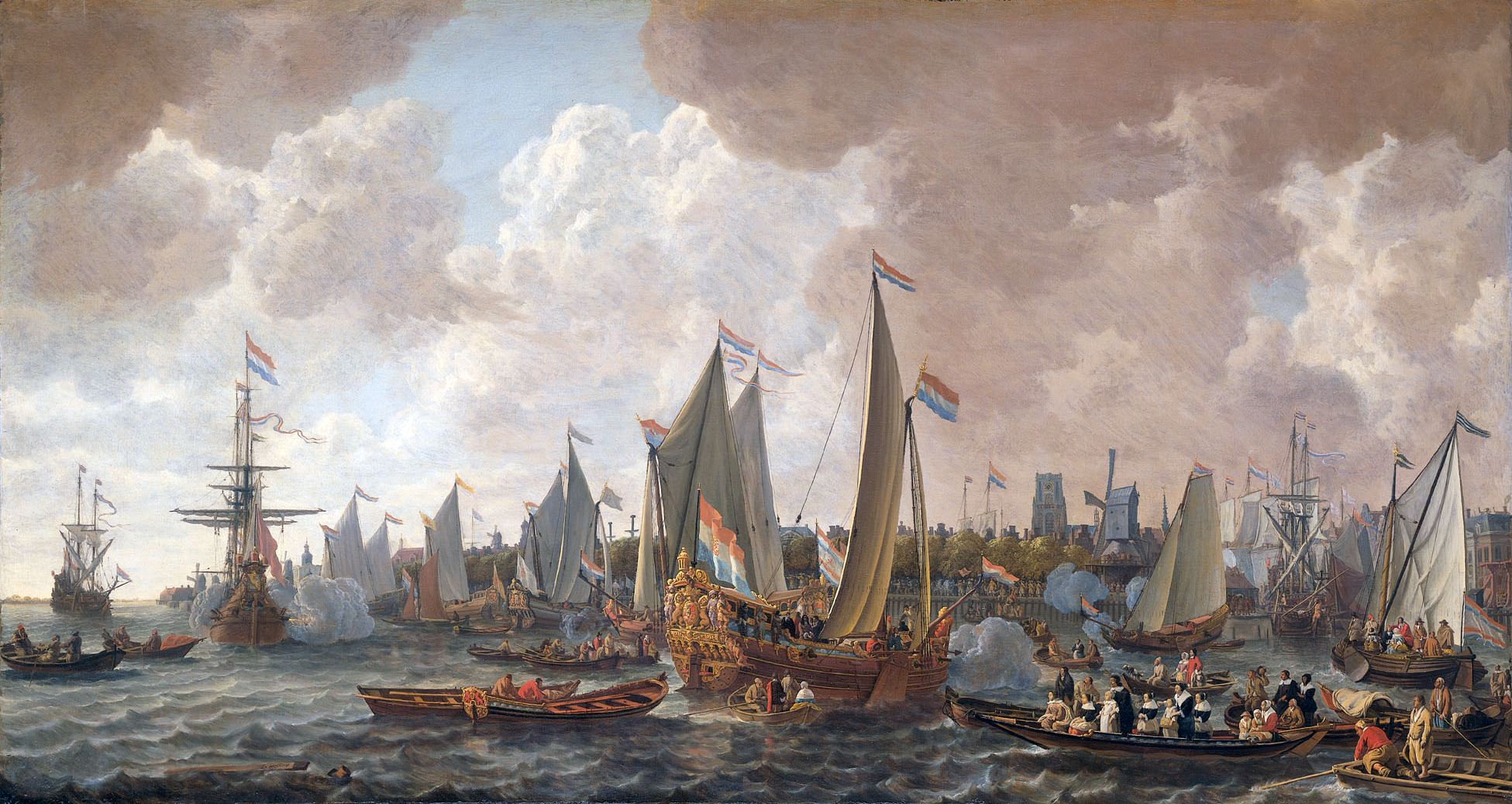
Charles sailed from his exile in the Netherlands to his restoration in England in May 1660. Painting by Lieve Verschuier

After the death of Cromwell in 1658, Monck remained aloof from the political manoeuvring in London that led to the brief establishment of a regime under the protector's son Richard Cromwell and after its fall the subsequent contest for power between the army leaders. When this proved incapable of producing a stable government in 1659 Monck opened negotiations with Charles II and began a slow march south with his army. After reaching London he restored the English Long Parliament that had existed at the beginning of the civil wars. This body, having received some assurances from Charles II, voted for a restoration of the monarchy in England and then dissolved itself. This created a de facto restoration of the monarchy in Scotland, but without any safeguards as to the constitutional position in the country. Scottish notables were in a weak position in negotiations with the crown as to what the settlement would be.

In the event Scotland regained its independent system of law, its parliament and its kirk, but also the Lords of the Articles (through which the crown controlled parliamentary business) and bishops. It also had a king who did not visit the country and ruled largely without reference to Parliament through a series of commissioners. These began with Middleton, now an earl, and ended with the king's brother and heir, James, Duke of York (known in Scotland as the Duke of Albany). Legislation was revoked back to 1633, by the Rescissory Act 1661, removing the Covenanter gains of the Bishops' Wars, but the discipline of kirk sessions, presbyteries and synods were renewed. Only four Covenanters were excluded from the general pardon and were executed, the most prominent being the Marquis of Argyll, but also including the Protester James Guthrie.
