= James Braidwood (disambiguation) =

James Braidwood may refer to:

- James Braidwood (1800–1861), Scottish firefighter, developed the modern fire service
- James Braidwood (engineer) (1832–1879), Scottish-born US mining engineer and industrialist, namesake of Braidwood, Illinois
- James Braidwood, prisoner on the St. Michael of Scarborough
