= John Cumin =

John Cumin may refer to:

- John Cumin, prisoner on the St. Michael of Scarborough
- John Comyn (bishop) or John Cumin
