= Chronology of the Wars of the Three Kingdoms =

The Chronology of the Wars of the Three Kingdoms lists major events that occurred during the Wars of the Three Kingdoms. The presentation of the data in a table format allows interested parties to copy and transfer the data to other software or databases with discrete data fields.

== Scope of historical coverage ==
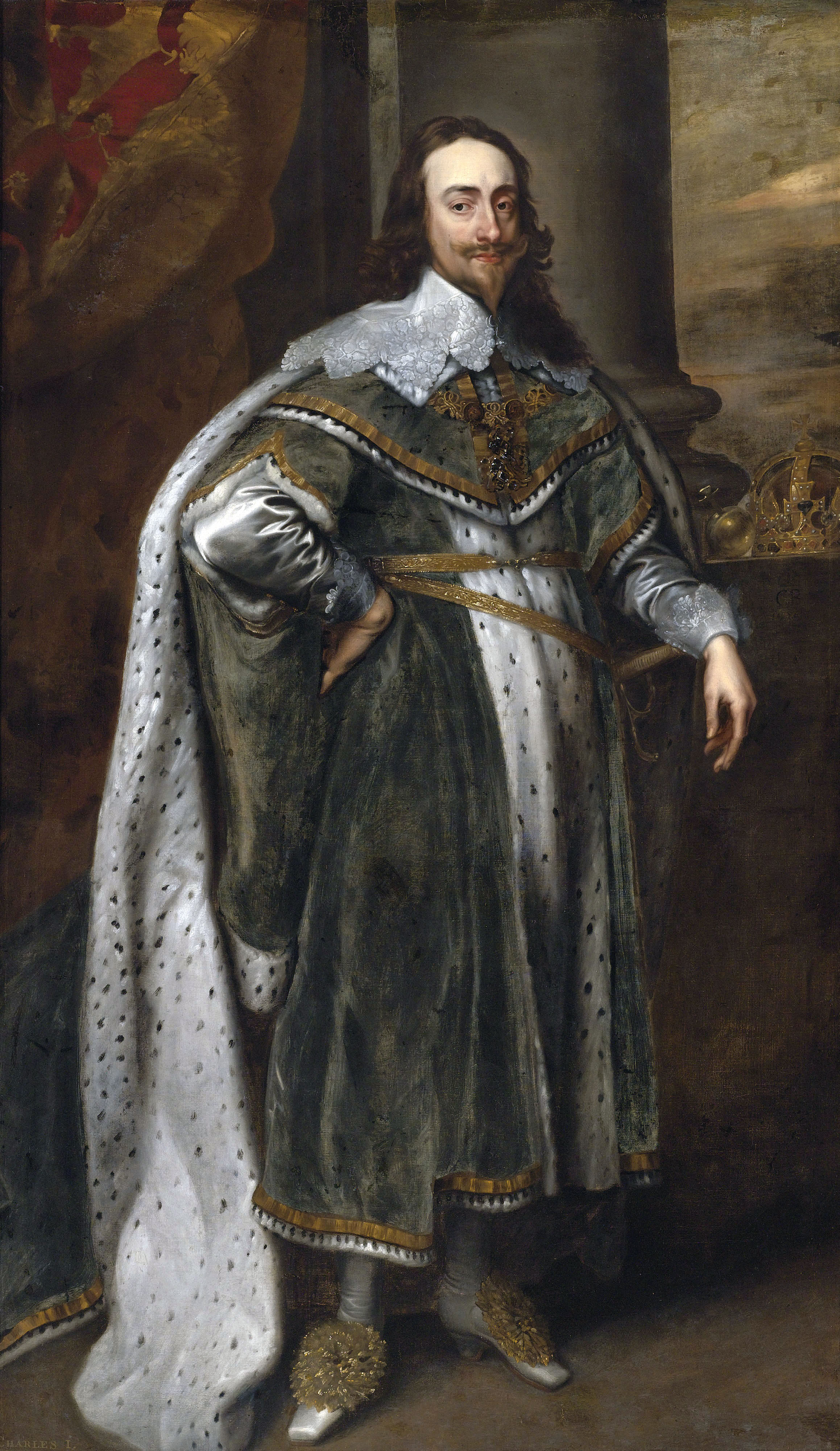
Portrait of King Charles I Anthony van Dyck, c. 1636

Included as components of the Wars of the Three Kingdoms are:

- Bishops' Wars
- The Irish Rebellion of 1641
- The Irish Confederate Wars
- The First English Civil War
- The Second English Civil War
- The 1650–1652 Anglo-Scottish war
- Scotland's participation in the Wars of the Three Kingdoms
- The Cromwellian Conquest of Ireland
- Glencairn's Rising in Scotland

== Data fields included ==
Data fields include:

- Event - This field includes a short commentary on individual battles, sieges, along with other significant events that provide context to the overall history.
- Start Date - These fields provide the most commonly accepted date (month, day, and year) on which the event began or occurred.
- End Date - These fields provide the most commonly accepted date (month, day, and year) on which the event ended.
- Event Location - This field provides the location of the battles and sieges discussed as events.
- Associated Wars - These fields provide the name(s) of the war(s) associated with the individual events.

== Notes regarding the data fields ==
=== Dates ===
With respect to the dates provided for the individual events, portions of some dates have been estimated based upon imprecise historical dating (e.g. spring, summer, fall, winter, early in the month, the middle of the month, etc.). In these cases, the dates are shown in red font.

Many of the dates were taken from Wikipedia articles. As of publication of this article in September 2020, the dates of the events in the table are fully consistent with Wikipedia articles associated with the Wars of the Three Kingdoms.

=== Event locations ===
Some locations were the site of multiple events during the War of the Three Kingdoms. In those cases a numerical count is provided after the name of the location (e.g. Oxford 1st, Oxford 2nd, etc.). If a location was the site of a single event, no numerical count will be shown. A siege of a location is only counted once and will include appropriate notations (e.g. Siege Starts, Siege Continues, and Siege Ends).

=== Associated wars ===
In some cases, an event is associated with multiple wars. In those cases, two fields (Primary and Secondary) will be populated.

== Database ==
Chronology of the Wars of the Three Kingdoms - 1639-1654
Event	Start Date			End Date			Event Location	Associated Wars	
Event	Mo.	Day	Year	Mo.	Day	Year	Event Location	Primary	Secondary
The Scottish Covenanters defeat the Royalists at Brig of Dee, Aberdeen	06	18	1639				Aberdeen 1st (Brig of Dee)	Bishops' Wars	
The Scottish Covenanters defeat King Charles I at Newburn	08	28	1640				Newburn	Bishops' Wars	
King Charles I signs the Treaty of London ending Bishops' Wars	08	10	1641					Bishops' Wars	
King Charles' weakness in Bishops' Wars emboldens Catholics who wanted reform of the Kingdom of Ireland	08		1641					Irish Rebellion	
The Irish Rebellion begins with an attempted coup d'état by a small group of Irish Catholic landowners	08		1641					Irish Rebellion	
They planned to seize Dublin Castle and other strongpoints around the country and then to issue demands	08		1641					Irish Rebellion	
Their demands included:	08		1641					Irish Rebellion	
– The free practice of the Catholic religion	08		1641					Irish Rebellion	
– Equal rights for Catholics to hold public office	08		1641					Irish Rebellion	
– An end to land confiscations	08		1641					Irish Rebellion	
The following events mark the beginning of the Irish Rebellion:	10	22	1641					Irish Rebellion	
– On October 22, 1641, Irish rebels surprise and capture six English forts in Ulster	10	22	1641				Six Forts in Ulster	Irish Rebellion	
– Felim O'Neill captures Charlemont Fort from the English	10	22	1641				Charlemont 1st	Irish Rebellion	
– Irish rebels attempt to seize Dublin Castle fails	10	22	1641				Dublin 1st	Irish Rebellion	
– O'Byrne, O'Toole and Kavanagh clans occupy Wicklow Castle	10		1641				Wicklow Castle (Siege Starts)	Irish Rebellion	
– The insurrection spreads to the general populace and attacks on Protestants grow from beatings to murders	10		1641					Irish Rebellion	
– Irish rebels advance toward Belfast	10		1641					Irish Rebellion	
– Irish rebels capture Armagh and Lurgan	10		1641				Armagh	Irish Rebellion	
– Irish rebels are driven back from Belfast by the Protestants	10		1641				Belfast 1st	Irish Rebellion	
– Protestants take refuge in Derry	10		1641					Irish Rebellion	
– Irish rebels massacre Protestant settlers at Portadown	11		1641				Portadown	Irish Rebellion	
Felim O'Neill sieges Drogheda	11		1641	03	10	1642	Drogheda 1st (Siege Starts)	Irish Rebellion	
Ormond is appointed Lieutenant-General in Ireland by King Charles	11	11	1641					Irish Rebellion	
Felim O'Neill fails to capture Lisburn	11	28	1641				Lisburn	Irish Rebellion	
Irish rebels ambush a Royalist relief contingent at Julianstown	11	29	1641				Julianstown	Irish Rebellion	
Sir Charles Coote, 1st Baronet, takes Wicklow Castle from Irish rebels	11	29	1641				Wicklow Castle (Siege Ends)	Irish Rebellion	
Sir Charles Coote, 1st Baronet, defeats the rebels at Kilcoole	12	01	1641				Kilcoole	Irish Rebellion	
Irish rebels massacre the Scottish settler garrison at Augher	12		1641				Augher	Irish Rebellion	
Felim O'Neill fails to capture Castle Derg	12		1641				Castle Derg	Irish Rebellion	
The first English reinforcements arrive in Dublin; these are sent by Parliament	12	30	1641					Irish Rebellion	
Irish rebels unsuccessfully attack a Royalist escort at Barnesmore Gap	01	01	1642				Barnesmore Gap	Irish Rebellion	
Sir Charles Coote, 1st Baronet, and the English defeat rebels at Swords near Dublin	01	11	1642				Dublin 2nd (Swords)	Irish Rebellion	
The Irish rebels siege Coleraine	01		1642	06		1642	Coleraine (Siege Starts)	Irish Rebellion	
Ormond and the English recaptures Naas from the rebels	02	03	1642				Naas	Irish Rebellion	
Irish rebels kill an English defense corps south of Coleraine at Garvagh	02	10	1642				Garvagh	Irish Rebellion	
Irish rebels unsuccessfully attack Antrim	02	13	1642				Antrim	Irish Rebellion	
Three thousand (3,000) English soldiers arrive in Dublin	03		1642					Irish Rebellion	
Irish rebels rout an English defense corps at Bundoorragh	03		1642				Bundoorragh	Irish Rebellion	
The rebel siege of Drogheda ends unsuccessfully	03	10	1642				Drogheda 1st (Siege Ends)	Irish Rebellion	
The citizens of Galway seize an English ship and declare for the rebellion	03	19	1642				Galway 1st	Irish Rebellion	
Nineteen hundred (1,900) English soldiers arrive in Dublin	03	21	1642					Irish Rebellion	
Robert Monro arrives in Ulster with an advance party of 2,500 men from Scotland	04	15	1642					Irish Rebellion	
Irish rebels unsuccessfully attempt to stop Royalist forces on a resupply mission at Kilrush	04	15	1642				Kilrush	Irish Rebellion	
The Confederate Oath of Association is drafted	05	10	1642					Irish Confederate Wars	
The Irish Confederates siege St John's Castle in Limerick	05	18	1642	06	23	1642	Limerick 1st (Siege Starts)	Irish Confederate Wars	
The Laggan Army routs Felim O'Neill at Glenmaquin	06	16	1642				Glenmaquin	Irish Confederate Wars	
The Laggan Army takes the Strabane garrison from the Confederates	06	19	1642				Strabane	Irish Confederate Wars	
St John's Castle in Limerick falls to the Confederates after siege	06	23	1642				Limerick 1st (Siege Ends)	Irish Confederate Wars	
The Laggan Army defeats Manus O'Cahan at Dungiven	06		1642				Dungiven	Irish Confederate Wars	
The Laggan Army relieves the siege of Coleraine by the Confederates	06		1642				Coleraine (Siege Ends)	Irish Confederate Wars	
Seven thousand five hundred (7,500) more Scottish veterans arrive in Ulster	07		1642					Irish Confederate Wars	
Owen Roe O'Neill returns to Ireland	07	08	1642					Irish Confederate Wars	
The Royalists siege Hull in an attempt to secure a large arsenal	07	10	1642	07	27	1642	Hull 1st (Siege Starts)	1st English; Civil War	
Lord Montgomery unsuccessfully attacks Charlemont	07		1642				Charlemont 2nd	Irish Confederate Wars	
The Royalists end the siege of Hull and retreated to York	07	27	1642				Hull 1st (Siege Ends)	1st English; Civil War	
Royalists ambush a force of Parliamentarian recruits	08	04	1642				Marshall's Elm	1st English; Civil War	
Alexander Leslie, 1st Earl of Leven, the Scottish commander arrives in Ulster	08	04	1642					Irish Confederate Wars	
Lord Forbes attacks Galway attempting to relieve the Fort-Hill garrison	08	07	1642	09	04	1642	Galway 2nd (Siege Starts)	Irish Confederate Wars	
The Parliamentarians siege Portsmouth	08	10	1642	09	07	1642	Portsmouth (Siege Starts)	1st English; Civil War	
The Royalist block land access to the Parliamentarian port of Plymouth	08		1642	01		1646	Plymouth (Siege Starts)	1st English; Civil War	
The First English Civil War starts - Charles I raises his standard at Nottingham	08	22	1642					1st English; Civil War	
Civil War in England cuts off troops, supplies, and finances for the rebellion in Ireland	08	22	1642					Irish Confederate Wars	
Laggan Army is responsible for securing the barony of Raphoe	08	22	1642				Raphoe	Irish Confederate Wars	
Owen Roe O'Neill is made general of the Confederate Army for Ulster	08	29	1642					Irish Confederate Wars	
Lord Inchiquin defeats the Confederates and secures Munster for the King	09	03	1642				Liscarroll	Irish Confederate Wars	
The Irish Confederates siege Fort-Hill garrison in Galway	09	04	1642	06	20	1643	Galway 2nd (Siege Continues)	Irish Confederate Wars	
The Parliamentarians capture Portsmouth after a siege and secure a large gunpowder reserve	09	07	1642				Portsmouth (Siege Ends)	1st English; Civil War	
The Royalists and the Parliamentarians skirmish	09	07	1642				Babylon Hill	1st English; Civil War	
General Leslie attacks Owen O'Neill at Charlemont	09		1642				Charlemont 3rd	Irish Confederate Wars	
General Leslie attacks Owen O'Neill at Charlemont	09		1642				Charlemont 4th	Irish Confederate Wars	
Prince Rupert routes the Parliamentarian cavalry and rescues Byron's convoy of silver	09	23	1642				Powick Bridge	1st English; Civil War	
Prince Rupert loses a skirmish to the Parliamentarians	10	17	1642				Kings Norton	1st English; Civil War	
King Charles attempts to gain London and is blocked by Essex and the Parliamentarians	10	23	1642				Edgehill	1st English; Civil War	
The first Confederate General Assembly is held at Kilkenny	10	24	1642					Irish Confederate Wars	
Prince Rupert loses a skirmish to the Parliamentarians	11	01	1642				Aylesbury	1st English; Civil War	
Prince Rupert defeats the Parliamentarians as King Charles advances on London	11	12	1642				Brentford	1st English; Civil War	
King Charles leads his army nearly to London then backs off when Essex and the Parliamentarians block his way	11	13	1642				Turnham Green	1st English; Civil War	
The Parliamentarians quickly capture the Farnham castle as King Charles takes his army to Oxford	12	01	1642				Farnham Castle	1st English; Civil War	
The Parliamentarians fail to stop the Earl of Newcastle from advancing to York	12	01	1642				Piercebridge	1st English; Civil War	
The Earl of Newcastle continues his advance south capturing the Parliamentarian garrison of Tadcaster	12	07	1642				Tadcaster	1st English; Civil War	
Royalists attempting to advance east out of Sussex are stopped by a disciplined Parliamentarian force	12		1642				Muster Green	1st English; Civil War	
The Parliamentarians siege a small Royalist garrison in southern England	12	22	1642	12	27	1642	Chichester (Siege Starts)	1st English; Civil War	
Cornwall Royalists make a weak and unsuccessful effort to siege Exeter	12		1642	01		1643	Exeter 1st	1st English; Civil War	
The Parliamentarians capture a small Royalist garrison in southern England	12	27	1642				Chichester (Siege Ends)	1st English; Civil War	
Royalists forces advancing east from Cornwall defeat inexperienced Parliamentarians in a short battle	01	19	1643				Braddock Down	1st English; Civil War	
The Parliamentarians attack and capture Leeds partially restoring the balance of power in northern England	01	23	1643				Leeds	1st English; Civil War	
The Confederates are defeated by Charles Coote as the Parliamentarians withdraw from Connacht to Dublin	02	05	1643				Rathconnel	Irish Confederate Wars	
Brereton and the Parliamentarians defeat the Royalists in north-west Cheshire	03	13	1643				Middlewich 1st	1st English; Civil War	
The Royalists decimate Thomas Preston and the Confederate Leinster Army at Ballinvegga	03	18	1643				New Ross 1st	Irish Confederate Wars	
The Royalists defend their supply lines clashing inconclusively with the Parliamentarians in Hopton Heath	03	19	1643				Hopton Heath	1st English; Civil War	
The Royalists decimate a Parliamentarian infantry detachment returning from a diversionary tactic	03	30	1643				Seacroft Moor	1st English; Civil War	
Prince Rupert and the Royalists torch Camp Hill / Birmingham after being fired upon by Parliamentarians	04	03	1643				Camp Hill	1st English; Civil War	
Prince Rupert and the Royalists siege a small garrison in Lichfield	04	08	1643	04	21	1643	Lichfield (Siege Starts)	1st English; Civil War	
Prince Maurice blunts the advances of Sir William Waller near the River Severn and Wales	04	13	1643				Ripple Field	1st English; Civil War	
The Parliamentarians siege a Royalist garrison	04	14	1643	04	25	1643	Reading (Siege Starts)	1st English; Civil War	
Prince Rupert and the Royalists capture a small garrison in Lichfield	04	21	1643				Lichfield (Siege Ends)	1st English; Civil War	
The Parliamentarians successfully capture a Royalist garrison	04	25	1643				Reading (Siege Ends)	1st English; Civil War	
The Parliamentarians turn the tables on a Royalist attack in Devon	04	25	1643				Sourton Down	1st English; Civil War	
The Parliamentarians siege the Castle of a prominent Royalist	05	02	1643	05	08	1643	Wardour 1st (Siege Starts)	1st English; Civil War	
Robert Monro attacks Owen O'Neill at Charlemont	05		1643				Charlemont 5th	Irish Confederate Wars	
Robert Monro attacks Owen O'Neill at Charlemont	05		1643				Charlemont 6th	Irish Confederate Wars	
The Parliamentarians successfully capture the Castle of a prominent Royalist	05	08	1643				Wardour 1st (Siege Ends)	1st English; Civil War	
Hopton and the Royalists decimate the Parliamentarians in Cornwall	05	16	1643				Stratton	1st English; Civil War	
Thomas Fairfax and the Parliamentarians attack the Royalist garrison and take prisoners for a Seacroft Moor exchange	05	21	1643				Wakefield	1st English; Civil War	
Waller and the Parliamentarians siege Worcester	05	29	1643	05	31	1643	Worcester 1st (Siege Starts)	1st English; Civil War	
Waller and the Parliamentarians end the siege Worcester and quickly retreat	05	31	1643				Worcester 1st (Siege Ends)	1st English; Civil War	
The Irish Confederate cavalry defeats a retreating Royalist infantry force at Cloughleagh	06	04	1643				Cloghleagh	Irish Confederate Wars	
Robert Stewart and the Laggan Army routs Owen Roe O'Neill at Clones, County Monaghan	06	13	1643				Clones	Irish Confederate Wars	
John Hampden and the Parliamentarians are defeated when they pursue a Prince Rupert raiding party	06	18	1643				Chalgrove Field	1st English; Civil War	
The Irish Confederates capture Fort-Hill garrison in Galway	06	20	1643				Galway 2nd (Siege Ends)	Irish Confederate Wars	
The Earl of Newcastle and the Royalists defeat the Fairfax Parliamentarians in West Yorkshire	06	30	1643				Adwalton Moor	1st English; Civil War	
Queen Henrietta Maria's escort captures a bridge from the Parliamentarians in advance of her supply convoy	07	04	1643				Burton Bridge	1st English; Civil War	
Hopton and the Royalists defeat the Parliamentarians as they advance east out of Devonshire	07	05	1643				Lansdowne	1st English; Civil War	
Lord Wilmot's cavalry routes Waller and his army of 5,000 Parliamentarians	07	13	1643				Roundway Down	1st English; Civil War	
The victory of the Royalists at Roundway Down effectively isolates the Parliamentarian garrison of Exeter in Devon	07	13	1643	09	04	1643	Exeter 2nd (Siege Starts)	1st English; Civil War	
Charles Cavendish and the Royalists siege Gainsborough in Lincolnshire	07	15	1643	07	28	1643	Gainsborough (Siege Starts)	1st English; Civil War	
Prince Rupert and the Royalists storm and capture the port city of Bristol	07	26	1643				Bristol 1st	1st English; Civil War	
Cromwell defeats Cavendish at the siege of Gainsborough in Lincolnshire	07	28	1643				Gainsborough (Siege Ends)	1st English; Civil War	
Owen Roe O'Neill defeats Charles Moore at Portlester	08	07	1643				Portlester	Irish Confederate Wars	
King Charles sieges Gloucester in the South-west	08	10	1643	09	05	1643	Gloucester (Siege Starts)	1st English; Civil War	
The Earl of Newcastle sieges Hull	09	02	1643	10	12	1643	Hull 2nd (Siege Starts)	1st English; Civil War	
Exeter surrenders to Prince Maurice and the Royalists	09	04	1643				Exeter 2nd (Siege Ends)	1st English; Civil War	
King Charles ends the siege Gloucester in the South-west	09	05	1643				Gloucester (Siege Ends)	1st English; Civil War	
The Royalists and the Confederates agree to a ceasefire - The Cessation of Arms	09	15	1643					Irish Confederate Wars	
Prince Rupert attacks the Earl of Essex as he returns to London from relieving Gloucester	09	18	1643				Aldbourne Chase	1st English; Civil War	
King Charles unsuccessfully attempts to stop the Earl of Essex's army from reaching London	09	20	1643				Newbury 1st	1st English; Civil War	
The Solemn League and Covenant is signed by Parliament	09	25	1643					1st English; Civil War	
The Laggan Army "refuses" the Covenant and the Cessation of Arms	09		1643					Irish Confederate Wars	
The Earl of Manchester defeats a relieving force near Bolingbroke Castle in Lincolnshire	10	11	1643				Winceby	1st English; Civil War	
The Earl of Newcastle ends the siege of Hull	10	12	1643				Hull 2nd (Siege Ends)	1st English; Civil War	
A Parliamentarian garrison stops Prince Rupert in a skirmish at a bridge in Olney	11	04	1643				Olney	1st English; Civil War	
Waller and the Parliamentarians siege Basing House	11	06	1643	11	15	1643	Basing House 1st (Siege Starts)	1st English; Civil War	
The Royalists fail to capture Heptonstall in Yorkshire	11		1643				Heptonstall	1st English; Civil War	
The Royalists siege Wardour Castle	11		1643	03		1644	Wardour 2nd (Siege Starts)	1st English; Civil War	
Waller and the Parliamentarians end the siege of Basing House when the troops revolt	11	15	1643				Basing House 1st (Siege Ends)	1st English; Civil War	
A Royalist detachment fails to capture a bridge over the River Adur in West Sussex	12	13	1643				Bramber Bridge	1st English; Civil War	
The Parliamentarians execute a surprise attack on the Royalist winter garrison in Hampshire	12	13	1643				Alton	1st English; Civil War	
The Ordinance to enact the Cessation of Arms is approved	12	15	1643					Irish Confederate Wars	
The Parliamentarians siege Arundel Castle	12	19	1643	01	06	1644	Arundel (Siege Starts)	1st English; Civil War	
The Royalists defeat Brereton and the Parliamentarians in a battle for Cheshire	12	26	1643				Middlewich 2nd	1st English; Civil War	
The Royalists surrender Arundel Castle after an eighteen day siege	01	06	1644				Arundel (Siege Ends)	1st English; Civil War	
Sir Thomas Fairfax in command of a Parliamentarian relief force defeats Lord Byron and the Royalists	01	25	1644				Nantwich	1st English; Civil War	
The Royalist garrison of Newark is sieged by the Parliamentarians	02		1644	03	21	1644	Newark 1st (Siege Starts)	1st English; Civil War	
Scot Covenanters conduct a prolonged siege of Newcastle	02	03	1644	10	27	1644	Newcastle 1st (Siege Starts)	1st English; Civil War	Scotland in the Wars of Three Kingdoms
The Parliamentarians siege Lathom House in Lancashire	02	27	1644	05	27	1644	Lathom House 1st (Siege Starts)	1st English; Civil War	
The Royalists capture Wardour Castle	03		1644				Wardour 2nd (Siege Ends)	1st English; Civil War	
Parliament appoints Major-General Robert Monro commander-in-chief of its forces in Ireland	03	09	1644					Irish Confederate Wars	
Prince Rupert and the Royalists relieve the siege of their Newark garrison	03	21	1644				Newark 1st (Siege Ends)	1st English; Civil War	
The Scot Covenanters and the Royalists face-off inconclusively near Newcastle	03	24	1644				Boldon Hill	1st English; Civil War	Scotland in the Wars of Three Kingdoms
A Parliamentarian relief force is defeated and turned back at Stourbridge	03	26	1644				Stourbridge Heath	1st English; Civil War	
The Royalists fail to stop the westward expansion of the Parliamentarians into Hampshire	03	29	1644				Cheriton	1st English; Civil War	
The Fairfaxes and the Parliamentarians capture the strategic garrison of Selby in Yorkshire	04	11	1644				Selby	1st English; Civil War	
The Royalists siege the port city of Lyme Regis	04	20	1644	06	16	1644	Lyme Regis (Siege Starts)	1st English; Civil War	
The Parliamentarians conduct a prolonged siege of York	04	22	1644	07	16	1644	York (Siege Starts)	1st English; Civil War	Scotland in the Wars of Three Kingdoms
The Parliamentarians siege the city of Lincoln in Lincolnshire	05	03	1644	05	06	1644	Lincoln (Siege Starts)	1st English; Civil War	
The Parliamentarians capture the city of Lincoln in Lincolnshire	05	06	1644				Lincoln (Siege Ends)	1st English; Civil War	
Robert Munro and the Parliamentarians seize Belfast	05	14	1644				Belfast 2nd	Irish Confederate Wars	
The Parliamentarians end the siege of Lathom House in Lancashire	05	27	1644				Lathom House 1st (Siege Ends)	1st English; Civil War	
The Parliamentarians siege Oxford in an attempt to capture King Charles	05	27	1644	06	04	1644	Oxford 1st (Siege Starts)	1st English; Civil War	
Prince Rupert attacks the city of Bolton and allegedly slaughters defenders and inhabitants	05	28	1644				Bolton	1st English; Civil War	
The Parliamentarians siege Basing House for a second time	06	04	1644	11	15	1644	Basing House 2nd (Siege Starts)	1st English; Civil War	
The Parliamentarians end the siege of Oxford	06	04	1644				Oxford 1st (Siege Ends)	1st English; Civil War	
The Earl of Denbigh and the Parliamentarians siege Dudley Castle in the West Midlands	06	05	1644	06	12	1644	Tipton Green (Siege Starts)	1st English; Civil War	
The Royalists clash with a Parliamentarian force ending the siege of Dudley Castle in the West Midlands	06	12	1644				Tipton Green (Siege Ends)	1st English; Civil War	
The Royalists end the siege of the port city of Lyme Regis	06	16	1644				Lyme Regis (Siege Ends)	1st English; Civil War	
The Parliamentarians capture the Oswestry garrison in Shropshire	06	22	1644				Oswestry	1st English; Civil War	
Sir William Waller and the Parliamentarian army fail to capture King Charles	06	29	1644				Cropredy Bridge	1st English; Civil War	
The Parliamentarians defeat the Royalists decisively killing 4,000 and taking 1,500 prisoners	07	02	1644				Marston Moor	1st English; Civil War	Scotland in the Wars of Three Kingdoms
The Royalists surrender York after the defeat at Marston Moor	07	16	1644				York (Siege Ends)	1st English; Civil War	Scotland in the Wars of Three Kingdoms
Inchiquin abandons the Royalist cause and declares for Parliament	07	17	1644					Irish Confederate Wars	
Standoff between Monro's Parliamentarians and the Confederates of Owen O'Neill and the Earl of Castlehaven	07		1644				County Meath	Irish Confederate Wars	
The Parliamentarians track and defeat the Royalists on a recruitment trip in Lancashire	08	20	1644				Ormskirk	1st English; Civil War	
King Charles corners and defeats the Earl of Essex and the Parliamentarians in Cornwall	08	21	1644				Lostwithiel	1st English; Civil War	
Scottish Royalists attempting to start a revolution defeat a Scot government force	09	01	1644				Tippermuir	1st English; Civil War	Scotland in the Wars of Three Kingdoms
Lord Byron and the Royalists siege Montgomery Castle in Wales	09	08	1644	09	18	1644	Montgomery (Siege Starts)	1st English; Civil War	
Scottish Royalists defeat a Scot government force and sack Aberdeen; the city is abandoned to the Covenanters	09	13	1644				Aberdeen 2nd	1st English; Civil War	Scotland in the Wars of Three Kingdoms
The Parliamentarians defeat Lord Byron and break the siege of Montgomery Castle in Wales	09	18	1644				Montgomery (Siege Ends)	1st English; Civil War	
The Parliamentarians begin a prolonged siege of Chester in Cheshire	09	20	1644	02	03	1646	Chester (Siege Starts)	1st English; Civil War	
The Royalists siege Taunton in Somerset	09	23	1644	12	14	1644	Taunton 1st (Siege Starts)	1st English; Civil War	
The Parliamentarians siege Carlisle in Cumbria	10		1644	06	25	1645	Carlisle (Siege Starts)	1st English; Civil War	Scotland in the Wars of Three Kingdoms
The Parliamentarians successfully block King Charles from advancing on London	10	27	1644				Newbury 2nd	1st English; Civil War	
The Royalists at Newcastle accept terms after a prolonged siege by the Scot Covenanters	10	27	1644				Newcastle 1st (Siege Ends)	1st English; Civil War	Scotland in the Wars of Three Kingdoms
The Parliamentarians end the siege of Basing House for a second time	11	15	1644				Basing House 2nd (Siege Ends)	1st English; Civil War	
The Cessation of Arms is renewed	12	01	1644					Irish Confederate Wars	
Colonel Rawstorne and the Royalists surrender Lathom House in Lancashire	12	02	1644				Lathom House 2nd (Siege Ends)	1st English; Civil War	
The Royalists end the siege of Taunton in Somerset	12	14	1644				Taunton 1st (Siege Ends)	1st English; Civil War	
Inchiquin enters into a short truce with the Confederates	12		1644	04	10	1645		Irish Confederate Wars	
The Parliamentarians siege Newark	01		1645	02		1645	Newark 2nd (Siege Starts)	1st English; Civil War	
Scottish Royalists defeat a Scot government force at Inverlochy	02	02	1645				Inverlochy	1st English; Civil War	Scotland in the Wars of Three Kingdoms
The Parliamentarians end the siege of Newark	02		1645				Newark 2nd (Siege Ends)	1st English; Civil War	
The Parliamentarians begin a prolonged siege of a Royalist manor	02		1645	03	28	1646	High Ercall Hall (Siege Starts)	1st English; Civil War	
The Royalists capture the port of Weymouth in Dorset	02	09	1645				Weymouth 1st	1st English; Civil War	
The Parliamentarians siege Scarborough Castle in Yorkshire	02	18	1645	07	25	1645	Scarborough Castle (Siege Starts)	1st English; Civil War	
The Parliamentarians recapture Weymouth in Dorset	02	27	1645				Weymouth 2nd	1st English; Civil War	
The Royalists siege Taunton in Somerset for the second time	03	11	1645	05	10	1645	Taunton 2nd (Siege Starts)	1st English; Civil War	
Thomas Preston and the Irish Confederates capture Duncannon from English Parliamentarians	03	18	1645				Duncannon	Irish Confederate Wars	
The truce between Inchiquin and the Confederates ends	04	10	1645					Irish Confederate Wars	
Scottish Royalists defeat a Scot government force in the highlands	05	09	1645				Auldearn	1st English; Civil War	Scotland in the Wars of Three Kingdoms
The Royalists end the second siege of Taunton in Somerset	05	10	1645				Taunton 2nd (Siege Ends)	1st English; Civil War	
The Royalists siege Taunton in Somerset for the third time	05	12	1645	07	09	1645	Taunton 3rd (Siege Starts)	1st English; Civil War	
The Parliamentarians siege Oxford in an attempt to capture King Charles	05	22	1645	06	05	1645	Oxford 2nd (Siege Starts)	1st English; Civil War	
King Charles captures Leicester but incurs heavy losses	05	30	1645				Leicester	1st English; Civil War	
The Parliamentarians end the siege of Oxford	06	05	1645				Oxford 2nd (Siege Ends)	1st English; Civil War	
Sir Fairfax, Oliver Cromwell and the Parliamentarians decimate King Charles and the Royalists	06	14	1645				Naseby	1st English; Civil War	
The Parliamentarians capture Carlisle in Cumbria after a siege	06	25	1645				Carlisle (Siege Ends)	1st English; Civil War	Scotland in the Wars of Three Kingdoms
Scottish Royalists defeat pursuing Scot government forces	07	02	1645				Alford	1st English; Civil War	Scotland in the Wars of Three Kingdoms
The Parliamentarians siege Lathom House in Lancashire	07		1645	12	02	1645	Lathom House 2nd (Siege Starts)	1st English; Civil War	
The Parliamentarians and Laggan Army led by Charles Coote capture Sligo	07	08	1645				Sligo 1st	Irish Confederate Wars	
The Royalists end the third siege of Taunton in Somerset	07	09	1645				Taunton 3rd (Siege Ends)	1st English; Civil War	
Sir Fairfax, Oliver Cromwell, and the Parliamentarians defeat the Royalist army in the West	07	10	1645				Langport	1st English; Civil War	
The Parliamentarians capture Scarborough Castle in Yorkshire	07	25	1645				Scarborough Castle (Siege Ends)	1st English; Civil War	
Scottish Royalists defeat a Scot government force led by William Baillie	08	15	1645				Kilsyth	1st English; Civil War	Scotland in the Wars of Three Kingdoms
Prince Rupert surrenders the important city and port of Bristol to the Parliamentarians	08	23	1645	09	10	1645	Bristol 2nd	1st English; Civil War	
Sir David Leslie and the Covenanters defeat the Scottish Royalists	09	13	1645				Philiphaugh	1st English; Civil War	Scotland in the Wars of Three Kingdoms
King Charles' cavalry gets surrounded and defeated while attempting to end the siege of Chester in Cheshire	09	24	1645				Rowton Heath	1st English; Civil War	
Papal Nuncio Rinuccini arrives at Kenmare	10	11	1645					Irish Confederate Wars	
Cromwell attacks, loots and burns down Basing House slaughtering the defenders	10	12	1645	10	14	1645	Basing House 3rd	1st English; Civil War	
The Irish Connaught Army fails to capture Sligo from the Parliamentarians; the Archbishop of Tuam is killed	10	17	1645					Irish Confederate Wars	
The Parliamentarians quash a Royalist effort to relieve Chester	11	01	1645				Denbigh Green	1st English; Civil War	
The Parliamentarians siege Newark	11		1645	05		1646	Newark 3rd (Siege Starts)	1st English; Civil War	
Plymouth is no longer blockaded as the war ends	01		1646				Plymouth (Siege Ends)	1st English; Civil War	
The Parliamentarians and Cromwell conduct a preemptive attack on the Royalists in Devon	01	09	1646				Bovey Heath	1st English; Civil War	
The Parliamentarians capture Chester in Cheshire after a 16 month siege	02	03	1646				Chester (Siege Ends)	1st English; Civil War	
The Parliamentarians confront and defeat Royalists in Devon	02	16	1646				Torrington	1st English; Civil War	
The Parliamentarians intercept and defeat Royalist recruits on their way to Oxford	03	21	1646				Stow-on-the-Wold	1st English; Civil War	
The Confederate Supreme Council signs a peace treaty (First Ormond Peace Treaty) with Ormond and the Royalists	03	28	1646					Irish Confederate Wars	
The Parliamentarians capture a fortified manor after a long siege	03	28	1646				High Ercall Hall (Siege Ends)	1st English; Civil War	
The Parliamentarians siege Oxford	05	01	1646	06	25	1646	Oxford 3rd (Siege Starts)	1st English; Civil War	
King Charles orders the town to surrender when the war ends	05		1646				Newark 3rd (Siege Ends)	1st English; Civil War	
Charles I surrenders to the Scottish Army - The First English Civil War ends	05	05	1646					1st English; Civil War	
The Marquis of Huntly captures Aberdeen from the Covenanters for King Charles	05	14	1646				Aberdeen 3rd	1st English; Civil War	Scotland in the Wars of Three Kingdoms
Alasdair Mac Colla leads Clan Campbell in a victory over Clan MacDonald	05		1646				Lagganmore	1st English; Civil War	Scotland in the Wars of Three Kingdoms
The Parliamentarians siege Worcester	05	21	1646	07	23	1646	Worcester 2nd (Siege Starts)	1st English; Civil War	
Owen O'Neill defeats Robert Munro's Parliamentarian forces	06	05	1646				Benburb	Irish Confederate Wars	
The Parliamentarians take possession of Oxford	06	25	1646				Oxford 3rd (Siege Ends)	1st English; Civil War	
General Preston and the Confederates defeat the Parliamentarians and captures Roscommon Castle	07	10	1646				Roscommon Castle	Irish Confederate Wars	
General Preston and the Confederates defeats the Parliamentarians and captures Bunratty Castle	07	12	1646				Bunratty Castle	Irish Confederate Wars	
The Parliamentarians take possession of Worcester	07	23	1646				Worcester 2nd (Siege Ends)	1st English; Civil War	
The Ormond Peace is proclaimed in Dublin	07	30	1646					Irish Confederate Wars	
Archbishop Rinuccini denounces the Ormond Peace	08	12	1646					Irish Confederate Wars	
Rinuccini pronounces a sentence of excommunication on all those who support the Ormond Peace	09	02	1646					Irish Confederate Wars	
Rinuccini and the Confederate military ousts the Confederate Supreme Council	09	15	1646					Irish Confederate Wars	
Rinuccini and the Catholic clergy appoint a new Supreme Council at Kilkenny	09	26	1646					Irish Confederate Wars	
Owen O'Neill and Thomas Preston siege Royalist Dublin under the command of Ormond	09	27	1646	11	15	1646	Dublin 3rd (Siege Starts)	Irish Confederate Wars	
The Confederate siege of Dublin under the command of Ormond and the Royalists ends	11	15	1646				Dublin 3rd (Siege Ends)	Irish Confederate Wars	
Parliament enacts an ordinance to void the Cessation of Arms	12	14	1646					Irish Confederate Wars	
Sir David Leslie and the Covenanters hunt down and defeat Alasdair Mac Colla	05	24	1647				Rhunahaorine Moss	1st English; Civil War	Scotland in the Wars of Three Kingdoms
Sir David Leslie and the Covenanters attack then slaughter 300 MacDougall Highlanders	06		1647				Dunaverty	1st English; Civil War	Scotland in the Wars of Three Kingdoms
Ormond hands Dublin over to Michael Jones and the Parliament Army	07	28	1647				Dublin 4th	Irish Confederate Wars	
Parliamentarians decimate Thomas Preston's Confederate Leinster army in the field	08	08	1647				Dungan's Hill	Irish Confederate Wars	
Inchiquin captures and then sacks the Confederates at the Rock of Cashel	09	15	1647				Cashel	Irish Confederate Wars	
The Laggan Army refuses to muster to support Coote in an offensive against the Confederates in Connacht	11		1647					Irish Confederate Wars	
Inchiquin decimates the Confederate forces commanded by Viscount Taaffe at Knocknanuss	11	13	1647				Knocknanuss	Irish Confederate Wars	
Charles I signs the Engagement Agreement with the Scots	12	26	1647					Irish Confederate Wars	
Inchiquin declares for King Charles and joins the Royalist efforts	04	03	1648					Irish Confederate Wars	
The Parliamentarians put down a revolt of former soldiers	05	08	1648				St. Fagans	2nd English; Civil War	
The Confederate Council signs the Treaty of Dungarvan with Inchiquin	05	20	1648					Irish Confederate Wars	
Oliver Cromwell sieges rebellious Parliamentarian soldiers at Pembroke Castle in Wales	05	31	1648	07	11	1648	Pembroke (Siege Starts)	2nd English; Civil War	
Sir Thomas Fairfax puts down a Royalist partisan revolt in Kent	06	01	1648				Maidstone	2nd English; Civil War	
Colonel George Twisleton and the Parliamentarians put down a Royalist revolt in North Wales	06	05	1648				Y Dalar Hir	2nd English; Civil War	
Owen O'Neill declares war on the Confederate Council and leads an army against Kilkenny	06	11	1648					Irish Confederate Wars	
Royalists partisans take refuge in Colchester; Parliamentarians siege the town	06	12	1648	08	28	1648	Colchester (Siege Starts)	2nd English; Civil War	
The Engagers and the Kirk Party fight an inconclusive battle in Scotland	06	12	1648				Mauchline Muir	Scotland - Civil Issues	
Owen O'Neill pillages Leinster and harasses the Confederates and Protestants	06		1648	09		1648		Irish Confederate Wars	
Oliver Cromwell successfully captures rebellious Parliamentarian soldiers at Pembroke Castle in Wales	07	11	1648				Pembroke (Siege Ends)	2nd English; Civil War	
The Parliamentarians defeat the Scottish "Engagers" at Preston in England	08	17	1648	08	19	1648	Preston	2nd English; Civil War	Scotland in the Wars of Three Kingdoms
The Parliamentarians move to eliminate any with Royalists leanings in Ireland	08		1648					Irish Confederate Wars	
Royalists partisans surrender Colchester to the Parliamentarians after the defeat of the Royalists at Preston	08	28	1648				Colchester (Siege Ends)	2nd English; Civil War	
The pillage of Leinster by Owen O'Neill ends	09		1648					Irish Confederate Wars	
Supporters of the Kirk Party march on Edinburgh and capture the city	09		1648				Whiggamore Raid	Scotland - Civil Issues	
The Engagers defeat the Kirk Party at a battle in Scotland	09	12	1648				Stirling	Scotland - Civil Issues	
Monck commands a Parliamentarian Army and takes Belfast from the Royalists	09		1648				Belfast 3rd	Irish Confederate Wars	
Monck commands a Parliamentarian Army and takes Carrickfergus from the Royalists	09		1648				Carrickfergus 1st	Irish Confederate Wars	
Coote and the Parliamentarians take Ferry from the Laggan Army	12		1648				Ferry 1st	Irish Confederate Wars	
Ormond and the Royalists ally with Inchiquin and the Confederate Council against the Parliamentarians	01	17	1649					Irish Confederate Wars	
King Charles I is executed	01	30	1649					2nd English; Civil War	
Royalist clans in northern Scotland occupy Inverness for a short while	02	22	1649				Inverness 1st	Scotland - Civil Issues	
Rinuccini leaves Ireland	02	23	1649					Irish Confederate Wars	
The Laggan Army sieges the Parliamentarians in Derry	03	28	1649	08	07	1649	Derry 2nd (Siege Starts)	Irish Confederate Wars	
Owen O'Neill and the Parliamentarians agree to an armistice to fight the Royalists	05		1649					Irish Confederate Wars	
England becomes a Commonwealth	05	19	1649					2nd English; Civil War	
Confederate and Irish Royalists siege Dublin held by Michael Jones and the Parliamentarians	06	19	1649	08	02	1649	Dublin 5th (Siege Starts)	Irish Confederate Wars	
The Scots join the Laggan Army and use their artillery to block resupply of Derry by mean of the River Foyle	07		1649				Derry 2nd (Siege Continues)	Irish Confederate Wars	
The Marquis of Clanricarde and the Royalists capture Sligo in Connacht	07	09	1649				Sligo 2nd	Irish Confederate Wars	
The Parliamentarians surrender Drogheda to Inchiquin and the Royalists	07	11	1649				Drogheda 2nd	Irish Confederate Wars	
The Parliamentarians surrender Dundalk to Inchiquin and the Royalists	07	24	1649				Dundalk	Irish Confederate Wars	
Confederate and Irish Royalists end the siege of Dublin when the Parliamentarians decimate Ormond at Rathmines	08	02	1649				Dublin 5th (Siege Ends)	Irish Confederate Wars	
Michael Jones and the Parliamentarians decimates Ormond and the Confederates near Dublin	08	02	1649				Dublin 6th (Rathmines)	Irish Confederate Wars	
Owen O'Neill relieves Derry from siege by the Laggan Army and the Scots	08	07	1649				Derry 2nd (Siege Ends)	Irish Confederate Wars	
Cromwell's army arrives in Dublin	08	15	1649					Cromwellian Conquest of Ireland	
Cromwell sieges Drogheda	09	03	1649	09	11	1649	Drogheda 3rd (Siege Starts)	Cromwellian Conquest of Ireland	
Cromwell captures Drogheda and gives little quarter to the inhabitants	09	11	1649				Drogheda 3rd (Siege Ends)	Cromwellian Conquest of Ireland	
The Commonwealth Army led by Venables takes Belfast from Lord Montgomery and the Royalists	10	01	1649				Belfast 4th	Cromwellian Conquest of Ireland	
Cromwell storms the port of Wexford	10	02	1649	10	11	1649	Wexford (Siege Starts)	Cromwellian Conquest of Ireland	
Cromwell captures the port of Wexford	10	11	1649				Wexford (Siege Ends)	Cromwellian Conquest of Ireland	
Cromwell captures New Ross	10	19	1649				New Ross 2nd	Cromwellian Conquest of Ireland	
Owen O'Neill agrees to join forces with Ormond against Cromwell	10	20	1649					Cromwellian Conquest of Ireland	
Inchiquin fails to stop Nelson and the Parliamentarians from advancing south	11	01	1649				Arklow	Cromwellian Conquest of Ireland	
The Parliamentarians capture southern ports; Munster rejects Inchiquin and accepts the Parliamentarians	11		1649					Cromwellian Conquest of Ireland	
Cromwell sieges the port city of Waterford	11	24	1649	12	02	1649	Waterford 1st (Siege Starts)	Cromwellian Conquest of Ireland	
Cromwell gives up the siege of the port city of Waterford when winter begins	12	02	1649				Waterford 1st (Siege Ends)	Cromwellian Conquest of Ireland	
Parliamentarians advance north and rout the Royalists	12	06	1649				Lisnagarvey	Cromwellian Conquest of Ireland	
Parliamentarians take Carrickfergus from the Royalists	12	13	1649				Carrickfergus 2nd	Cromwellian Conquest of Ireland	
The Laggan Army is useless as a fighting force due to divisions within the ranks			1649					Cromwellian Conquest of Ireland	
The Laggan Army disbands in late 1649			1649					Cromwellian Conquest of Ireland	
Lord Broghill and Henry Cromwell defeat Lord Inchiquin near Cork	03		1650				Mallow	Cromwellian Conquest of Ireland	
Cromwell sieges Kilkenny	03	22	1650	03	28	1650	Kilkenny (Siege Starts)	Cromwellian Conquest of Ireland	
Cromwell captures Kilkenny	03	28	1650				Kilkenny (Siege Ends)	Cromwellian Conquest of Ireland	
Cromwell and the Protestant Royalists enter into a treaty - the Ulster Scots and Laggan Army also accept the treaty	04	26	1650					Cromwellian Conquest of Ireland	
Covenanters clans in far northern Scotland defeat Scottish Royalists	04	27	1650				Carbisdale	Scotland - Civil Issues	
Cromwell's army begins the siege / attack of Clonmel	04	27	1650	05	18	1650	Clonmel (Siege Starts)	Cromwellian Conquest of Ireland	
Cromwell's army surrounds Tecroghan Castle and begins a siege of the Confederate stronghold	05		1650	06	25	1650	Tecroghan (Siege Starts)	Cromwellian Conquest of Ireland	
The Parliamentarians decimate a Confederate relief force headed for Clonmel	05	10	1650				Macroom	Cromwellian Conquest of Ireland	
Cromwell's army takes a beating but takes control of Clonmel after the Royalists escape	05	18	1650				Clonmel (Siege Ends)	Cromwellian Conquest of Ireland	
Cromwell returns to England; Ireton takes command in Ireland	05	27	1650					Cromwellian Conquest of Ireland	
Castlehaven and the Confederates fail to end the siege of Tecroghan Castle	06	19	1650				Tecroghan (Siege Continues)	Cromwellian Conquest of Ireland	
The Confederate Army of Ulster is crushed by Coote and ceases to be a fighting force	06	21	1650				Scarrifholis	Cromwellian Conquest of Ireland	
Sir Robert Talbot surrenders Tecroghan Castle to Cromwell's army	06	25	1650				Tecroghan (Siege Ends)	Cromwellian Conquest of Ireland	
Ireton begins a siege and blockade of Waterford	07		1650	08	06	1650	Waterford 2nd (Siege Starts)	Cromwellian Conquest of Ireland	
Preston surrenders Waterford to Ireton	08	06	1650				Waterford 2nd (Siege Ends)	Cromwellian Conquest of Ireland	
Felim O'Neill surrenders Charlemont to Coote and Venables	08	14	1650				Charlemont 7th	Cromwellian Conquest of Ireland	
Cromwell and the English defeat David Leslie and the Scots	09	03	1650				Dunbar	3rd English; Civil War	Scotland in the Wars of Three Kingdoms
Clanricarde and the Confederate Army of Connacht are decimated by Axtell	10	25	1650				Meelick Island	Cromwellian Conquest of Ireland	
Ormond and Inchiquin leave Ireland	12	11	1650					Cromwellian Conquest of Ireland	
Ireton's troops cross the Shannon	06	02	1651					Cromwellian Conquest of Ireland	
The siege of Limerick is reinstated by Ireton and the Parliamentarians	06	19	1651	10	27	1651	Limerick 2nd (Siege Starts)	Cromwellian Conquest of Ireland	
Athlone is surrendered to Coote and the Parliamentarians	06	18	1651				Athlone	Cromwellian Conquest of Ireland	
John Lambert and the English outflank and defeat the Scots	07	20	1651				Inverkeithing	3rd English; Civil War	Scotland in the Wars of Three Kingdoms
Lord Broghill routs an Irish Confederate relief force led by Muskerry	07	26	1651				Knocknaclashy	Cromwellian Conquest of Ireland	
Galway is loosely sieged by Coote after the fall of Athlone	08		1651	05	12	1652	Galway 3rd (Siege Starts)	Cromwellian Conquest of Ireland	
The Parliamentarians fail to hold back Charles II and his Scottish supporters at the River Mersey	08	13	1651				Warrington Bridge	3rd English; Civil War	
The English decimate the Earl of Derby and reinforcements for the campaign of Charles II	08	25	1651				Wigan Lane	3rd English; Civil War	
The English capture the bridge at Upton helping to facilitate the battle to capture Worcester	08	28	1651				Upton	3rd English; Civil War	
George Monck attacks and captures Dundee inflicting great damage on the defenders	08	29	1651	09	01	1651	Dundee	3rd English; Civil War	Scotland in the Wars of Three Kingdoms
Cromwell defeats Charles II decisively ending the English Civil Wars	09	03	1651				Worcester 3rd	3rd English; Civil War	Scotland in the Wars of Three Kingdoms
Limerick surrenders to Ireton and the Parliamentarians	10	27	1651				Limerick 2nd (Siege Ends)	Cromwellian Conquest of Ireland	
Ireton dies of the plague	11	26	1651					Cromwellian Conquest of Ireland	
Galway surrenders after being blockaded / besieged for several months	05	12	1652				Galway 3rd (Siege Ends)	Cromwellian Conquest of Ireland	
Clanricarde takes refuge in Ballyshannon	05	16	1652	06	28	1652	Ballyshannon (Siege Starts)	Cromwellian Conquest of Ireland	
Clanricarde surrenders Ballyshannon	06	28	1652				Ballyshannon (Siege Ends)	Cromwellian Conquest of Ireland	
The Scot Highlanders stop an English force from attacking Glencairn's army	02	10	1654				Tullich	Glencairn's Rising in Scotland	
The Scot Highlanders flee at the onset of the battle - the Highland uprising ends	07	19	1654				Dalnaspidal	Glencairn's Rising in Scotland	

== Sources ==
- Bagwell, Richard (1909). Ireland under the Stuarts and under the Interregnum. London: Longmans, Green and Co.
- Bennett, Martyn (2016). Historical Dictionary of the British and Irish Civil Wars, 1637-1660. Rowman & Littlefield.
- Carte, Thomas (1851). The Life of James Duke of Ormond. Oxford: Oxford Universary Press.
- Coffey, Diarmid (1914). O'Neill and Ormond - A Chapter of Irish History. Dublin: Maunsel & Company.
- "The Eleven Years War 1641-52 – A Brief Overview". The Irish Story. 2020.
- Gardiner, Samuel R. (1901). History of the Great Civil War, 1642-1649, Vol. I, 1642-1644. Longmans, Green, and Co. ISBN 9780900075209.
- Gardiner, Samuel R. (1889). History of the Great Civil War, 1642-1649, Vol. II, 1644-1647. Longmans, Green, and Co. ISBN 9780900075209.
- Gardiner, Samuel R. (1905). History of the Great Civil War, 1642-1649, Vol. III, 1645-1647. Longmans, Green, and Co.
- Gardiner, Samuel R. (1893). History of the Great Civil War, 1642-1649, Vol. IV, 1647-1649. Longmans, Green, and Co.
- Hardiman, James (1820). The History of the Town and Country of the Town of Galway. Dublin: W. Folds and Sons.
- "Ireland's Wars". Never Felt Better. 20 June 2012.
- McKenny, Kevin (2005). The Laggan Army in Ireland, 1640-1685: The Landed Interests, Political Ideologies and Military Campaigns of the North-West Ulster Settlers. Dublin: Four Courts Press.
- Plant, David. "Various and Sundry". BCW Project. David Plant.
- Scott, David (2003). Politics and War in the Three Stuart Kingdoms, 1637-1649. Macmillan International Higher Education. ISBN 9781137207098.
- "Various and Sundry". BHO British History Online. University of London.
- "Various and Sundry". Britannica. Encyclopædia Britannica, Inc. 2020.
- "Various and Sundry". Wikipedia, The Free Encyclopedia. Wikimedia Foundation.
- Wood-Martin, William Gregory. History of Sligo, County and Town: From the accession of James I. to the Revolution of 1688. Hodges, Figgis and Company.
