= John Middleton, 1st Earl of Middleton =

Scottish noble and mercenary (c. 1608–1674)

The Right Honourable The Earl of Middleton
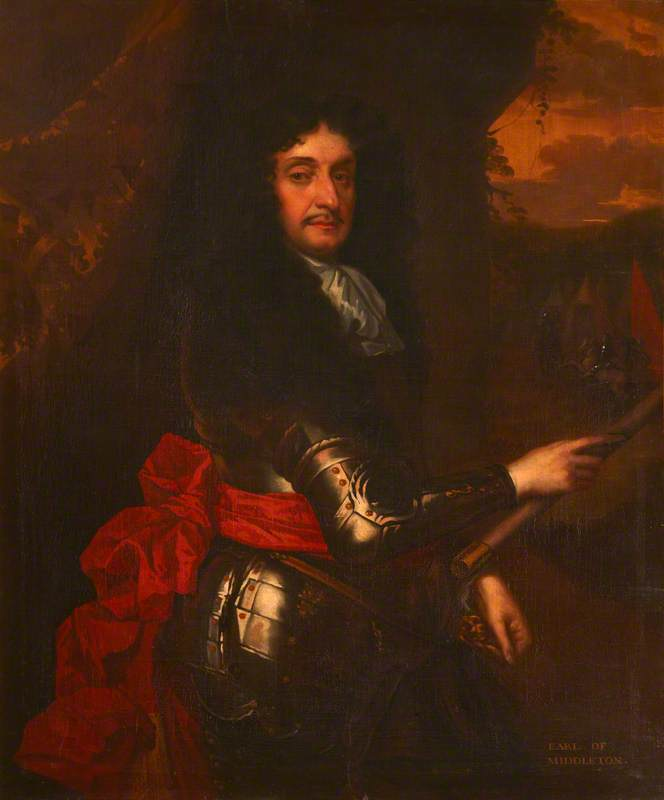
- John Middleton, 1st Earl of Middleton

Governor of Tangier
- In office 1670 to 1672 – 1672 to 1674

Governor of Rochester Castle
- In office 1663–1668

Lord High Commissioner to the Parliament of Scotland
- In office 1661–1662

Commander in chief Scotland
- In office 1646 to 1647 – 1660 to 1663

Personal details
- Born: 1608 Caldhame, Kincardineshire, Kingdom of Scotland
- Died: 3 July 1674 (aged 66) English Tangier
- Spouses: Grizel Durham (m. 1639–1666) Martha Carey (m. 1667)
- Children: Charles Middleton, 2nd Earl of Middleton; Grizel Douglas, Countess of Morton; Helen Lyon, Countess of Strathmore and Kinghorne; Hon. John Middleton; Lady Elizabeth Middleton
- Relatives: John Middleton (great-nephew)
- Occupation: Soldier

Military service
- Battles/wars: Thirty Years War; Wars of the Three Kingdoms; Battle of Philiphaugh; Battle of Preston; Battle of Worcester; Glencairn's rising; Battle of Dalnaspidal

John Middleton, 1st Earl of Middleton (c. 1608 – 3 July 1674) was a professional soldier and mercenary from Kincardineshire in Scotland. Beginning his career in the Thirty Years War, during the Wars of the Three Kingdoms he fought for the Covenanters and Parliamentarians until 1648, when he switched sides to the Royalists.

One of his colleagues in the 1639 to 1640 Bishops' Wars was Montrose, who later became a Royalist. Despite their similar backgrounds and views, Middleton pursued him with considerable vigour, reportedly because his father died when Montrose's men set fire to his house.

Middleton supported the Royalists in the Second and Third English Civil Wars and took part in the unsuccessful 1654 Glencairn's rising. Rewarded by being appointed Lord High Commissioner to the Parliament of Scotland after the 1660 Stuart Restoration, he fell out with his political colleagues and was removed from office in 1663.

However, viewed by Charles II as a capable and reliable soldier, he was compensated with two key strategic commands, first Rochester Castle, then English Tangier where he died in July 1674.

== Personal details ==
Born around 1608, John was the eldest son of Robert Middleton of Caldhame and his wife Catherine Strachan; his younger brother Alexander and nephew George both served as Principal of King's College, Aberdeen. John was great uncle of George's son John Middleton; and great-great uncle of Charles Middleton, 1st Baron Barham.

== Military career ==
In early life Middleton served as a soldier in France; later he fought against Charles I both in England and in Scotland, being especially prominent at the Battle of Philiphaugh and in other operations against James Graham, 1st Marquess of Montrose.

Middleton held a high command in the Engager army which took part in the Second English Civil War and was taken prisoner at the Battle of Preston in August 1648. He joined Charles II when he arrived in Scotland in 1650 to be crowned, but fell out with the ruling Kirk Party and was compelled to do public penance at Dundee. He commanded the Royalist cavalry at the Battle of Worcester in August 1651 and was captured before escaping to Paris.

In 1653, Middleton was chosen to lead a projected Scottish rising; he reached Scotland in February 1654, but the participants were deeply divided and the revolt ended in defeat at the Battle of Dalnaspidal in July. He remained in Scotland until 1655 when he rejoined the exiled court and was created Earl of Middleton in 1656, with the subsidiary title of Lord Clermont and Fettercairn. He was made colonel of a Scottish infantry regiment in the Royalist Army in Exile, although actual command was exercised by Lord Newburgh.

== Political career ==
Following the Stuart Restoration in May 1660, Middleton was appointed commander-in-chief of the troops in Scotland and Lord High Commissioner to the Parliament of Scotland, which he opened in January 1661. His extreme Royalism led to a political struggle with the Earl of Lauderdale and in 1663 he was deprived of his offices. He then served as Lieutenant-General of the Kent militia and Governor of Rochester Castle from 1663 until 1668, before being appointed governor of English Tangier in 1670, acquired when Charles married Catherine of Braganza. He died there on 3 July 1674 of injuries sustained by falling down the stairs after a drinking bout.

== Family ==
Coat of arms of the Earl of Middleton

John Middleton married (contract July 1639), Grizel Durham, a daughter of James Durham of Pitkerro and Luffness. She died in September 1666. They had five children together:

- Charles Middleton, 2nd Earl of Middleton (1649/1650–1719), married Lady Catherine Brudenell, daughter of Robert Brudenell, 2nd Earl of Cardigan, and Ann Savage, had children.
- Lady Grizel Middleton, married William Douglas, 9th Earl of Morton. One child who died in infancy.
- Lady Helen Middleton, married Patrick Lyon, 3rd Earl of Strathmore and Kinghorne. They had eight children.
- Two daughters, names not known, who both died in 1669 unmarried and without issue.

Middleton's second wife was Lady Martha Carey (1635/6–1706), married 16 December 1667 at St. Andrew's, Holborn, daughter of Henry Carey, 2nd Earl of Monmouth and his wife Martha Cranfield. They had two children:

- John Middleton (1668–1696). Died unmarried without issue.
- Lady Elizabeth Middleton (1672–1748), married William Spelman. They had one child who died young.

== See also ==
- Cromwell's Act of Grace

== Sources ==
- Furgol, Edward M. (2004). "Middleton, John, first earl of Middleton (c.1608–1674)". Oxford Dictionary of National Biography (online ed.). Oxford University Press. doi:10.1093/ref:odnb/18674. (Subscription, Wikipedia Library access or UK public library membership required.)
- Royle, Trevor (2004). Civil War: The War of the Three Kingdoms 1638-1660. Brown, Little. ISBN 978-0316861250.
- Thomson, Oliver (2018). Zealots: How a Group of Scottish Conspirators Unleashed Half a Century of War in Britain. Amberley Publishing. ISBN 978-1445677958.

Peerage of Scotland
New creation	Earl of Middleton; 1656–1674	Succeeded by Charles Middleton
Parliament of Scotland
Preceded by None during the Commonwealth	Lord High Commissioner; 1660–1663	Succeeded by The Earl of Rothes
Military offices
Preceded by Henry Norwood	Colonel of the Tangier Regiment; 1668–1674	Succeeded by The Earl of Inchiquin
Preceded by Henry Norwood	Governor of Tangier; 1669–1670 (first term)	Succeeded by Hugh Chomondeley
Preceded by Hugh Chomondeley	Governor of Tangier; 1672–1674 (second term)	Succeeded by The Earl of Inchiquin
