= Glencairn's rising =

Royalist revolt in Scotland, 1653–1654

- Part of Wars of the Three Kingdoms
| Date | 1653–1654 |
| Location | Scottish Highlands |
| Result | Protectorate victory |

Belligerents
| Scottish Royalists loyal to Charles II | The Protectorate |

Commanders and leaders
| Earl of Glencairn; John Middleton; Ewen Cameron of Lochiel | Robert Lilburne; George Monck; Sir Thomas Morgan |

Strength
| 3,500 foot and 1,500 horse | Unknown |

Casualties and losses
| Unknown | Unknown |

Glencairn's rising was a Royalist revolt in Scotland against the Protectorate of Oliver Cromwell from 1653 to 1654. It was led by William Cunningham, 9th Earl of Glencairn (1610–1664), who was given command of the Royalist forces in Scotland by Charles II. Initially successful, it began to suffer divisions when John Middleton arrived to replace Glencairn as commander, resulting in a series of duels between officers. It was defeated when Thomas Morgan caught Middleton's army at Dalnaspidal on 19 July 1654. Although the rising was unsuccessful it forced a change of policy by the Cromwellian regime, which now looked for a reconciliation with former Royalists and Engagers.

== Origins ==
William Cunningham, 9th Earl of Glencairn was given command of the Royalist forces in Scotland by Charles II. He convened a meeting of Scottish notables at Lochearn in August 1653. Among those present were John Murray, 1st Marquess of Atholl, Archibald Campbell, eldest son of the Marquis of Argyll, Lord Loin, Donald MacDonell of Glengarry, Ewen Cameron of Lochiel, John Graham of Duchray and Colonel Blackadder of Tullyallan. These notables then mustered their vassals and supporters to form a small army of about 60 horse, and a force of foot, made up of 60–80 Lowlanders and 150 Highlanders. The governor of Stirling Castle, Colonel Kidd, sallied out to suppress this force, but was defeated at Aberfoyle. This victory boosted morale and the rising gained some support from Lowland Scottish lords, forcing the Commonwealth government to adopt a more conciliatory attitude to these groups.

== Divisions ==
William Cunningham, 9th Earl of Glencairn, leader of the major armed resistance to the Commonwealth regime in Scotland

Although it gained recruits, the rising began to suffer from internal divisions, particularly between the Highlanders who made up the bulk of the forces and the Lowland nobles and officers who were their commanders. In early 1654, nine months into the revolt, John Middleton (1608–1674), a Lowland officer and a veteran of the Battle of Worcester, arrived with a commission to command from Charles II. Despite objections from his followers, Glencairn surrendered control over his forces, which had now reached 3,500 foot and 1,500 horse. Divisions were largely due to petty disputes between Glencairn's and Middleton's respective forces. That evening Sir George Munro, Middleton's aide, insulted Glencairn's forces and the result was a duel between Glencairn and Munro in which the latter was wounded. Glencairn was arrested. He would eventually be released and retire from the conflict. The following day two junior officers from the two camps had a duel of their own in which one was killed and the other was later arrested and hanged. A series of other disputes and duels undermined the leadership of the campaign for the remainder of the rising.

== Defeat ==
Middleton adopted a strategy of raiding and harrying. Although successful in distracting the Commonwealth forces and causing disruption, it soon began to prove counter-productive, as growing unpopularity amongst the civilian population led to a drying up of recruitment. With his return to Scotland after his brief naval command against the Dutch, Monck began a campaign against the rising, making forced marches of between 12 and 20 miles a day in difficult terrain. On 19 July 1654 a force from Monck's command under Thomas Morgan caught Middleton's army. In the resulting Battle of Dalnaspidal the royalists were scattered and a wounded Middleton was forced to escape to the Highlands. The end of the Dutch War meant there was no possibility of foreign aid and government reinforcements were now available to combat the rising. As a result the Royalist military effort petered out. Eventually, Glencairn surrendered to Monck and Middleton escaped to the continent to join the court in exile.

== Consequences ==
Although the rising was unsuccessful it forced a change of policy by the regime, which instead of attempting to replace the landholding classes now looked for a reconciliation with former Royalists and Engagers. This resulted in the Act of Grace and Pardon, proclaimed in Edinburgh on 5 May 1654. Instead of a blanket forfeiture among those implicated in resistance, it named 24 persons (mainly from the nobility) whose lands would be seized, and 73 other landholders who could retain their estates after paying a fine. Even then most of those names were treated with leniency and fines were remitted for confiscations, or were reduced, and some were abandoned.

== See also ==
- Chronology of the Wars of the Three Kingdoms
