= Llangattock Lingoed =

Coordinates: 51.875428°N 2.928747°W

Llangattock Lingoed: Welsh: Llangatwg Lingoed
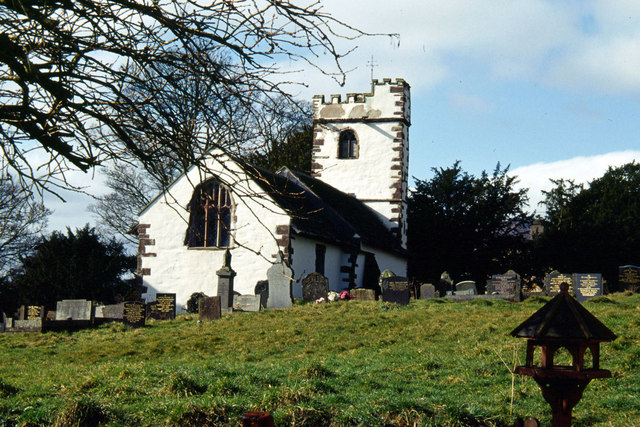
- Church of St Cadoc

- Location within Monmouthshire
- OS grid reference: SO362201
- Principal area: Monmouthshire
- Preserved county: Gwent
- Country: Wales
- Sovereign state: United Kingdom
- Post town: ABERGAVENNY
- Postcode district: NP7
- Dialling code: 01873
- Police: Gwent
- Fire: South Wales
- Ambulance: Welsh
- UK Parliament: Monmouth

Llangattock Lingoed (Welsh: Llangatwg Lingoed) is a small rural village in Monmouthshire, south east Wales. It is located approximately five miles north of Abergavenny, between Abergavenny and Grosmont, a few miles south of the Wales-England border.The village is near the Black Mountains and the Brecon Beacons National Park.

Offa's Dyke Path passes through the village. The Cistercian Way long distance footpath that circumnavigates all of Wales also passes through the village.

== Amenities and history ==
The parish church is St Cadoc's and both the village and the church have a long and interesting history sandwiched as they are in the Welsh Marches between border castles and the historical personalities holding sway at any given time.

The Old Court is a Grade II* listed building situated in the village.
