= Old Court, Llangattock Lingoed =

The Old Court, Llangattock Lingoed
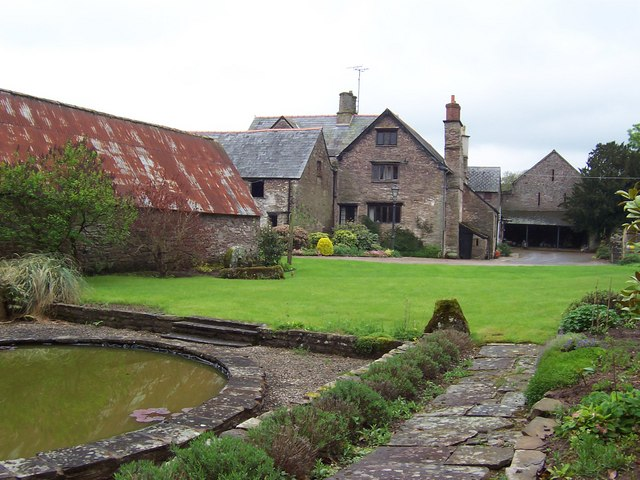
- The Old Court

- Location within Monmouthshire
- 51.8703°N 2.92854°W
- Type: House
- Location: Llangattock Lingoed, Monmouthshire

History
- Built: 15th–17th centuries

Site notes
- Architectural style: Vernacular

Listed Building – Grade II*
- Official name: Old Court, Llangattock Lingoed
- Designated: 5 June 1952
- Reference no.: 1923

The Old Court, Llangattock Lingoed, Monmouthshire is a medieval hall house dating from the late 15th century, with additions from the 17th and 19th centuries. "Of unusual sophistication", it is a Grade II* listed building.

== History ==
The original house was a hall-house, probably dating from 1480–1520. In the 17th century, the Court was greatly extended, with a second storey being added, and the construction of wings to the North-West and South-East. Further modifications were made in the 19th century.

The Court was home to the Morgans, a cadet branch of the Morgans of Tredegar House. Its most prominent inhabitant was Sir Thomas Morgan, 1st Baronet, who fought for Parliament in the Wars of the Three Kingdoms. Sir Thomas seized Chepstow Castle for the Parliamentary forces, and assisted Thomas Fairfax at the siege of Raglan Castle. He later supported the 1660 Stuart Restoration and was made a baronet for his services.

== Description ==
The house is of two storeys, with attics, and an interior still "largely in (its) 17th century state."
