= St Cadoc's Church, Llangattock Lingoed =

Church of St Cadoc, Llangattock Lingoed
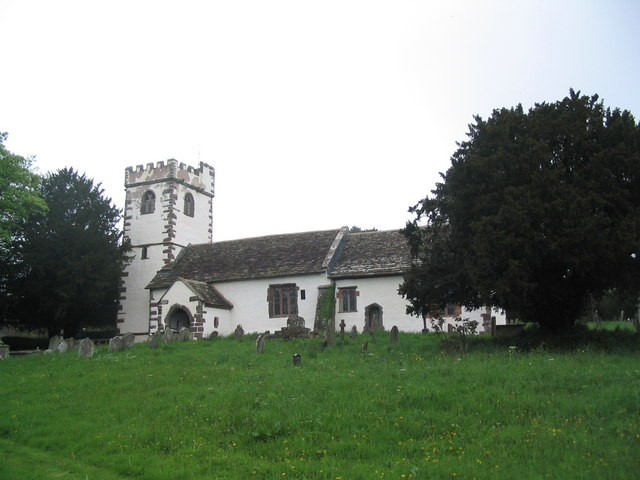
- Church of St Cadoc

- Location within Monmouthshire
- 51.8750°N 2.9276°W
- Location: Monmouth, Monmouthshire
- Country: Wales
- Denomination: Church in Wales

History
- Status: Grade I

Architecture
- Style: Perdendicular
- Years built: 14th/15th century

Administration
- Diocese: Monmouth

The Church of St Cadoc, is the parish church of Llangattock Lingoed, Monmouthshire, Wales and sits in the centre of the village. It is in the Perpendicular style and is a Grade I listed building as of 1 September 1956.

== History and architecture ==
The church is medieval, of Old Red Sandstone with a stone tiled roof. The nave is quite long, ending in a battlemented tower and turret. The church was extensively restored in the 19th century, including work undertaken by John Prichard, following the collapse of the south wall. The church is dedicated to the Welsh Saint Cadoc.

The interior includes a large wall painting of the early 15th century depicting St George slaying the dragon. The Royal Commission on the Ancient and Historical Monuments of Wales describes a possible interpretation of the painting as being a reference to the defeat of Owain Glyndŵr by the English at the battles of Campston Hill (1404) and Grosmont (1405), which were fought near to Llangattock Lingoed.

There also remain some 16th-century pews, which John Newman, the architectural historian, describes as "a rare survival." A timber beam with carved vine leaves and grapes is the remaining part of a late 15th-century rood screen. The church is a Grade I listed building. The medieval cross in the churchyard has its own Grade II listing.

== Sources ==
- Newman, John (2000). Gwent/Monmouthshire. The Buildings of Wales. Penguin. ISBN 0-14-071053-1.
