= Battle of Dalnaspidal =

Part of the Glencairn Rising (1654)

- Part of Glencairn's rising
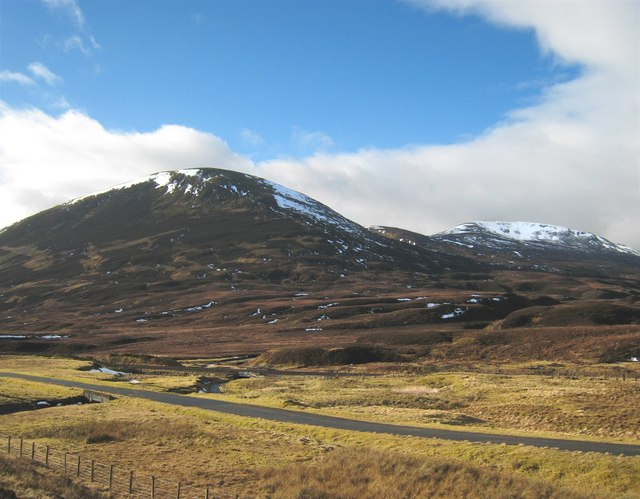
- Dalnaspidal
Date	19 July 1654
Location	Dalnaspidal near Loch Garry, Scotland 56.832°N 4.223°W
Result	Commonwealth victory

Belligerents
Commonwealth	Scottish Royalists

Commanders and leaders
Sir Thomas Morgan; Marquess of Argyll	Earl of Glencairn; Earl of Middleton

Strength
Unknown	1,200 foot 800 horse

Casualties and losses
Unknown.	Unknown
- Scotland

The Battle of Dalnaspidal occurred on 19 July 1654 during the Wars of the Three Kingdoms. It was one of the last engagements in the war bringing an end to the Royalist rising of 1653 to 1654.

== Prelude ==
The Earl of Glencairn raised the Clan MacGregor from Rannoch. He would have no difficulty recruiting them because one of their opponents was the Earl of Argyll, a Campbell, one of their hereditary enemies. Alexander, the 12th chief of Clan Robertson led his men from Fea Corrie. Both forces met above Annat and marched up the old path to Loch Garry.

== Battle ==
On the evening of 19 July 1654, Thomas Morgan surprised John Middleton at Dalnaspidal near Loch Garry on the Drumochter Pass. The Royalist horse had become separated from the foot. When Morgan's superior forces advanced towards them, most of Middleton's cavalry fled, leaving the infantry unprotected. As Morgan's cavalry continued to advance, the Royalist infantry also turned and ran.

== Aftermath ==
The fight at Dalnaspidal broke the Royalist insurrection in the Highlands. Although wounded, Middleton managed to escape into the mountains, but he was never able to gather a substantial force again. Monck wanted all the leaders of the uprising put to death, but the Protector and Council promised a pardon to all those who submitted (see Cromwell's Act of Grace). William, Earl of Glencairn surrendered to General Monck in September 1654. Middleton escaped back to the Continent and rejoined Charles II at Cologne early in 1655.
