= Earl of Middleton =

Title in the Peerage of Scotland

Arms of Middleton: Per fess or and gules, a lion rampant armed and langued azure within a double tressure flory counterflory of the second and first and counterchanged

Earl of Middleton was a title in the Peerage of Scotland. It was created 1 October 1656 for army officer John Middleton, together with the subsidiary title Lord Clermont and Fettercairn, also in the Peerage of Scotland. In 1674, he was succeeded by his son, Charles, who served in political offices under Charles II and James II & VII. In 1693 the second earl joined the exiled king in France and was subsequently tried for treason in absentia on 23 July 1694 and the titles attainted by act of Parliament on 2 July 1695. Charles was made Earl of Monmouth and Viscount Clermont in the Jacobite Peerage of England in 1701.

== Earls of Middleton (1656) ==
- John Middleton, 1st Earl of Middleton (1619–1674)
- Charles Middleton, 2nd Earl of Middleton (1649/1650–1719) (attainted 1695)

== Arms ==
Per fess or and gules, a lion rampant within a double tressure, flowered and counter-flowered with fleurs-de-lis, all counterchanged.
