= John Graham of Duchray =

Scottish landowner and soldier

- Born: 1600; Scotland
- Died: 1700 (aged 99–100)
- Spouse: Marion Graham
- Children: Thomas Graham
- Military career
- Allegiance: William Cunningham, Earl of Glencarin
- Conflicts: Glencairn's Rising
- Other work: Landowner

John Graham of Duchray (Highland Hector, Tetrarch of Aberfoyle) (Scottish Gaelic: Iain Greumach an Dubhchra), Scottish landowner and soldier, was born in Scotland around 1600 and died around 1700. He married Marion Graham of Rednock, and had a son, Thomas Graham of Duchray (younger). Marion Graham, of Rednock, was the daughter of John Graham of Rednock, and was likely the brother of James Graham of Rednock. John Graham of Duchray was likely descended from the Inchbrakie Grahams.

== Biography ==
In 1622, with the consent of Katharine Stewart, John Graham 'Fiar of Duchray', son of William Graham of Duchray, gave the lands of Duchray to Thomas Graham in Inchrie, and to his heir, John Graham. It is unknown whether this Thomas Graham of Inchrie was John Graham's father, but it is known that John Graham was his heir, and Crawfurd's lineage was only brought up in The Scots Peerage to disprove certain errors.

'In 1622, he, with consent of Katherine Stewart, his wife, sold Duchray to Thomas Graham in Inchrie, apparently his uncle, and John, his son'

On 9 September 1646 John Graham of Duchray gave those parts of Scotland, which would be described as part of the lands of Rednoch [Rednock] called Over and Nether Unschenoches [Unschennochs] to Patrick Monteith [Menteith] of Arnebeg [Arnbeg] and Janet Grahame, his spouse and their son James Monteith [Menteith]. On 3 June 1651 John Graham of Duchray gave those parts of Scotland, which would be described as part of the lands of Rednoch [Rednock] called Gramestoune [Grahamston - Grahamstown] to James Graham of Glenny (Mony Vracky).

On 28 July 1651 John Graham of Duchray was ordered (along with Walter Graham of Glenny) by King Charles the II to assist William Graham of Gartmore and Patrick Monteith of Arnbeg to apprehend fugitives and runaways. This order contained clauses dealing with the protection of John Graham of Duchray, exempting him from "all peril and danger they can incur or sustain through their not coming forth as heritours, not withstanding any Acts of Statutes maid in the contrary."

In 1654, John Graham of Duchray was a commander in the forces led by William Cunningham, Earl of Glencarin in Glencairn's Rising. The first forces to join Glencairn, forty footmen bought by the Laird of Duchrie (Duchray) were thought by Louisa Graeme to be the original Forty-Twa or Black Watch. Her book of Graemes and Grahams however, Or & Sable, 1903 (fn.1 p.554) miscited forty-two footmen in place of forty as recorded in Glencairn's Expedition (p.158). His castle Duchray (or Dounans) was burnt by the party of Cromwell's army led by George Monck, 1st Duke of Albemarle before his men, with the aid of others, repelled the attack by the invaders, and the stone structure of the Castle Duchray remained intact. A little westward of the Pass of Aberfoyle, one of Duchray's followers shot one of the English invaders from the opposite side of the river, who fell near a clump of trees which was called Bad an t' Shassonich, or, the Englishman's Clump. In 1655, John Graham of Duchray was the last to sign an agreement with George Monck regarding the peace of the region. John of Duchray is said also to be the author of the account of the Earl of Glencairn's Expedition, which has been reprinted in various sources by Sir Walter Scott.

In 1657, George Monck wrote to William Graham, Lord Kinpoint (who became the 2nd Earl of Airth in 1661) regarding a disagreement between Duchray (Duffra) and Lord Kinpoint, insisting that he let a Colonel Daniel take care of the matter instead.

In 1668, William Graham of Gartmore, who John Graham assisted at the request of the king in 1651, posted his word and wealth as security that a debt, owed for some reason by John of Duchray to John Monteith, son of the deceased Patrick Monteith of Arnbeg.

== Bridge of Aberfoyle ==
In 1671, shortly after gaining the power to take such actions against criminals and debtors within his earldom, William Graham, 8th Earl of Menteith, obtained an arrest warrant for John Graham of Duchray for disobeying the orders of the king by failing to repay a debt. Learning that Thomas Graham of Duchray (the son of John Graham of Duchray) was to attend a baptism, the Earl of Airth took advantage of this family gathering to execute his warrant. And so on 13 February 1671 the Earl and Alexander Muschet, along with a well armed party made their way to the bridge to arrest John Graham of Duchray who was known to be sympathetic to the Covenanters and who likely politically opposed the 7th Earl. John Graham of Duchray held papers of protection from the king, and said 'What dar ye do? This is all your masters' but the papers held protection from removal from certain lands, and not from a civil debt.

The son of Thomas Graham of Duchray, ripe for the christening at the kirk in Aberfoyle in 1671, was placed upon the ground and the Duchray party prepared their swords, guns, and muskets, avowing that half of the Earl's party would be killed and the other half would drown. It is said that the Earl was narrowly missed by several bullets, and one of the Earl's party, a Robert MacFarlane, lost two of his fingers. John Graham of Duchray was placed in the Edinburgh Tolbooth.

The "arrest warrant" at issue on this bridge, likely had to do with Alexander Muschet's Letters of Horning and Poinding against John of Duchray for failure to repay a debt of 2500 Scottish marks.

== Later life ==
A John Graham, Prisoner in Canongate Tolbooth, with no apparent charges against him neither as covenanter or thief, was transported from Leith Tolbooth to the Plantations in 1678, aboard the St. Michael of Scarborough by shipmaster Edward Johnston, on 12 December 1678. The history of the St. Michael of Scarborough speaks of the journey ending with all prisoners being released deep within England, most making their way back to Scotland within 9 months.

John Graham of Duchray was scarcely mentioned again, but in 1686, a pension was granted of five-hundred Scottish marks per year to John Graham of Duchray, with notice of that pension being given to James, Earl of Perth, and the Lords of the Treasury of Scotland, by King James the VII. The document discharged him of the feu duties which were due and unpaid, beginning in November 1671, the same year as the christening in Aberfoyle. The document fully exonerated him for failing to pay those funds.
