= Sir Thomas Morgan, 1st Baronet =

Welsh soldier

Major-General Sir Thomas Morgan Bt
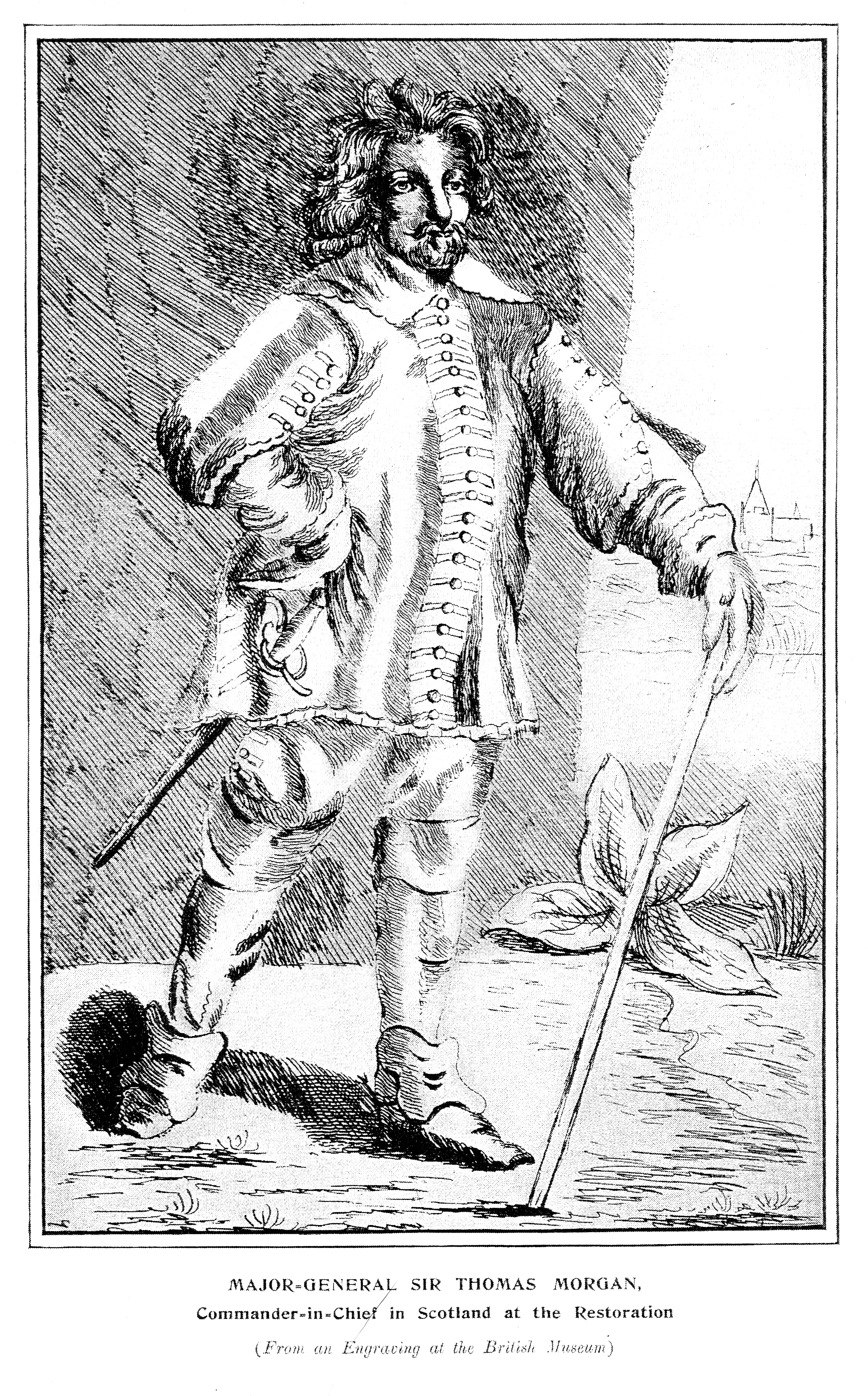
- Sir Thomas Morgan, 1st Baronet

Lieutenant Governor of Jersey
- In office 1665–1679

Deputy Commander-in-Chief Scotland
- In office 1659–1660

Parliamentarian Governor of Gloucester
- In office June 1645 – January 1648

Personal details
- Born: 1604 Old Court, Llangattock Lingoed
- Died: 13 April 1679 (aged 74–75) Old Court, Llangattock Lingoed
- Spouse: Delariviere Cholmondeley (1644

Military service
- Rank: Major-General
- Battles/wars: Eighty Years War; Battle of the Slaak; Wars of the Three Kingdoms; Adwalton Moor; Nantwich; Selby; Marston Moor; Chepstow Castle; Berkeley Castle; Hereford; Stow-on-the-Wold; Hartlebury Castle; Raglan Castle; Dunbar; Dundee; Glencairn's rising; Battle of Dalnaspidal; Anglo-Spanish War (1654–1660); Battle of the Dunes; Portuguese Restoration War

Major-General Sir Thomas Morgan, 1st Baronet (1604 – 13 April 1679) was a professional soldier from Wales who fought for Parliament during the Wars of the Three Kingdoms. As deputy Commander-in-Chief, Scotland, he played an important role in the 1660 Stuart Restoration and was rewarded with being made a baronet.

== Biography ==
Morgan was born in Wales. At 16, having at that time little knowledge of any language but Welsh, Morgan enlisted in Sir Horace Vere's Protestant volunteer expedition which fought in the Thirty Years' War. Morgan fought in the Low Countries and in particular assisted the Dutch in the decisive victory at the battle of the Slaak in 1631.

He fought under Thomas Fairfax in the First English Civil War. In 1645 he was appointed parliamentary governor of Gloucester. In 1646 he took Chepstow Castle and Monmouth, and besieged Raglan Castle. From 1651 to 1657 he assisted General George Monck in Scotland and was promoted to major-general. He was second in command in Flanders in 1657 and knighted on his return in 1658. He rejoined Monck in Scotland, and played a conspicuous part in the Stuart Restoration in Edinburgh. His Scottish command was disbanded in December, but he was rewarded with a baronetcy on 1 February 1661.

Morgan established the English Expedition to Portugal to help the Portuguese fight the Spanish. He was appointed Governor of Jersey in 1665 repairing the Jersey forts and reorganising the militia.

A pamphlet narrating his acts in France and Flanders in 1657 and 1658, said to be by himself was published in 1699.

His family home was the Old Court, Llangattock Lingoed in Monmouthshire.

== Notes ==
Baronetage of England
New creation	Baronet (of Langattock, Monmouth); 1661–1679	Succeeded by John Morgan
