= Loch Garry (Dalnaspidal) =

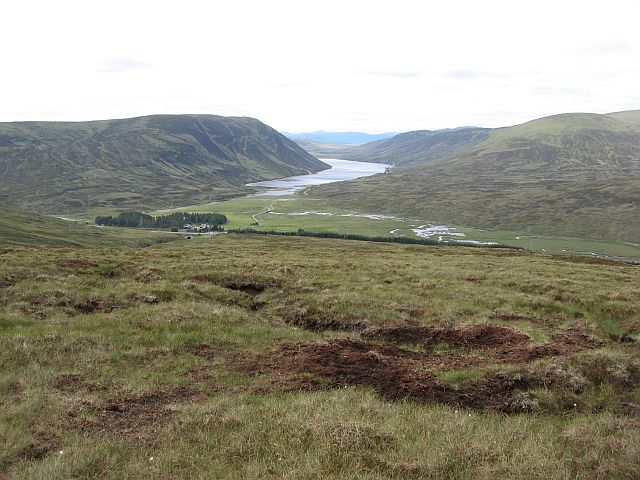
- View of

- Location within Perth and Kinross
- Location: NN630702
- Coordinates: 56.803800°N 4.2451°W
- Type: freshwater loch
- Primary outflows: River Garry
- Max. length: over 4.0 km (2.5 mi)
- Max. width: over 0.4 km (0.25 mi)
- Surface area: 164 ha (410 acres)
- Average depth: 50 ft (15 m)
- Max. depth: 113 ft (34 m)
- Shore length^{1}: 11.2 km (7.0 mi)
- Surface elevation: 412 m (1,352 ft)
- ^{1} Shore length is not a well-defined measure.

Loch Garry is a large upland freshwater loch located in Perth and Kinross in Scotland, within the Forest of Atholl just to the south of the Cairngorms National Park.

== Loch Garry Project ==
A study of the arctic char population of the loch conducted by Ron Greer between 1972 and 1974 concluded that it had become ecologically impoverished as a result of the loss of living and dead plant material from the shallow littoral zone. In 1986, the Loch Garry Project was established to undertake a programme of tree-planting around the loch.
