= St. Michael of Scarborough =

The St. Michael of Scarborough was a ship of the Atlantic that was set to transport Scottish prisoners to the Thames, so that they could be transported by Ralph Williamson to Plantations of America and was mastered in 1678 by Edward Johnston. Williamson was likely headed for West Indies in 1679, but due to the longer than expected journey from Leith to the Thames, when he arrived, Williamson was nowhere to be found. It is of some belief that the voyage never took place, and is said that the majority of the prisoners were released and made their way back to Scotland, and some were rearrested at a later date.

The majority of covenanters who were to be aboard the ship were confined in Glasgow and then moved to the Edinburgh Tolbooth when they refused to take an oath against their religion.

== List of Scots to be Transported from Leith to American Plantations Aboard the St. Michael of Scarborough, 1678 ==
This is a list of passengers on the St. Michael of Scarborough which left Leith Tolbooth on 12 December 1678, and likely arrived in the Thames in December of that Year. It was compiled using sources from David Dobsons book regarding Scots Banished to the American Plantations, which makes reference to original sources from the Scottish Privy Council as well as others.

1. Alexander Anderson, Covenanter
2. John Anderson, Covenanter
3. William Angus, Covenanter
4. John Arnot, Covenanter
5. David Barclay, Covenanter
6. James Blackwood, Covenanter
7. John Bowie, Covenanter
8. James Braidwood, Covenanter
9. James Brown, Covenanter
10. John Brown, Covenanter
11. Alexander Buchanan, Covenanter
12. Andrew Buchanan, Covenanter
13. John Cavers, Covenanter
14. John Clark, Writer
15. Richard Clydesdale, Covenanter
16. Mungo Cochran, Covenanter
17. John Cumin, Covenanter
18. David Crosbie, Covenanter
19. Robert Dicks, Covenanter
20. Arthur Dougall, Covenanter
21. John Fairbairn, Covenanter
22. Alexander Findlay, Covenanter
23. Edward Gay, Covenanter
24. Thomas Govan, Covenanter
25. William Govan, Covenanter
26. John Graham
27. Archibald Haddoway, Covenanter
28. Mr John Harroway
29. John Jervy
30. David Kidd
31. William Laing
32. Donald McDonald
33. Gilbert Marnock, Covenanter
34. James Maxwell, Covenanter
35. James Maxwell (younger), Covenanter
36. Robert Maxwell, Covenanter
37. James Miller, Covenanter
38. William Niven
39. Steven Porteous
40. Robert Reid, Weaver
41. Robert Reid, Cathcart
42. William Steven, Covenanter
43. Alexander Stewart, Covenanter
44. Adam Stobie, Covenanter
45. William Temple
46. John Yeaman, Covenanter
47. William Yeaman, Covenanter
