= Samuel Rutherford =

Scottish Presbyterian minister

The Reverend Samuel Rutherford
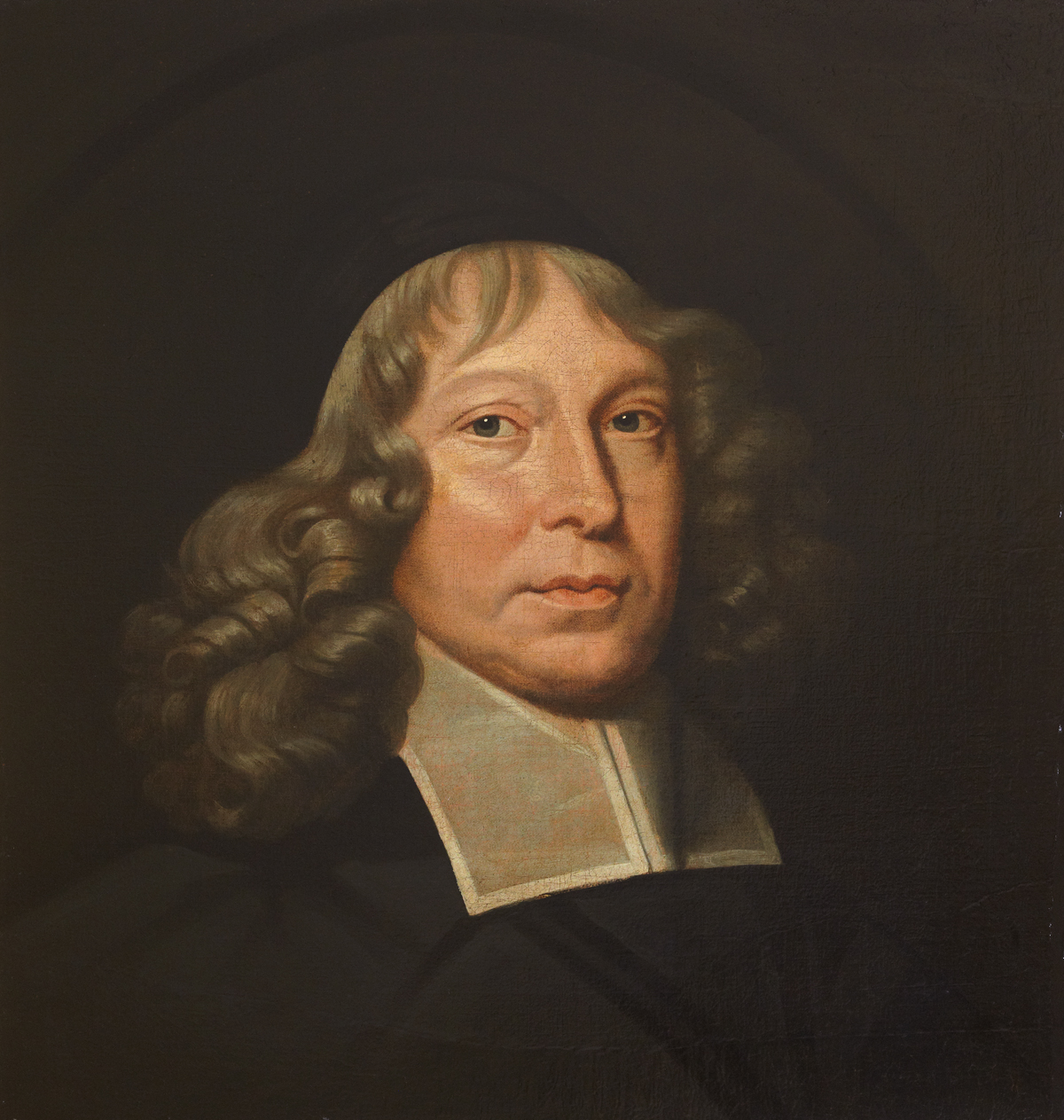
- Born: c. 1600; Nisbet, Roxburghshire, Scotland
- Died: 29 March 1661 (aged 60–61); St. Andrews, Scotland
- Education: University of Edinburgh (MA)

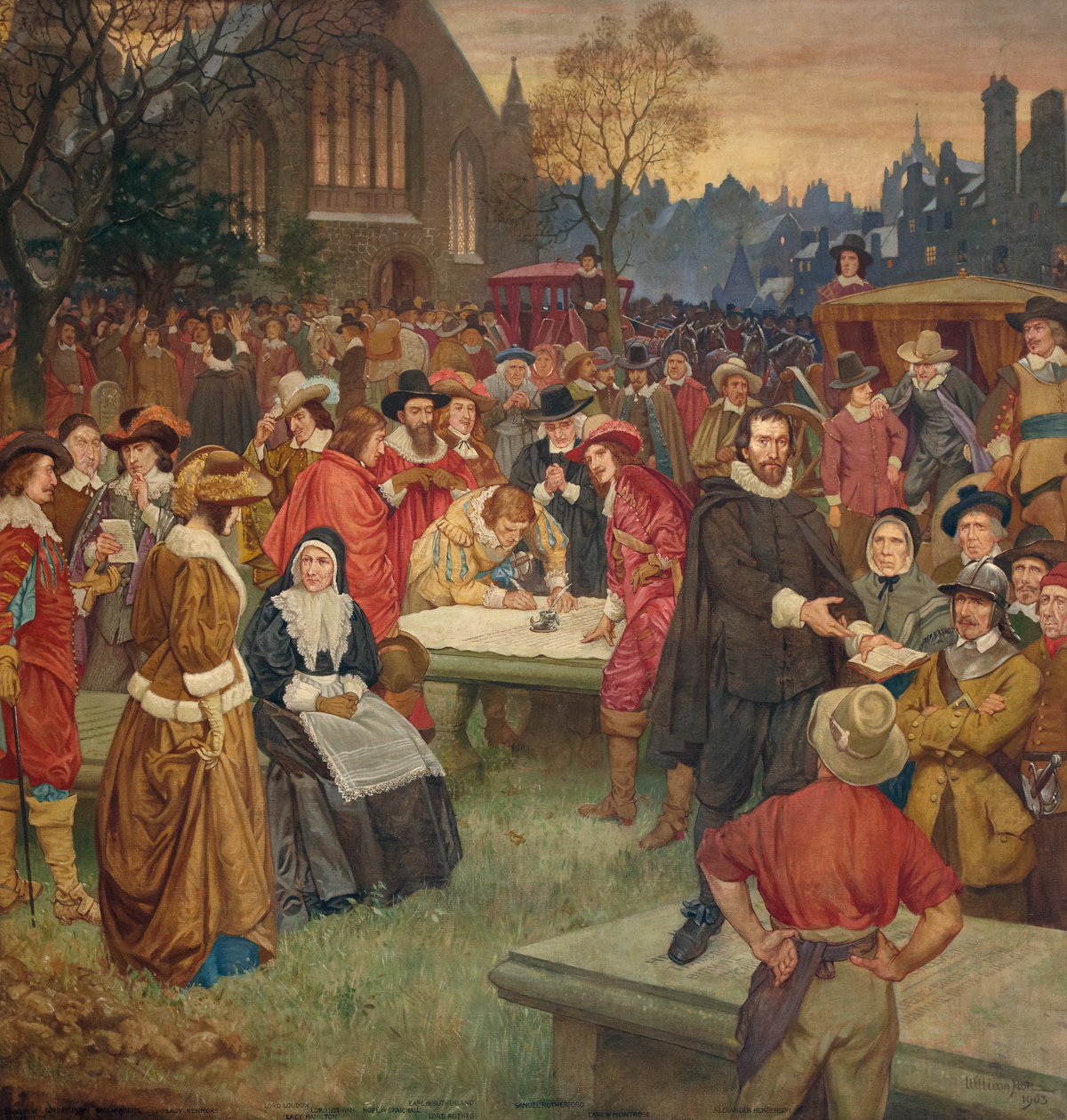
The Signing of the National Covenant. The Victorian painter William Hole places Henderson (standing on the gravestone) at the centre of events in 1638. Archibald Johnston is on the left and Samuel Rutherford is also depicted.

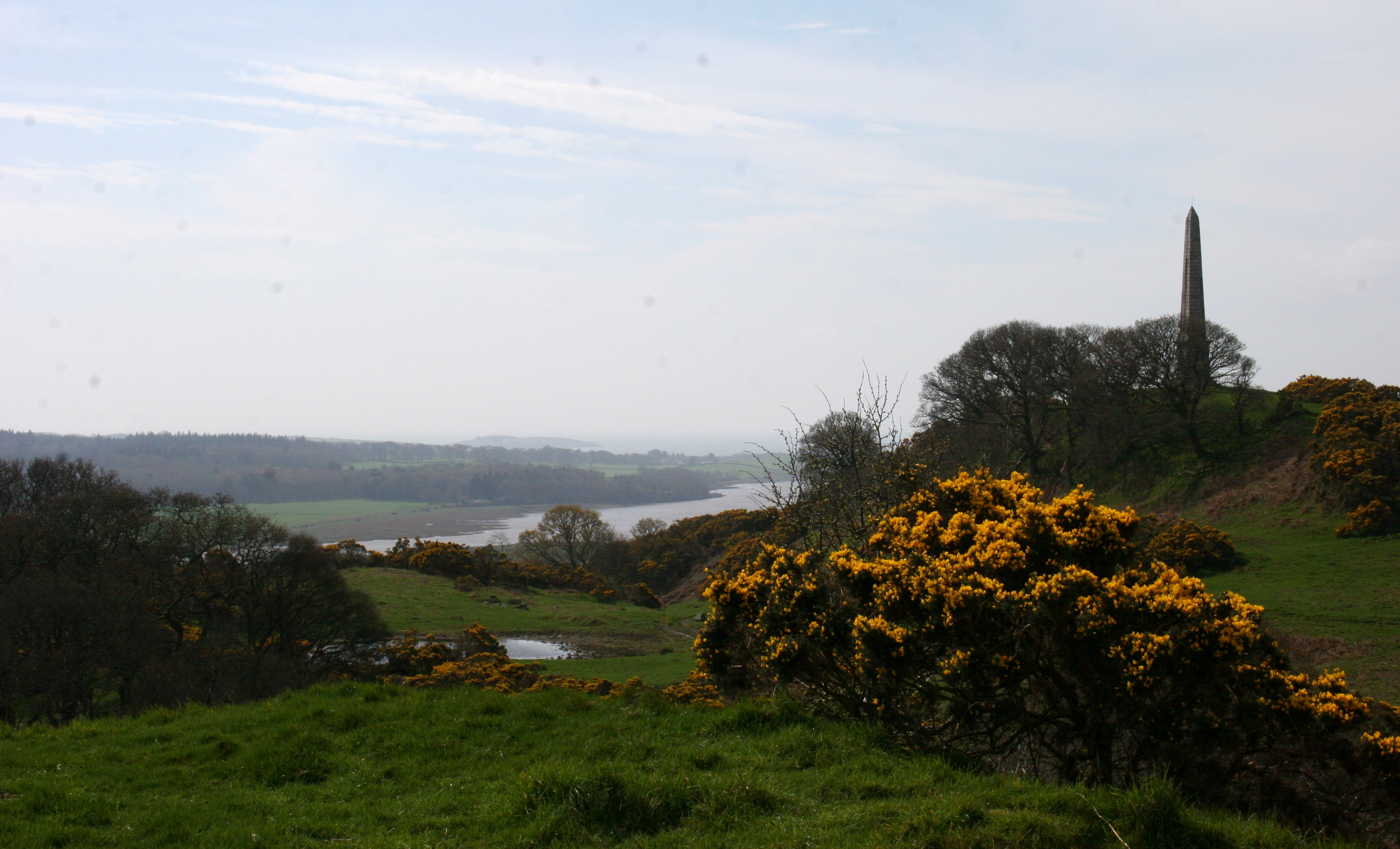
Rutherford's Monument, Anwoth

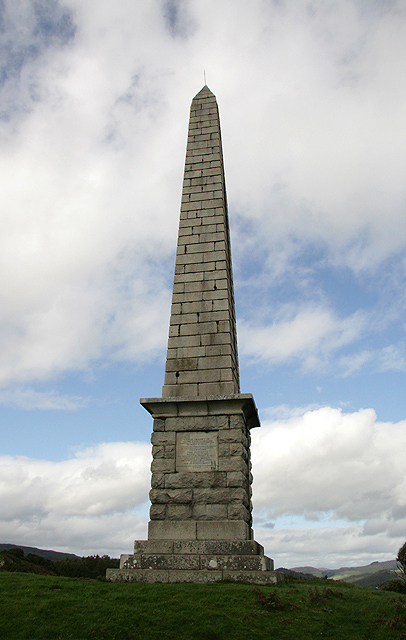
Rutherford's Monument

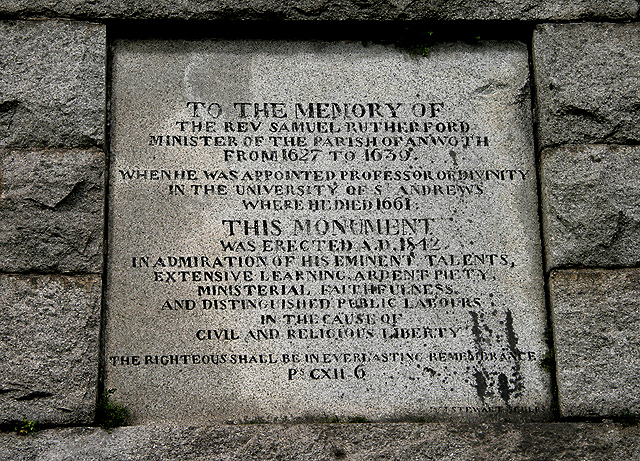
The inscription stone on Rutherford's Monument

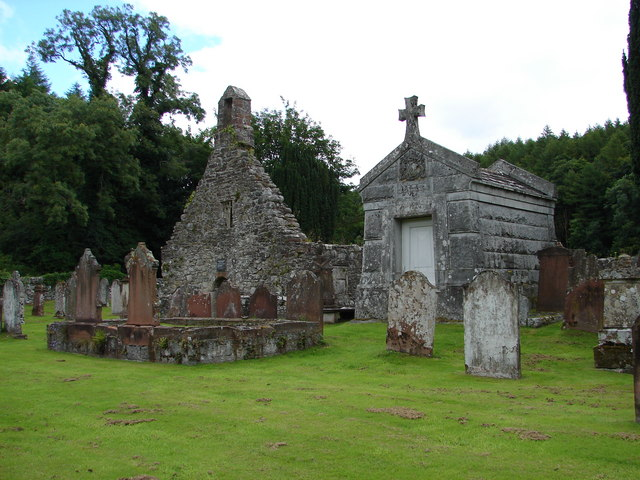
Anwoth Old Kirk and Kirkyard

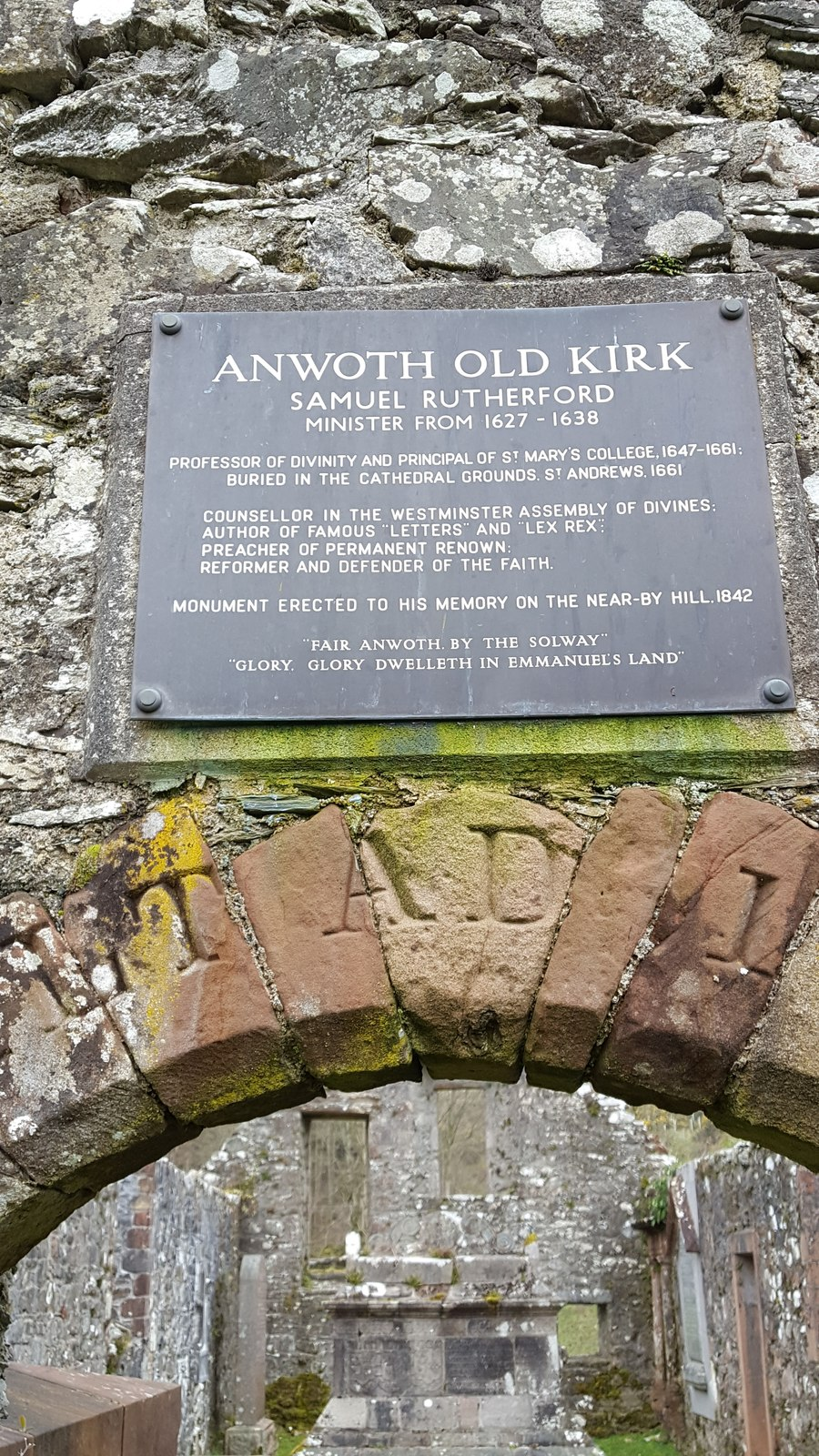
Memorial plaque to Samuel Rutherford

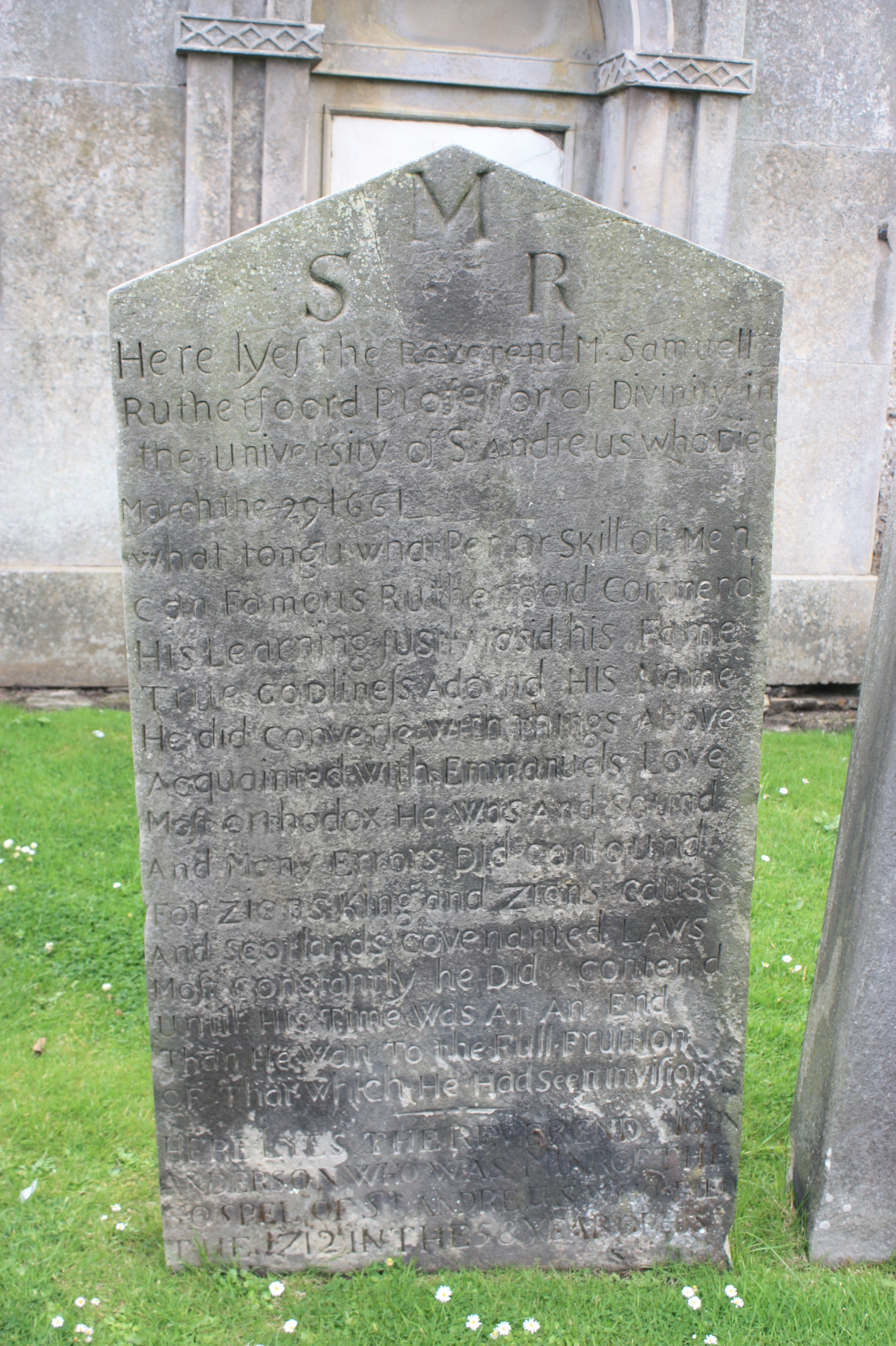
The grave of Master Samuel Rutherford, St Andrews Cathedral churchyard

Samuel Rutherford (also Rutherfurd or Rutherfoord; c. 1600 – 29 March 1661) was a Scottish Presbyterian minister and theologian and one of the Scottish Commissioners to the Westminster Assembly.

== Life ==
Samuel Rutherford was born in the parish of Nisbet (now part of Crailing), Roxburghshire, in the Scottish Borders, about 1600. Nothing certain is known as to his parentage, but he belonged to the same line as the Roxburghs of Hunthill (from whom Sir Walter Scott was descended) and his father is believed to have been a farmer or miller. A brother was school-master of Kirkcudbright, and was a Bible Reader there, and another brother was an officer in the Dutch army.

Rutherford was educated at Jedburgh Grammar School and the University of Edinburgh. After graduating with an M.A. in 1621, he was appointed regent of Humanity at Edinburgh in 1623. He demitted that office in 1626 because of an accusation of immoral conduct with Euphame Hamilton, whom he had married earlier that year. The accusation may have actually been motivated by Rutherford marrying without episcopal or academic authority. He was admitted to Anwoth Kirkcudbrightshire, Galloway in 1627, probably without Episcopal sanction. It was said of him there that "he was always praying, always preaching, always visiting the sick, always catechising, always writing and studying". One of his patrons in Galloway was John Gordon, 1st Viscount of Kenmure who died in 1644. His wife, Jane Campbell, Viscountess Kenmure, was a regular correspendent and a continuing supporter of him and his work.

In 1630 he was summoned before the Court of High Commission, but the charge of non-conformity was not persisted in. Mainly for his publication of a work against Arminianism he was again accused in 1636 by Bishop Sydserff, and after proceedings at Wigtown, was cited before the Commission and prohibited, 27 July, from exercising ministerial office, and ordered to reside in Aberdeen during the King's pleasure. During this period he wrote most of his well-known Letters. His writing desk there was said to be, "perhaps the most effective and widely resounding pulpit then in old Christendom."

In February 1638 Rutherford returned to Anwoth and attended the Glasgow Assembly that year as one of two commissioners from his Presbytery. Shortly afterwards he was elected one of the ministers of Edinburgh, but the Commission of Assembly appointed him, in preference, Professor of Divinity at St Andrews, which office he only accepted on condition that he should be allowed to act as colleague with Robert Blair, one of the ministers of St Andrews, 7 January 1639. He was a member of succeeding Assemblies and consistently supported the Covenanting Party therein. In 1643 he was appointed one of the four main Commissioners of the Church of Scotland to the Westminster Assembly and preached several times before Parliament, remaining in London for four years.

Rutherford was appointed to Principalship of St Mary's College in St Andrews (later merging to become St Andrews University) in 1647 in place of Robert Howie. He was offered in 1648 a Divinity Professorship at Harderwyck in Holland, in 1649 the chair at Edinburgh, and in 1651 he was twice elected to a Professorship at Utrecht, but all these he declined. In 1643, 1644, 1650, and 1651 he was elected rector of the university, and in 1650 on Charles II.'s visit to St Andrews, he made a Latin speech to him on the duty of Kings. Rutherford was a staunch Protester during the controversy in the Scottish Presbyterian church between the Resolutioners and Protesters in the 1650s.

After the Restoration he was one of the first marked out for persecution: his work Lex, Rex was ordered by the Committee of Estates to be burnt at the Crosses of Edinburgh and St Andrews by the hand of the common hangman, while the "Drunken Parliament" deprived him of all his offices and voted that he not be permitted to die in the college. He was cited to appear before Parliament on a charge of treason, but he died 29 March 1661 [the date — 20th — on his tombstone is an error]. He is buried in the churchyard of St Andrews Cathedral just west of the bell tower. The epitaph on his tombstone includes 'Acquainted with Emmanuel's Love'.

== Legacy ==
One of the classical figures of the Church of Scotland, Rutherford's influence during his lifetime, as scholar, preacher, and writer, was profound and wide, and after his death his name received a popular canonisation which it retains to this day. Some forty editions of his Letters have been reprinted (Bonar's edition contains 365), and innumerable anecdotes of his sayings and doings are enshrined in, and constitute no inconsiderable part of the Scottish tradition. Among his last words were: "Glory shines in Immanuel's Land," on which Mrs Anne Boss Cousin founded her hymn, "The Sands of Time are sinking."

There is also a monument to Rutherford, a Category B listed granite obelisk erected in 1842 on the hilltop overlooking his former parish at Anwoth, in the village of Gatehouse of Fleet, southwest Scotland.

== Family ==
He married firstly in 1626, Euphame Hamilton, who died June 1630, and had issue — Marie, baptised 14 April 1628. He later married again on 24 March 1640, Jean M'Math, who was buried in Greyfriars Churchyard on 15 May 1675, and had issue — Agnes (married William Chiesley, W.S.), died 29 July 1694, and six others who predeceased him. He is known to have been friendly with James Guthrie.

== Writings ==
Rutherford's Letters have been both lionized and criticized. His English contemporary, Richard Baxter remarked that except for the Bible, “such a book as Mr. Rutherford’s Letters, the world never saw the like” while nineteenth-century Baptist theologian Charles Haddon Spurgeon commented on Rutherford's posthumously published "Letters" (1664) by saying, 'when we are dead and gone let the world know that Spurgeon held Rutherford's Letters to be the nearest thing to inspiration which can be found in all the writings of mere men'. Andrew Thomson, a Scottish minister, in a 19th-century biography observed "the letters flash upon the reader with original thoughts and abound in lofty feeling clothed in the radiant garb of imagination in which there is everything of poetry but the form." He continues describing: "individual sentences that supplied the germ-thought of some of the most beautiful spiritual in modern poetry". Elsewhere he talks of "a bundle of myrrh whose ointment and perfume would revive and gladden the hearts of many generations". He also quotes that "each letter, full of hope and yet of heartbreak, full of tender pathos of the here and the hereafter.' Rutherford was also known for other spiritual and devotional works, such as Christ Dying and drawing Sinners to Himself, "The Trial and Triumph of Faith".

Rutherford's political book Lex, Rex, or The Law and the Prince (1644) was written in response to John Maxwell's Sacro-Sanctum Regum Majestas (1644) and raised Rutherford to eminence as a political thinker. It justified defensive wars and active resistance to lawfully constituted authority, and presented a theory of limited government and constitutionalism. More recently, scholars have noted that Lex, Rex contains a version of the legal theory of "constituent power." After the Restoration of Charles II, Lex, Rex was burned at Edinburgh and St. Andrews by the hand of the common hangman, and after his death it was put on the University of Oxford's list of prohibited books.

"Lex Rex" has sometimes confused commentators into thinking that Rutherford was in favour of civil liberty. Instead, Rutherford advocated the Two Kingdoms ideal of Church and State popularized in Scotland by Andrew Melville. This occurs in a number of his works, but can be seen most easily in the second half of his "Due Right of Presbyteries" (1644). While it forbade the king from holding an office in the Church, it also made him responsible for overseeing and enforcing the true religion.

Not surprisingly, Rutherford was vehemently opposed to liberty of conscience. His A Free Disputation against Pretended Liberty of Conscience (1649) opposed the views of Roger Williams and others, and has been described as "perhaps the ablest defence of persecution ever to appear in a protestant nation" and as "the ablest defence of persecution during the seventeenth century." It raised the ire of John Milton, who named Rutherford in his sonnet on the forcers of conscience in the Long Parliament.

Rutherford was also a strong supporter of the divine right Presbyterianism (the idea that the Presbyterian form of church government is mandated in the Bible). He was involved in written controversies over church government with the New England Independents (or Congregationalists). His works in this area were A Peaceable Plea for Paul's Presbytery in Scotland (1642), followed by the Due Right of Presbyteries (1644), the Divine Right of Church Government and Excommunication (1648) and A Survey of 'A Survey of that Sum of Church Discipline' penned by Thomas Hooker (1655). New England Congregationalists responding to Rutherford included not only Thomas Hooker but also John Cotton and Richard Mather.

== List of works ==
1. Exercitationes pro Divina Gratia Amsterdam 1636
2. A Peaceable and Temperate Plea for Paul's Presbytery in Scotland London 1642
3. A Sermon before the House of Commons, on Daniel, London 1644
4. The Due Right of Presbyteries London 1644
5. Lex Rex, or The Law and the Prince London 1644
6. A Sermon before the House of Lords on Luke 7:22 London 1645
7. The Trial and Triumph of Faith London 1645
8. The Divine Right Of Church Government and Excommunication London 1646
9. Christ Dying and Drawing Sinners to Himself London 1647
10. A Survey of the Spiritual Antichrist London 1648
11. A Free Disputation against Pretended Liberty of Conscience London 1649
12. The Last and Heavenly Speech and Glorious Departure of John, Viscount Kenmure Edinburgh 1649
13. Disputatio Scholastica de Divina Providentia Edinburgh 1649
14. The Covenant of Life Opened Edinburgh 1655
15. A Survey of 'The Survey of that Sum of Church Discipline' penned by Mr. Thomas Hooker London 1658
16. Influences of the Life of Grace London 1659
17. Joshua Redivivus, or Mr Rutherford's Letters 1664
18. Examen Arminianismi Utrecht 1668
19. A Testimony left by Mr. S. Rutherford to the Work of Reformation uncertain date
20. A Treatise on Prayer 1713
21. The Cruel Watchman, The Door of Salvation Opened Edinburgh 1735
22. Twelve Communion Sermons Glasgow 1876
23. Quaint Sermons Hodder & Stoughton, London 1885
24. Rutherford’s Catechism: Containing the Sum of Christian Religion. London, 1886
25. A discussing of some arguments against Cannons and ceremonies in God’s worship in David G. Mullan (ed.) Religious Controversy in Scotland 1625–1639. (Edinburgh: Scottish Historical Society, 1998), pp. 82–99

Initially sourced from Andrew Bonar's Letters of Samuel Rutherford, with updates and corrections.

== See also ==
- Covenanters
- Andrew Bonar who edited Rutherford's Letters for publication in 1863
- George Gillespie
- Alexander Henderson
- Robert Baillie
- Rutherford Institute, a conservative civil-liberties organization named for Rutherford

== Sources ==
- Anderson, William (1877). "Rutherford, Samuel". The Scottish nation: or, The surnames, families, literature, honours, and biographical history of the people of Scotland. Vol. 3. A. Fullarton & co. p. 393-395. This article incorporates text from this source, which is in the public domain.
- Baillie, Robert (1841–1842a). Laing, David (ed.). The letters and journals of Robert Baillie ... M.DC.XXXVII.-M.DC.LXII. Vol. 1. Edinburgh: R. Ogle.
- Baillie, Robert (1841–1842b). Laing, David (ed.). The letters and journals of Robert Baillie ... M.DC.XXXVII.-M.DC.LXII. Vol. 2. Edinburgh: R. Ogle.
- Baillie, Robert (1841–1842c). Laing, David (ed.). The letters and journals of Robert Baillie ... M.DC.XXXVII.-M.DC.LXII. Vol. 3. Edinburgh: R. Ogle.
- Barnett, T. Ratcliffe (1915). The makers of the kirk. London, Edinburgh, Boston: T. N. Foulis. pp. 189-194.
- Blair, Robert (1754). Memoirs of the life of Mr. Robert Blair. Edinburgh: Printed by David Paterson.
- Blair, Robert (1848). M'Crie, Thomas (ed.). The life of Mr. Robert Blair, minister of St. Andrews, containing his autobiography, from 1593-1636 : with supplement of his life and continuation of the history of the times, to 1680. Edinburgh: Wodrow Society.
- Brodie, Alexander (1863). Laing, David (ed.). The diary of Alexander Brodie of Brodie, MDCLII-MDCLXXX. and of his son, James Brodie of Brodie, MDCLXXX-MDCLXXXV. consisting of extracts from the existing manuscripts, and a republication of the volume printed at Edinburgh in the year 1740. Aberdeen: Printed for the Spalding club.
- Campbell, William M. (1941). "Lex Rex and its author". Scottish Church History Society: 204–288.
- Chambers, Robert (1857). Thomson, Thomas (ed.). A biographical dictionary of eminent Scotsmen. New ed., rev. under the care of the publishers. With a supplementary volume, continuing the biographies to the present time. Vol. 4. Glasgow: Blackie. p. 216-222.
- Chisholm, Hugh, ed. (1911). "Rutherfurd, Samuel". Encyclopædia Britannica (11th ed.). Cambridge University Press.
- Christie, James (1909). The records of the commissions of the general assembly of the Church of Scotland holden in Edinburgh in the years 1650-1652. Vol. 3. Edinburgh: Printed at the University Press by T. and A. Constable for the Scottish History Society. pp. 159-166.
- Cousin, John William (1910), "Rutherford, Samuel", A Short Biographical Dictionary of English Literature, London: J. M. Dent & Sons – via Wikisource This article incorporates text from this source, which is in the public domain.
- Douglas, J. D. (1964). Light in the north : the story of the Scottish Covenanters (PDF). W. B. Eerdmans Pub. Co.
- Fleming, David Hay (1904). The story of the Scottish covenants in outline. Edinburgh: Oliphant, Anderson & Ferrier. p. xii. This article incorporates text from this source, which is in the public domain.
- Gilmour, Robert (1904). Samuel Rutherford : a study, biographical and somewhat critical, in the history of the Scottish Covenant. Edinburgh: Oliphant, Anderson & Ferrier.
- Hewison, James King (1913a). The Covenanters. Vol. 1 (Revised and Corrected ed.). Glasgow: John Smith and son.
- Hewison, James King (1913b). The Covenanters. Vol. 2. Glasgow: John Smith and son.
- Historic Environment Scotland, "Rutherford's Monument (Category B Listed Building LB3295)"
- Howie, John; Carslaw, W. H. (1870). "Samuel Rutherford". The Scots worthies. Edinburgh: Oliphant, Anderson, & Ferrier. pp. 232-242. This article incorporates text from this source, which is in the public domain.
- Innes, A. Taylor (1883). "Samuel Rutherfurd". The Evangelical succession : a course of lectures delivered in St. George's Free Church. Edinburgh: Macniven & Wallace. pp. 125-172.
- Johnston, Archibald, Lord Warriston; Paul, George Morison (1896). Fragment of the Diary of Sir Archibald Johnston, Lord Wariston. (May 21-June 25 1639), The preservation of the honours of Scotland, 1651-52, Lord Mar's Legacies, 1722-27, Letters concerning Highland affairs in the 18th century. Vol. 26. Edinburgh: Printed at the University Press by T. and A. Constable for the Scottish History Society.
- Johnston, Archibald, Lord Warriston; Paul, George Morison (1911). Diary of Sir Archibald Johnston of Wariston (Volume 1: 1632-1639). 1. Vol. 61. Edinburgh: Printed at the University Press by T. and A. Constable for the Scottish History Society.
- Johnston, Archibald, Lord Warriston; Fleming, David Hay (1919). Diary of Sir Archibald Johnston of Wariston (Volume 2: 1650-1654). 2. Vol. 18. Edinburgh: Printed at the University Press by T. and A. Constable for the Scottish History Society. This article incorporates text from this source, which is in the public domain.
- Johnston, Archibald, Lord Warriston; Ogilvie, James D. (1940). Diary of Sir Archibald Johnston of Wariston (Volume 3: 1655-1660). 3. Vol. 34. Edinburgh: Printed at the University Press by T. and A. Constable for the Scottish History Society. Archived from the original on 6 July 2020.
- Murray, Thomas (1828). The Life of Samuel Rutherford. Edinburgh: Oliphant.
- Murray, Thomas (1832). The literary history of Galloway. Edinburgh: Waugh and Innes.
- Rutherford, Samuel (1803). Christ Dying and Drawing Sinners to Himself (scanned by Free Church of Scotland ed.). Calton: SAMUEL and ARCHIBALD GARDNER.
- Rutherford, Samuel (1876). Bonar, Andrew A. (ed.). Fourteen Communion Sermons. Glasgow: Charles Glass & Co.
- Rutherford, Samuel (1885). Bonar, Andrew (ed.). Quaint sermons of Samuel Rutherford : hitherto unpublished. London: Hodder and Stoughton.
- Rutherford, Samuel (1891). Bonar, Andrew A. (ed.). Letters of Samuel Rutherford : with a sketch of his life and biographical notices of his correspondents. Edinburgh: Oliphant Anderson & Ferrier.
- Rutherford, Samuel (1843). Lex, rex, or, The law and the prince : a dispute for the just prerogative of king and people. Edinburgh: Robert Ogle and Oliver & Boyd.
- Scott, Hew (1928). Fasti ecclesiae scoticanae; the succession of ministers in the Church of Scotland from the reformation. Vol. 7. Edinburgh: Oliver and Boyd. pp. 418-420. This article incorporates text from this source, which is in the public domain.
- Smellie, Alexander (1903). "A Deathbed in St Andrews". Men of the Covenant : the story of the Scottish church in the years of the Persecution (2 ed.). New York: Fleming H. Revell Co. pp. 49-58.
- Sprott, George Washington (1897). "Rutherford, Samuel". In Lee, Sidney (ed.). Dictionary of National Biography. Vol. 50. London: Smith, Elder & Co. This article incorporates text from this source, which is in the public domain.
- Spurgeon, Charles Haddon (1891). The Sword and the Trowel. Banner of Truth Trust. ISBN 0-85151388-3..
- Thomson, Andrew (1884). The Life of Samuel Rutherford. London: Hodder & Stoughton..
- Thomson, J. H.; Hutchison, Matthew (1903). The martyr graves of Scotland. Edinburgh: Oliphant, Anderson & Ferrier. pp. 207-208.
- Walker, James (1888). The theology and theologians of Scotland : chiefly of the seventeenth and eighteenth centuries (2nd ed.). Edinburgh: T. & T. Clark.
- Whyte, Alexander (1894). Samuel Rutherford and some of his correspondents; lectures delivered in St. George's Free Church Edinburgh. Edinburgh: Oliphant, Anderson and Ferrier.
- Whyte, Alexander (1913). "Samuel Rutherford". Thirteen appreciations. Edinburgh: Oliphant, Anderson, and Ferrier. pp. 113-127.
- Wodrow, Robert; Leishman, Matthew (1842). Analecta: or, Materials for a history of remarkable providences; mostly relating to Scotch ministers and Christians. Vol. 3. Glasgow: Maitland Club. pp. 88-90.

Attribution
