= Corstorphine Old Parish Church =

- Corstorphine Parish Church
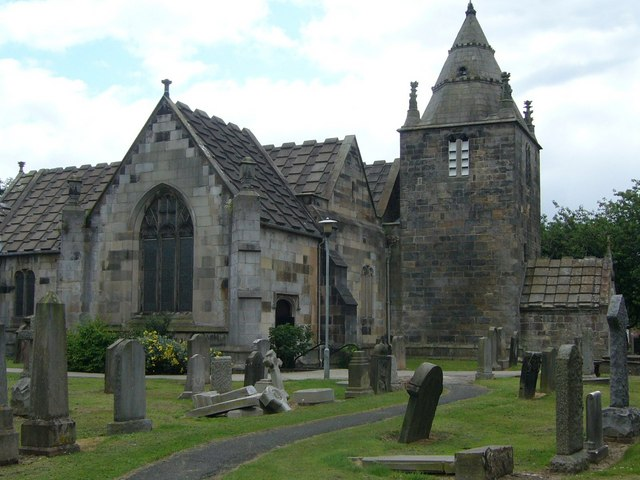
- Corstorphine Old Parish Church
- 55°56′29″N 3°16′55″W
- Location: Corstorphine High Street, Corstorphine
- Country: Scotland
- Denomination: Church of Scotland
- Previous denomination: Roman Catholic
- Website: www.corstorphineoldparish.org.uk

History
- Former name: St John's Collegiate Church
- Founded: 15th century
- Founder: Sir Adam Forrester and Sir John Forrester
- Dedication: John the Baptist

Architecture
- Heritage designation: Historic Environment Scotland
- Designated: 14 December 1970
- Architects: William Burn (1828); George Henderson (1903-1905)
- Architectural type: Gothic

Administration
- Parish: Edinburgh

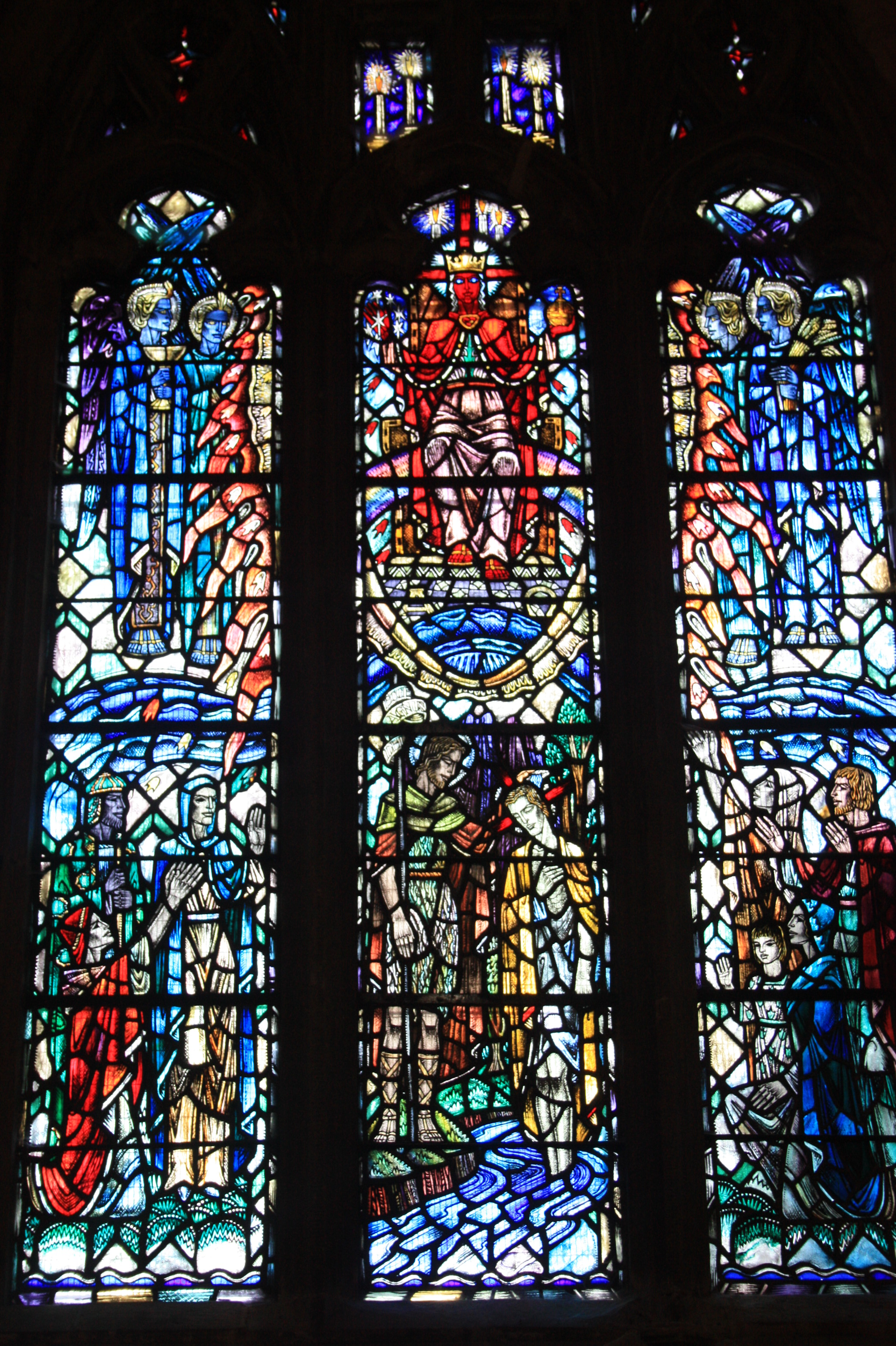
Stained glass window (south window) Corstorphine Parish Church

Corstorphine Old Parish Church, formerly St. John's Collegiate Church, is at the old centre of Corstorphine, a village incorporated to the west area of Edinburgh. Built in the 15th century, in the churchyard of a 12th-century or earlier chapel, the former collegiate church was listed category A by Historic Scotland on 14 December 1970.

== History ==
King David I granted the chapel at Corstophine to Holyrood Abbey in 1128. Before that, it was a satellite chapel of St Cuthbert's Church. By 1158, it had become a church, with altars to Saint Anne and the Holy Trinity.

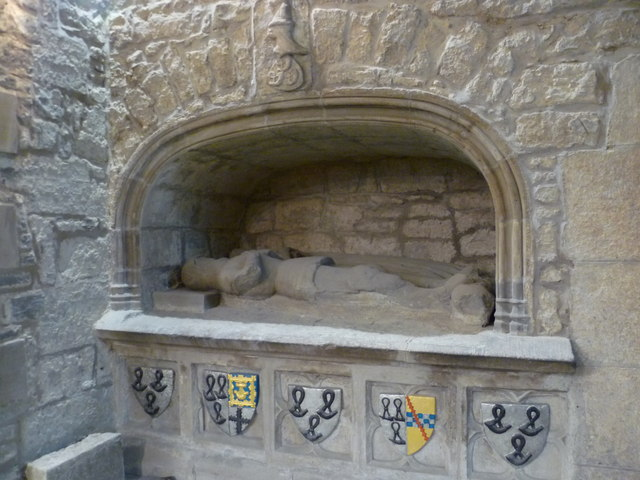
Effigy of Sir John Forrester

A burial chapel was added to the church in 1404 by Sir Adam Forrester, chamberlain to Anabella Drummond, who died by 1405. The church was then dedicated to John the Baptist. The church was elevated to a collegiate church by his son Sir John Forrester in 1429.

The foundation of the current church (on the inner eastmost wall) says the church was built in 1429 in the same churchyard as the earlier parish church, and was completed by 1437. The sandstone church was built with a tower and stone, octagonal spire, rectangular chancel, and a nave with transepts. This included the absorption of earlier Gothic features from the previous building and the erection of the characteristic barrel vaults, which may have concluded by 1436.

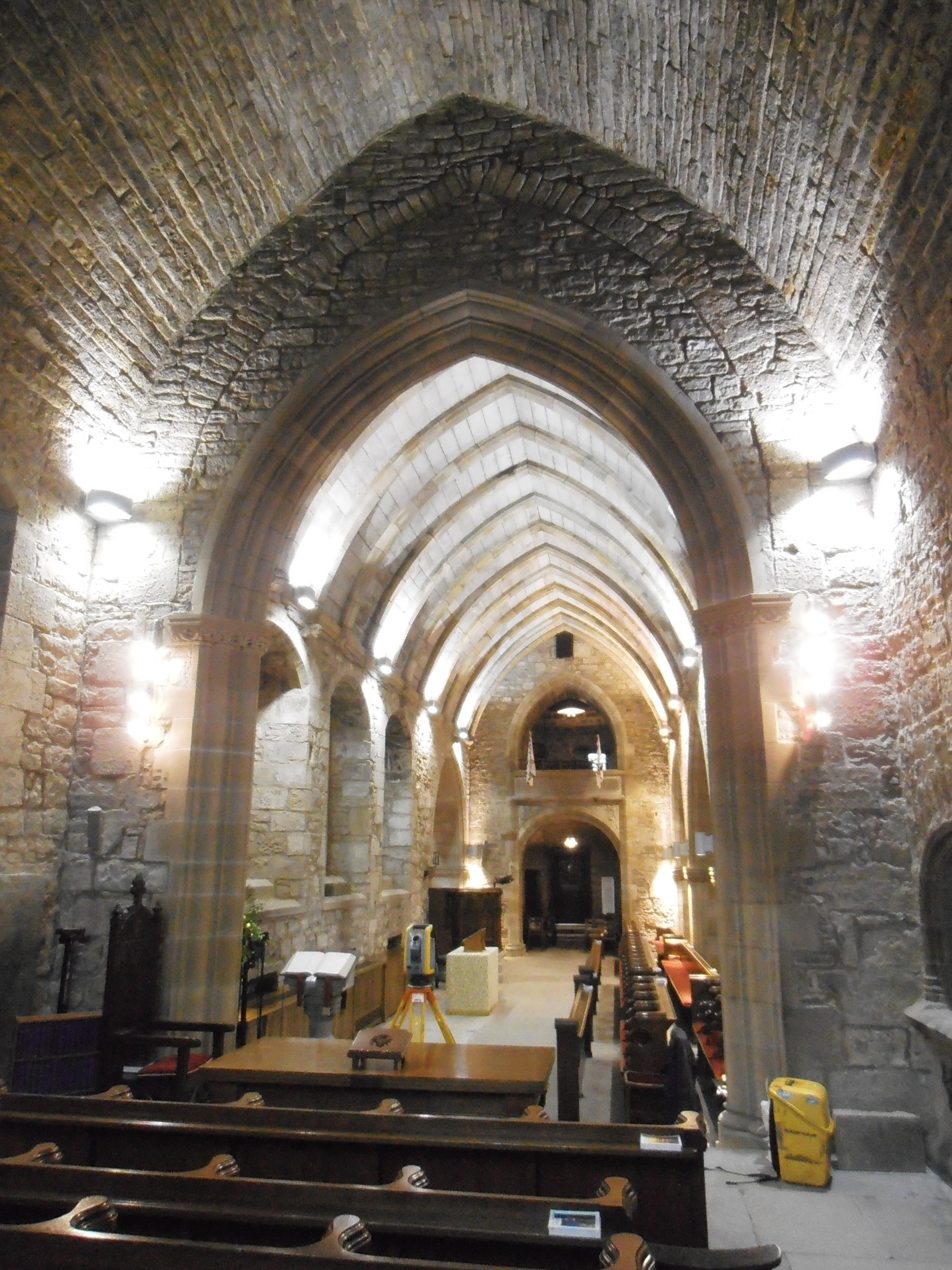
The nave of the church showing the concrete vaults, which replaced the original stone vaults in 1905

The remodeling of the more sophisticated, pre-existing vault like the one in the south transept shows a structurally slightly arbitrary pattern of two semi-quadripartite arrangement of ribs rising from a springing point at the centre of the bays.

In 1548, Thomas Marjoribanks, son of Thomas Marjoribanks, burgess in Edinburgh, replaced Robert Marjoribanks (probably his uncle) upon the occasion of Robert's death, as prepend (vicar) of Corstorphine Kirk and continued through the Reformation until 1567. Rev Andrew Forrester became minister in 1590.

Gogar was added to the parish in 1599.

In 1634, the collegiate church was dissolved and in 1646 the building became the parish church. At that time the 12th-century church was razed and a new aisle was added to the collegiate fabric. Stones from the former church were used to build the porch. In 1828, a restoration by architect William Burn resulted in a two-storey sacristy, renovation of the nave, removal of a 17th-century aisle, and building of a new aisle and transept.

The east choir and the adjacent sacristy are the only original roofs that survived and the vaults of the nave and aisle were re-made in precast concrete ribbed panels during the restoration from 1903 to 1905 by George Henderson.

The church has Scottish heraldic panels and pre-Reformation relics. James Ballantine supplied the Victorian stained glass and Gordon Webster and Nathaniel Bryson supplied the 20th-century windows. Leonardo da Vinci's Last Supper was the inspiration for the heads on the carved corbels made by William Birnie Rhind. On the grounds are a war memorial, vault and gatehouse, surrounded by a boundary wall and cast iron gates.

The ancient stone font, in the south transept, was brought from Gogar church in 1955.

In 1913 a chapel of ease was built to the north-west: St Anne's on St John's Road by Peter MacGregor Chalmers.

== Stained Glass ==
The church includes several windows by the Bannantine Brothers, two by Nythaniel Bryson and one by Douglas Strachan.

Also of note is the memorial window to the mother (Jessie Chrystal Finlayson) and father (John Macmillan) of women's rights campaigner Jessie Chrystal Macmillan. Jessie Chrystal Macmillan, known as Chrystal shared the same name as her mother Jessie Chrystal Finlayson and she never married.

== Former Ministers ==
see

- Nicol Ballantine (d.1470) first known named "provost" of the church
- Robert Cairncross was provost in 1544... left to become Abbot of Holyrood Abbey
- Walter Couper of Gogar (d.1570) reader
- William Arthur MA from 1599 to 1607 - the presbytery proclaimed he was "overleirnit (overeducated) a man for thame (them, the congregation)"
- Robert Rutherford MA from 1607 to 1616
- Robert Lindsay MA from 1617 to 1624
- David Balsillie MA from 1626 to 1654
- Robert Hunter MA from 1655 to 1668
- Thomas Mowbray MA (d.1666) 1665/6
- Archibald Chisholm (1633–1670) from 1666 to 1670
- John Pringle MA 1670/1
- George Henry MA (d.1723) from 1672 to 1689
- Robert Law MA from 1689 to 1692?
- Archibald Hamilton MA (1663–1709) from 1692 to 1709
- George Fordyce (1683–1767) from 1709 to 1767 (the parish's longest serving minister)
- Rev John Chiesley (d.1788) from 1768 to 1788, grandson of Robert Chieslie, John married Helen Pillans daughter of James Pillans
- Thomas Sharp (d.1791) from 1789 to 1791
- James Oliver (d.1814) from 1792 to 1814
- David Scot (1770–1834) from 1814 to 1833
- David Horne (1802–1863) from 1833 to 1863
- Robert Keith Dick Horne (1833–1907) from 1863 to 1881, son of the above
- Rev Dr James Dodds DD (1831–1907) from 1881 to 1907
- Rev James Ferguson (b.1866) from 1895 as assistant to Dodds, as minister 1907 to 1926
- Rev Moira McDonald (current)
