= David Scot =

David Scot (c.1770–1834) was a Scottish orientalist and writer.

== Life ==
Born about 1770 at Penicuik, near Edinburgh, he was the son of William Scot, a small tenant farmer. His father printed a theological pamphlet. It argued against the Scottish dissenters of the First Secession, and in particular against Adam Gib and his work The Present Truth, a Display of the Secession Testimony (1774). Thomas Murray, from personal knowledge of Scot, wrote that the father was a "jobbing gardener" in Colinton parish; and remarked on Scot's diffidence.

Scot was educated at the parish school and the University of Edinburgh. He was licensed as a preacher by the presbytery of Edinburgh on 25 November 1795. Supporting himself by private teaching, he studied medicine, and graduated M.D. on 25 June 1812. He formed a close friendship with Alexander Murray and Dr. John Leyden, and with their help gained a knowledge of a number of Asian languages. He also studied Persian and Hindustani under Borthwick Gilchrist. He acted as tutor to candidates for the East India Company service.

In 1812 Scot was an unsuccessful candidate for the Chair of Hebrew and Oriental Languages at the University of Edinburgh. Through the influence of John Marjoribanks, however, some of whose sons had been his pupils, he obtained the parish living of Corstorphine, near Edinburgh, to which he was presented on 22 August and ordained on 17 November 1814. After a ministry of 19 years he was appointed in 1833 professor of Hebrew in St Mary's College, St Andrews. When on a visit to Edinburgh to attend the meeting of the British Association, he was seized with dropsy, and died on 18 September 1834.

== Works ==
Besides editing Murray's posthumously-published History of the European Languages, Scot was author of:

- Essays on various Subjects of Belles Letters, Edinburgh, 1824.
- Discourses on some important subjects of Natural and Revealed Religion, Edinburgh, 1825.
- Key to the Hebrew Pentateuch, London, 1826.
- Key to the Psalms, Proverbs, Ecclesiastes, and Song of Solomon, London, 1828.

He also wrote a Hebrew grammar (published 1834) for the use of his class. As a member of the Wernerian Natural History Society, he contributed essays on the zoology of the Bible, particularly in volume VI of their proceedings.

== Family ==
In 1832, Scot married Helen Heugh, daughter of John Heugh of Gartcows, Falkirk, who survived him. The couple had no children.
