= Lex, Rex =

1644 book by Samuel Rutherford

Lex, Rex is a book by the Scottish Presbyterian minister Samuel Rutherford. The book, written in English, was published in 1644 with the subtitle "The Law and the Prince". Published in response to Bishop John Maxwell's "Sacro-Sancta Regum Majestas", it was intended to be a comprehensive defence of the Scottish Presbyterian ideal in politics.

Rutherford defended the concepts of defensive wars and pre-emptive wars. He supported the principles of limited government, constitutionalism, and separation of church and state, while opposing both royal absolutism and religious toleration.

== Contents ==
The book defends the rule of law and the lawfulness of defensive wars (including pre-emptive wars) and advocates limited government and constitutionalism in politics and the Two kingdoms doctrine of Church-State relations (which advocated distinct realms of church and state but opposed religious toleration). Rutherford's Lex, Rex utilizes arguments from Scripture, Natural Law and Scottish law, and along with the sixteenth century Vindiciae contra tyrannos, it attacked royal absolutism and emphasized the importance of the covenant and the rule of law (by which Rutherford included Divine Law and Natural Law as well as positive law).

The attack on absolutism, the defence of the rule of law and the emphasis on the importance of the covenant made Lex, Rex a precursor to the social contract idea, and helped pave the way for the political theory of John Locke. However, Rutherford's views on Church-State relations and his opposition to religious toleration were not shared by Locke. This work ended up playing a role in inspiring the American Revolution with its strong stance in favor of rebellion against unjust monarchs if they are tyrannical.

== Persecution of Rutherford during the Stuart Restoration and burning of the book ==
After the Stuart Restoration, the authorities cited Rutherford for high treason, but his death intervened before the charge could be tried. Lex, Rex itself was burned in Edinburgh (the Scottish capital) and St. Andrews (where Rutherford had been principal of the university). In 1683, the Oxford University included it in what ended up being the last official book burning in England.

== See also ==
- Alexander Shields
- Lex animata (law individualised in a prince)
- Natural law
- Rule of law
- Rule of man
- Criticism of monarchy
