= Thomas Murray (writer) =

Scottish printer and writer

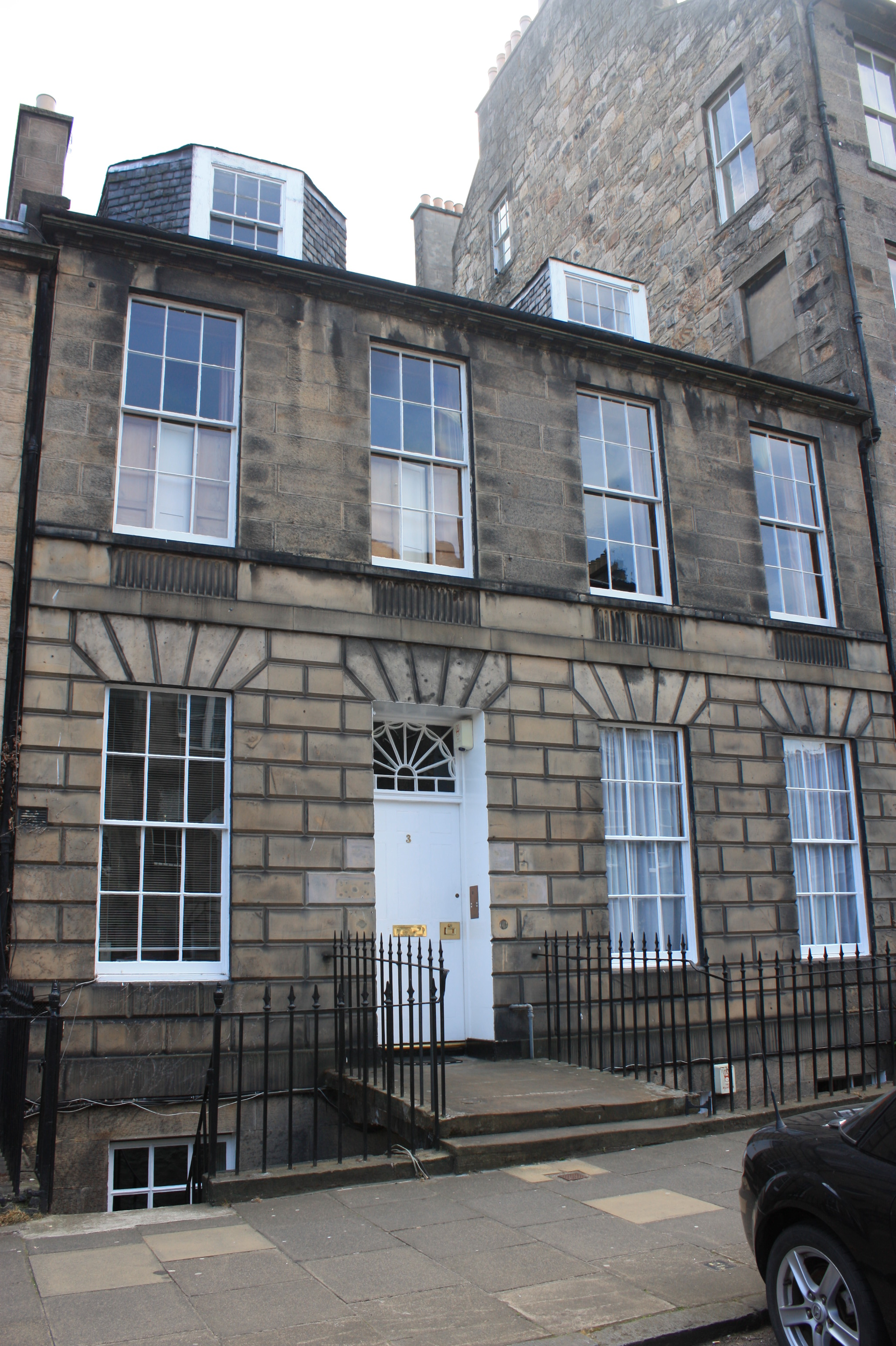
Murray's Edinburgh townhouse at 3 Albany Street, Edinburgh

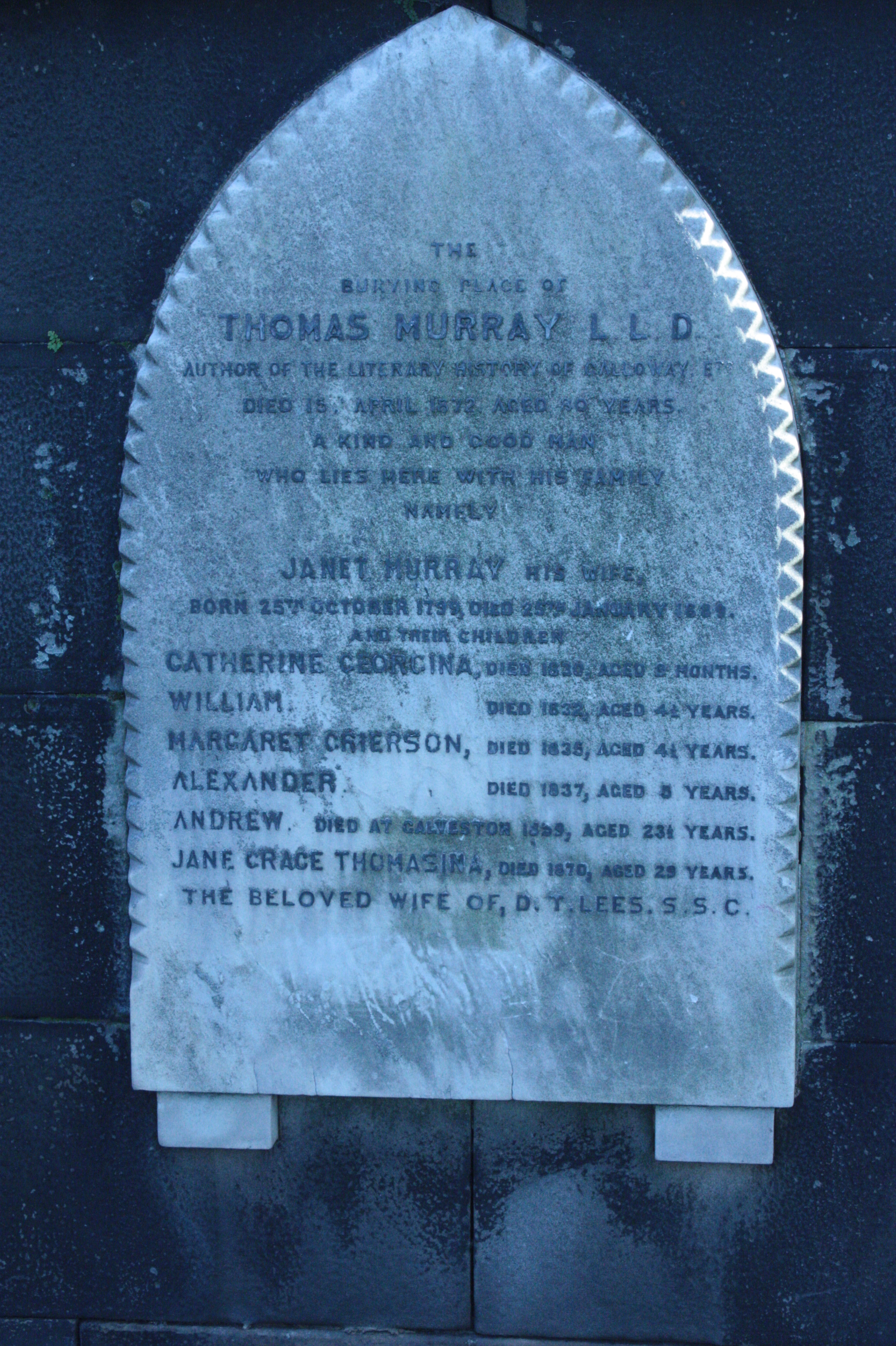
The grave of Thomas Murray, Restalrig Churchyard, Edinburgh

Thomas Murray (1792–15 April 1872) was a Scottish printer and writer. His most noted work is The Literary History of Galloway.

== Life ==
Born into a working-class family in the parish of Girthon, Kirkcudbrightshire, Murray was educated at the parish school, and at the University of Edinburgh, which he entered in 1810. Thomas Carlyle, Alexander Murray and he were early friends, and walked together from Galloway to Edinburgh each session during their university career. A regular correspondence passed between Carlyle and Murray for some years afterwards.

Murray was destined for the ministry of the Church of Scotland, however after obtaining his licence and preaching for some time, he took to writing. He became connected with Sir David Brewster and the staff of writers on Brewster's Cyclopædia, and from contact with Leonard Horner and John Ramsay McCulloch became interested in political economy. In 1843 he was one of the founders, and for many years afterwards (1843–72) secretary, of the Edinburgh Galloway Association; in 1846 he was one of the founders and original members of the Edinburgh Philosophical Institution (of which Thomas Carlyle was president till his death), and acted for about 30 years as secretary of the Edinburgh School of Arts (1844–72). For six years (1854–60) he was a member of the Edinburgh town council, where he acted with the Whig or moderate Liberal party.

In the 1830s he is listed as living at 3 Albany Street in Edinburgh's New Town.

In 1841 Murray established in Edinburgh the printing business of Murray & Gibb, successful, and later becoming Morrison & Gibb.

He died on 15 April 1872 at Elm Bank, near Lasswade. He is buried with his wife Janet Murray (1799-1889) and their five children against the south-east boundary wall of Restalrig Church in eastern Edinburgh.

== Works ==
Murray's works, with pamphlets, were:

- The Literary History of Galloway: from the Earliest Period to the Present Time, Edinburgh, 1822.
- The Life of Samuel Rutherford, Edinburgh, 1828.
- The Life of Robert Leighton, D.D., archbishop of Glasgow, Edinburgh, 1828.
- The Life of John Wycliffe, Edinburgh, 1829.
- Biographical Annals of the Parish of Colinton, Edinburgh, 1863.

He also edited Samuel Rutherford's Last Speeches of John, Viscount Kenmure, Edinburgh, 1827; and Letters of David Hume, Edinburgh, 1841.

== Family ==
Murray left a widow Janet Murray (1799-1889), daughter of Alexander Murray of Wigton, and two daughters, one of whom married William Wilson Hunter.

== Notes ==
=== Sources ===
- Murray, Thomas (1828). The Life of Samuel Rutherford. Edinburgh: Oliphant.
- Murray, Thomas (1832). The literary history of Galloway. Edinburgh: Waugh and Innes.
- Stronach, George (1894). "Murray, Thomas (1792-1872)". In Lee, Sidney (ed.). Dictionary of National Biography. Vol. 39. London: Smith, Elder & Co.

Attribution

This article incorporates text from a publication now in the public domain: Lee, Sidney, ed. (1894). "Murray, Thomas (1792-1872)". Dictionary of National Biography. Vol. 39. London: Smith, Elder & Co.
