= Andrew Thomson (minister) =

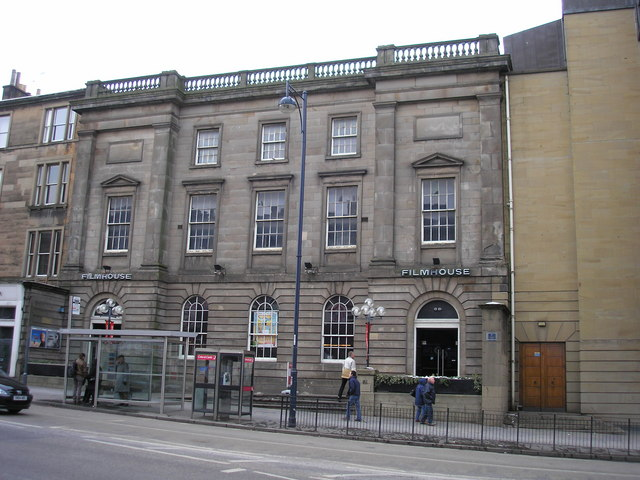
Lothian Road UP Church (Edinburgh Filmhouse

Andrew Thomson FRSE (1814–1901) was a Scottish minister and (from 1847) of the United Presbyterian Church. He was a noted biographer and lecturer, well known for his books on the lives of pre-eminent ministers, and for his book on his travels in the Holy Land and noted for his preface to the Scottish poet, Robert Pollok's "Tales of the Covenanters".

Thomson should not be confused with Rev Andrew Mitchell Thomson (1779-1831), minister of St George's, Edinburgh, an evangelical leader considered a precursor of the Disruption of 1843.

== Life ==
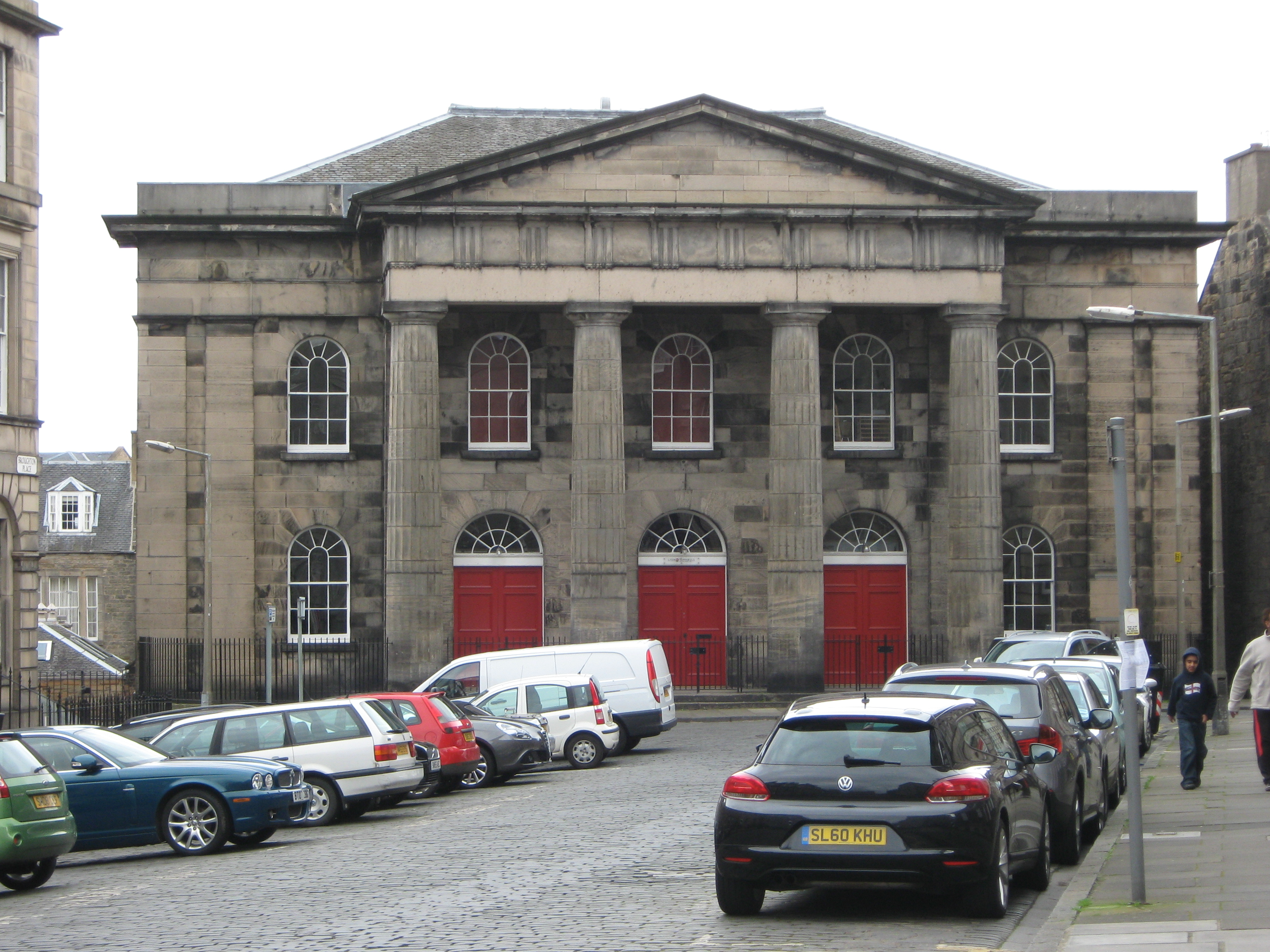
Broughton Place UP Church

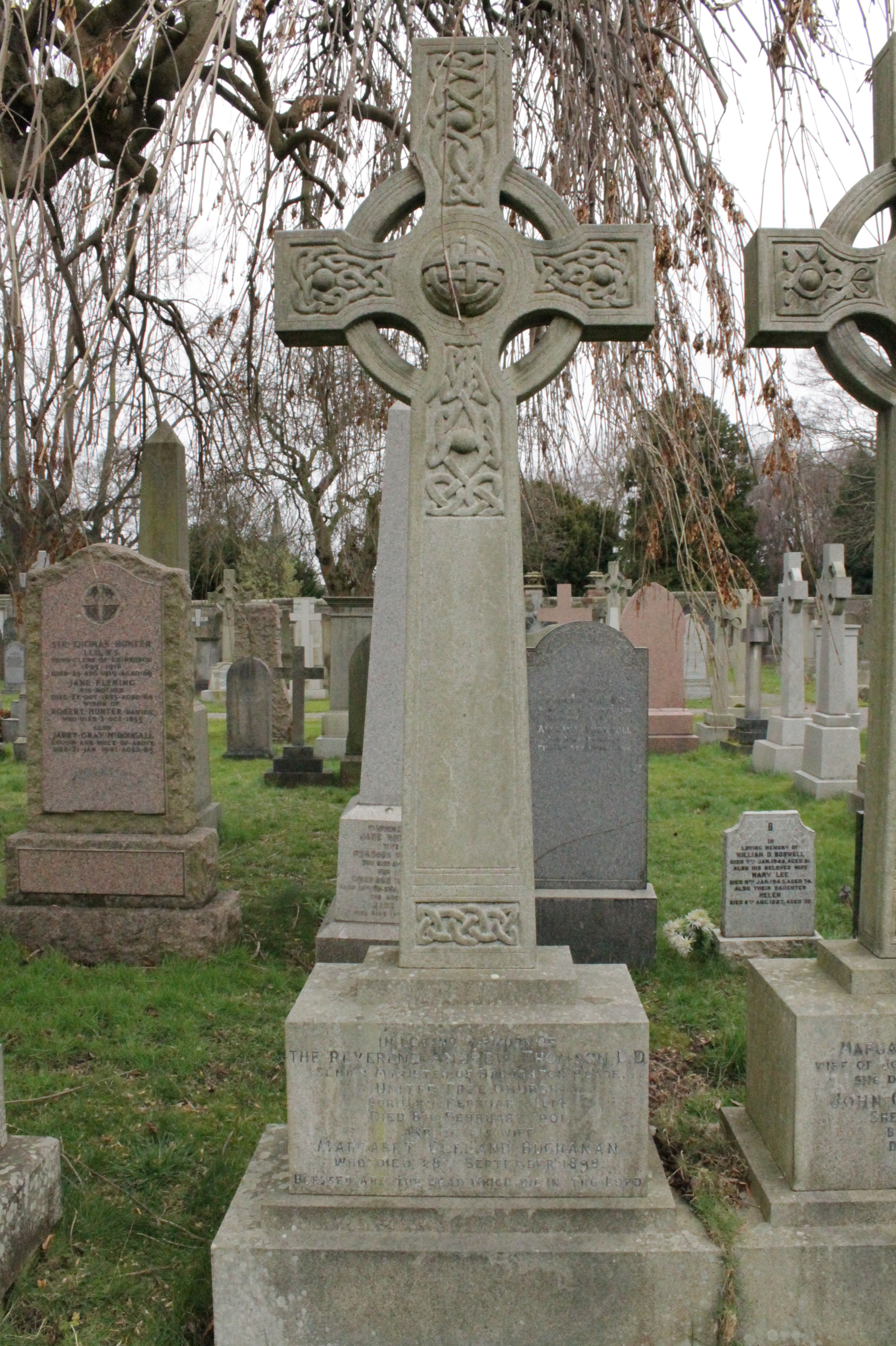
The grave of Rev Dr Andrew Thomson, Dean Cemetery

He was born in Sanquhar in south-west Scotland in February 1814.

In 1837 he was ordained at Lothian Road Church in Edinburgh. He lived then at 30 Alva Street.

Although he remained in the established church at the Disruption of 1843 he left in the second schism of 1847, at the creation of the United Presbyterian Church of Scotland.

In 1870 he was elected a Fellow of the Royal Society of Edinburgh his proposer being John Hutton Balfour.

In 1900 the United Presbyterian Church merged with the bulk of the congregations of the Free Church of Scotland to create the United Free Church of Scotland.

Thomson died at home, 62 Northumberland Street, a very substantial Georgian townhouse in Edinburgh's Second New Town on 9 February 1901. He is buried in Dean Cemetery in western Edinburgh. The grave is marked by a pale grey granite Celtic cross and lies in the first northern extension of the cemetery, near the north path.

Both of Thompson's churches survive but both are now in secular use: the Lothian Road Church is now the Edinburgh Filmhouse; the Broughton Place Church is an auction house.

== Family ==
He was married to Margaret Cleland Buchanan (d.1898).

== Publications ==
- Life of John Owen, D.D. (1853)
- Great Missionaries vol 1 : a series of biographies (1862)
- Life of Principal Harper (1882)
- Great Missionaries vol 2 : a series of biographies (1870)
- Historical sketch of the origin of the Secession Church 1848
- The Life of Dr. Owen
- The Sabbath - a History (1863)
- Sketches of Scripture Characters (circa 1867)
- Home life in ancient Palestine: or, Studies in the Book of Ruth (1877)
- In the Holy Land - 1875
- Discourses - 1868
- Samuel Rutherford 1884
- James Darling: a memorial sketch 1891
- In the Holy land: A Journey Through Palestine 1894
- The New Acts of the Apostles, Or, The Marvels of Modern Missions: A Series of Lectures Upon the ...
- Thomas Boston of Ettrick : his life and times (1895)

== Artistic recognition ==
He was painted by Sir Henry Raeburn in 1827.
