= James King Hewison =

Scottish minister and historian

- Church: Church of Scotland

Personal details
- Born: August 2, 1853
- Died: 1941 Thornhill
- Denomination: Church of Scotland
- Occupation: minister
- Education: University of Edinburgh

James King Hewison was a church of Scotland minister and author.

== Early life ==
James King Hewison was born in Morton Schoolhouse, Dumfriesshire, on 2 August 1853. He was the son of Alexander Louttit Hewison, F.E.I.S., and Elizabeth King. He was educated at Morton School and at the University of Edinburgh (MA., 1874) and the University of Leipzig. He worked as a tutor in the family of the Right Hon. W. P. Adam, Governor - General of Madras.

== Church career ==
James King Hewison was licensed by the Presbytery of Edinburgh on 15 May 1879 becoming assistant in Park Parish, Glasgow. He was subsequently ordained to Stair on 15 September 1881. He was translated and admitted to Rothesay on 8 January 1884. He obtained his doctorate, a D.D. from Edinburgh in 1900. He was appointed Grand Chaplain of Freemasons of Scotland and also Provincial Grand Chaplain of Argyll and the Isles. He was also chaplain to 4th Highland Mountain Brigade, R.G.A.

== Publications ==
- Geography of the County of Dumfries (Glasgow, 1875)
- Certain Tractates . . . by Ninian Winzet, 2 vols. (Scot. Text Socy., Edinburgh, 1888)
- The Isle of Bute in the Olden Time, 2 vols. (Edinburgh, 1895)
- The Covenanters, 2 vols. (Glasgow, 1908)
- Dumfriesshire (Cambridge, 1912)
- The Runic Roods of Ruthwell and Bewcastle (Glasgow, 1914)

== Pamphlets ==
- The Covenanters, and what Scotland owes to Them (Rothesay, 1899)
- The Civil and Ecclesiastical Law of the Lord's Day in Scotland (1902)
- The Romance of Dumfriesshire (Dumfries, 1909)
- The Mysterious Cynewulf (Dumfries, 1912)
- The Teind System (1917)
- The Runic Roods of Ruthwell and Bewcastle (Dumfries, 1921)
- Many contributions to magazines, newspapers, and Proceedings of Society of Antiquaries of Scotland.

== Works ==
- The Isle of Bute in the Olden Time (1895) v.1 v.2
- Dumfriesshire (1912)
- The Covenanters: A History of the Church in Scotland from the Reformation to the Revolution (1913) v.1 v.2
- The runic roods of Ruthwell and Bewcastle, with a short history of the cross and crucifix in Scotland (1914)
- Edited Certain Tractates: Together with the Book of Four Score Three Questions by Ninian Winzet
- “Winzet, Ninian,” in Dictionary of National Biography, London: Smith, Elder, & Co. (1885–1900) in 63 vols.
