= Alexander Smellie =

Scottish Presbyterian minister (1857–1923)

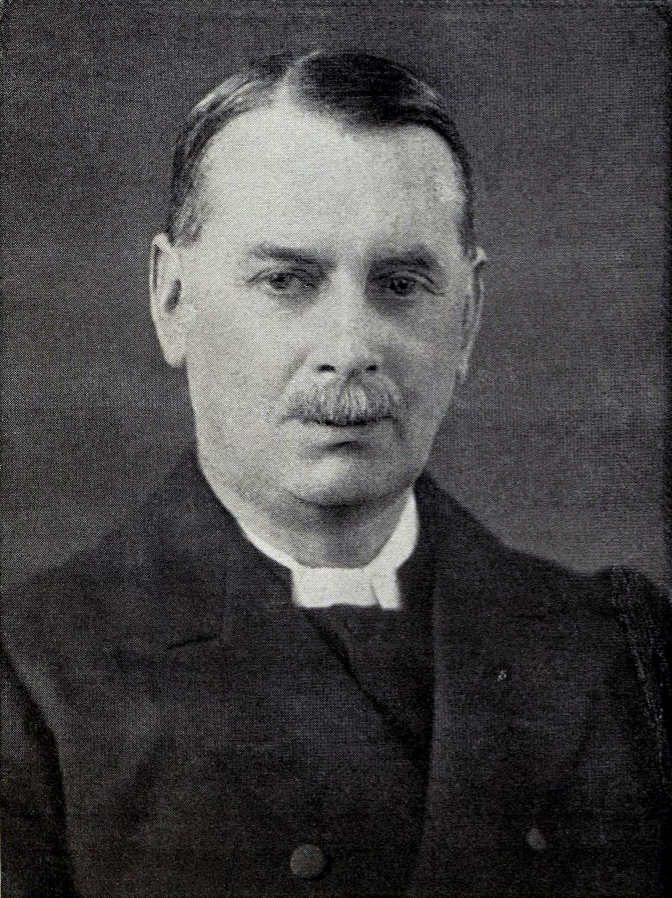
- Alexander Smellie

Personal details
- Born: 30 August 1856 Stranraer, Scotland
- Died: 23 May 1923 (aged 66) Carluke
- Buried: Inch New Parish Churchyard

Alexander Smellie (1857–1923) was a Scottish Presbyterian minister and writer, best known for his 1903 work Men of the Covenant, about the Covenanters.

Smellie was born in Stranraer and after studying at the University of Edinburgh he returned to Stranraer in 1880 where he served as minister of the Original Secession Church. He lived in London from 1892 to 1894, where he worked as editor of the Sunday School Chronicle, but then returned to Scotland and pastored congregations in Thurso and Carluke.
