= John Leyden =

Scottish orientalist, translator and folklorist (1775–1811)

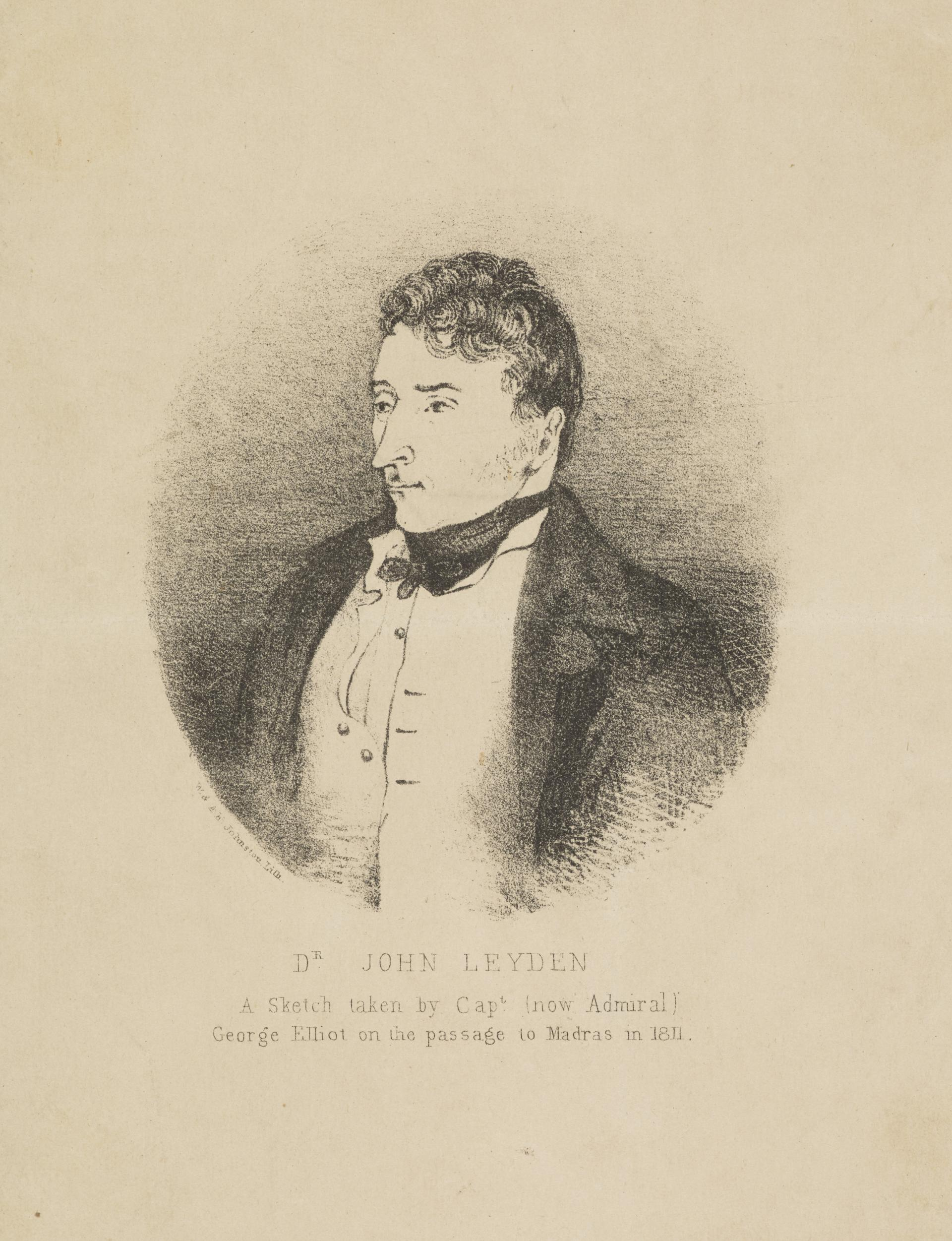
Portrait of Dr. John Leyden by W. and A.K. Johnston, National Galleries of Scotland

John Caspar Leyden (8 September 1775 – 28 August 1811) was a Scottish poet, indologist and folklorist.

== Biography ==
Leyden was born at Denholm on the River Teviot, not far from Hawick. His father, a shepherd, had contrived to send him to Edinburgh University to study for the ministry. Leyden was a diligent but somewhat haphazard student, apparently reading everything except theology, for which he seems to have had no taste. Though he completed his divinity course, and in 1798 was licensed to preach from the presbytery of St Andrews, it soon became clear that the pulpit was not his vocation.

In 1794, Leyden formed an acquaintance with Dr Robert Anderson, editor of The British Poets, and of The Literary Magazine. It was Anderson who later introduced him to Dr Alexander Murray, and Murray, probably, who led him to the study of Eastern languages. They became warm friends and generous rivals, though Leyden excelled, perhaps, in the rapid acquisition of new tongues and acquaintance with their literature, while Murray was the more scientific philologist.

Through Anderson also he came to know Richard Heber, by whom he came to the notice of Walter Scott, who was then collecting materials for his Minstrelsy of the Scottish Border (1802). Leyden was admirably fitted for helping in this kind of work, for he was a borderer himself, and an enthusiastic lover of old ballads and folklore. Scott tells how, on one occasion, Leyden walked 40 miles to get the last two verses of a ballad, and returned at midnight, singing it all the way with his loud, harsh voice, to the wonder and consternation of the poet and his household.

Other work on Scottish customs includes the editing of the 16th-century tract The Complaynt of Scotland, adding an essay exploring Scottish folk music and customs, printing a volume of Scottish descriptive poems, and nearly finishing his Scenes of Infancy, a diffuse poem based on border scenes and traditions. Leyden meanwhile compiled a work on the Discoveries and Settlements of Europeans in Northern and Western Africa, suggested by Mungo Park's travels. He also made some translations from Persian and Arabic poetry.

At last his friends got him an appointment in India on the medical staff, for which he qualified by a year's hard work. In 1803, he sailed for Madras, and took his place in the general hospital there. He was promoted to be naturalist to the commissioners going to survey Mysore. In 1807, he was appointed Magistrate of the 24 Parganas under the patronage of Lord Minto, Governor of India. In 1808, his knowledge of the languages of India procured him an appointment as professor of Hindustani in the College of Fort William in Calcutta. He soon after resigned for a judgeship, and that again to be Commissioner of the Court of Requests in 1808, a post which required a familiarity with several Eastern languages.

In October 1805, Leyden arrived in Penang (also known as Prince of Wales Island) to recuperate following an illness. It was there that he made the acquaintance of Stamford Raffles, then the Assistant Secretary under the Honorable Philip Dundas, the governor of Penang. For the rest of his stay in Penang, Leyden took up residence in Raffles’ home and was enamoured with Olivia Raffles, dedicating his poems “Christmas in Penang” and “Dirge of the Departed Year” to her. The latter poem is notable for its early usage of the word "Malaya" to refer to the Malay Peninsula. Leyden and Raffles shared a common interest in Eastern languages, and it was during this brief stay that Leyden worked on an English translation of the Malay Annals, which was posthumously published with an introduction by Raffles in 1821.

He would continue his correspondence with Raffles after leaving the island on 17 January 1806. While in Calcutta, Leyden recommended Raffles to Lord Minto, later setting into motion the events of the British invasion of Java in 1811. In his letter to Olivia Raffles, dated 22 October 1810, he revealed that he had been promoted to the position of Assay Master at the Calcutta Mint. He had also settled with Raffles he would be appointed Secretary when Raffles was the Governor of Java.

In 1811, Leyden joined Lord Minto and Stamford Raffles in the expedition to Java. Having entered a library which was said to contain many Eastern manuscripts, without having the place aired, he was seized with Batavian fever (possibly malaria or dengue) and died, after three days' illness, on 28 August 1811. He was buried on the island, underneath a small firefly colony, which remains as his tombstone to this day.

Leyden has importance for the Punjab and the Sikh community. Recently surfaced manuscripts in the British Library show he translated Punjabi works into English. These have been commented on and discussed by Sikh historian Gurinder Singh Mann from Leicester, UK. The Panjab Cultural Association created the website www.drleyden.co.uk and a booklet regarding the project in November 2011.

The manuscript of Leyden's Journal of a Tour in the Highlands and Western Islands of Scotland in 1800 was published posthumously in 1903. It was edited, with a comprehensive bibliography of Leyden's works and manuscripts, by the antiquary James Sinton.

== Works ==
- Memoirs of Zehir-Ed-Din Muhammed Babur, emperor of Hindustan
- Scenes of Infancy: Descriptive of Teviotdale (1803)

=== Translations ===
- Leyden, John (1821), Malay Annals (translated from the Malay language), Longman, Hurst, Rees, Orme and Brown
- Malay Annals, Translated from the Malay Language By... John Leyden...

=== Memoirs ===
- The Poetical Remains of the Late Dr. John Leyden,: With Memoirs of His Life, By John Leyden, James Morton
- The poetical remains of the late Dr. John Leyden, : with memoirs of his life, (1819)
- The poetical remains of the late Dr. John Leyden, : with memoirs of his life, (1819)
- The Poetical Works of Dr. John Leyden (1875)
- The poetical remains of the late Dr. John Leyden, with memoirs of his life (1819)

== See also ==
- List of 18th-century British working-class writers
