= Alexander Murray (linguist) =

Scottish minister and philologist

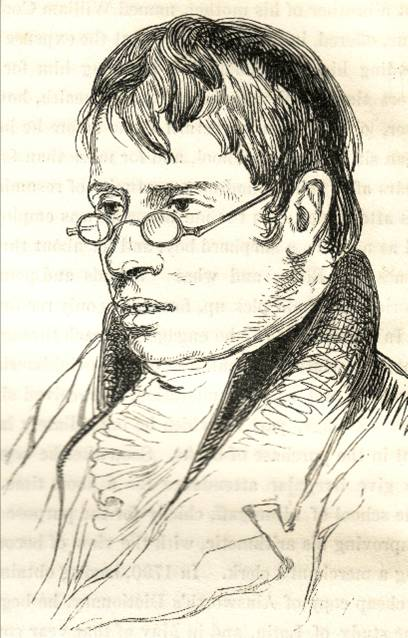
Alexander Murray

Alexander Murray FRSE FSA (Scot) (1775 – 15 April 1813) was a Scottish minister, philologist, linguist and professor of Hebrew and Semitic languages at Edinburgh University (1812).

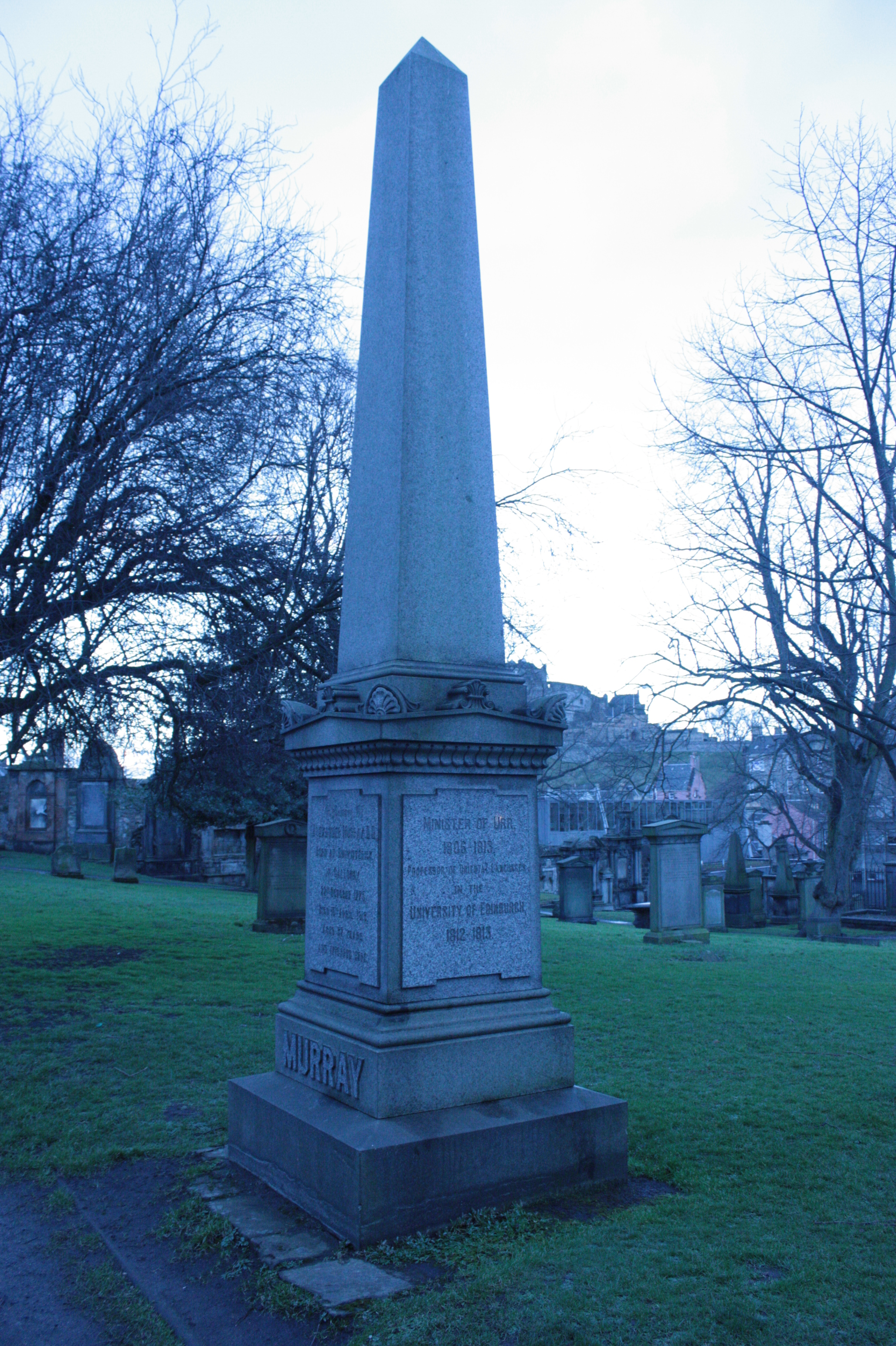
The grave of Prof Alexander Murray, Greyfriars Kirkyard, Edinburgh

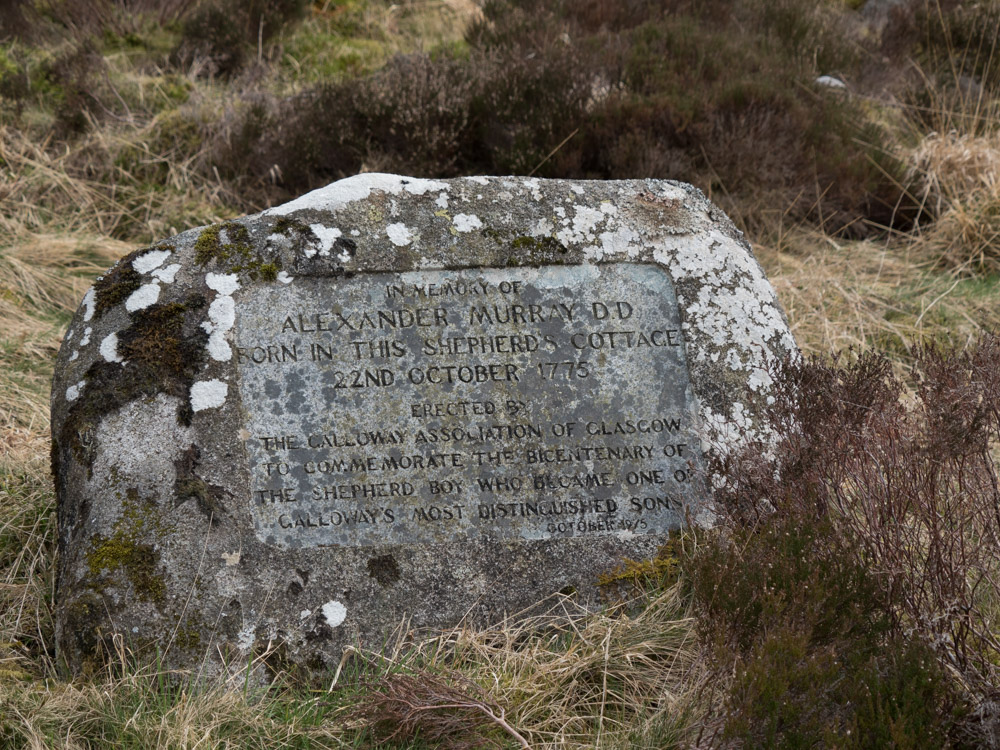
Memorial at Alexander Murray's birthplace erected in 1975

== Life ==
Murray was born on 22 October 1775, at Dunkitterick, Kirkcudbrightshire, where his father, Robert Murray, was a shepherd and farm labourer.

Up until 1792, he had had little more than a year at school, but was self-taught in languages, and had worked as a tutor as well as a shepherd. He translated Arnold Drackenburg's German lectures on Roman authors, and when he visited Dumfries with his version in 1794, after unsuccessfully offering it to two separate publishers, he met Robert Burns, who gave him advice.

The father of Robert Heron lent Murray books, and James M'Harg, a literary pedlar from Edinburgh, proposed that Murray should visit the university authorities. His parish minister, J. G. Maitland of Minnigaff, gave him an introductory letter to Principal George Husband Baird, which led to an examination. Admitted to Edinburgh University as a deserving student, Murray won his way in class and by private teaching. Completing the course, he became a licentiate of the church of Scotland.

Murray early formed the acquaintance of John Leyden, and among his friends were Robert Anderson, Henry Brougham, Francis Jeffrey, Thomas Brown, and Thomas Campbell. In 1806, Murray was appointed assistant to James Murehead parish minister of Urr, Kirkcudbrightshire, whom he succeeded on his death in 1808.

In 1811 Murray translated, with approbation, a letter for George III, brought home by Henry Salt the Abyssinian envoy. It was from the Tigray Region, where Tigrinya is spoken. On 13 August 1811, Murray wrote to the publisher Archibald Constable that he had mastered the Lappish tongue. In July 1812, after a sharp contest involving some bitterness of feeling, Murray was appointed professor of oriental languages in Edinburgh University, with support from Salt and Constable. He received from the university on 17 July the degree of doctor of divinity.

Murray entered on his work at the end of October 1812, publishing Outlines of Oriental Philology (1812), for the use of his students. He lectured through the winter, against his strength, attracting both students and literary men to his room. His health completely gave way in the spring, and he died of consumption in Edinburgh, 15 April 1813.

He is buried in Greyfriars Kirkyard in Edinburgh, immediately north of the church.

Murray's Monument, an eighty-foot stone obelisk to his memory, was erected near his birthplace in 1835, and it received an inscription in 1877. It is north of the A712 road between Newton Stewart and New Galloway, in the Galloway Forest Park.

== Artistic recognition ==
His portrait by Andrew Geddes, formerly in the possession of Archibald Constable, went to the Scottish National Portrait Gallery, Edinburgh.

== Works ==
Through Leyden, Murray became a contributor to the Scots Magazine, and he edited the seven numbers of that periodical from February 1802, inserting verses of his own under the signatures "B",' "X", or "Z". For three successive numbers he wrote a biography of James Bruce traveller, which he later expanded into a volume (1808). Constable the publisher then engaged him in September 1802 to prepare a new edition of Bruce's Travels. At the same period (1802–5) Murray worked for the Edinburgh Review

Murray's early promise then faded, but he was an influential editor and biographer. His major work, the History of the European Languages, or Researches into the Affinities of the Teutonic, Greek, Celtic, Slavonic, and Indian Nations, was edited by David Scot, and published, with a detailed Life, by Sir Henry Wellwood Moncreiff, in 2 vols., 1823.

To the Edinburgh Review of 1803 Murray contributed a review of Charles Vallancey's Prospectus of an Irish Dictionary; to the number for January 1804 he furnished an article on James Stanier Clarke's Progress of Maritime Discovery; and in January 1805 he discussed Thomas Maurice's History of Hindostan. His Letters to Charles Stuart, M.D., appeared in 1813. He figures as a lyrist on his "Native Vale" in Malcolm McLachlan Harper's Bards of Galloway.

== Family ==
Murray married, 9 December 1808, Henrietta Affleck, daughter of a parishioner. At his death he left her a widow, with a son and daughter.; she survived about twelve years, supported by a government pension of £80, which had been granted to her in return for Murray's translation of the Abyssinian letter. The daughter died of consumption in 1821, and the son, who was practically adopted by Archibald Constable, qualified for a ship surgeon, and was drowned on his first voyage.
