= Bo'ness witches =

The Witches of Bo'ness were a group of women accused of witchcraft in Bo'ness, Scotland in the late 17th century and ultimately executed for this crime. Among the more famous cases noted by historians, in 1679, Margaret Pringle, Bessie Vickar, Annaple Thomsone, and two women both called Margaret Hamilton were all accused of being witches, alongside "warlock" William Craw. The case of these six was "one of the last multiple trials to take place for witchcraft" in Scotland.

== Historical context ==
During the early modern period in Europe (16th and 17th centuries), accusations, adjudications, and executions of presumed witches were a somewhat commonplace phenomenon, resulting in the violent early deaths of tens of thousands of people, most of them women. Scotland could be said to have been especially active in this regard. Witch hunts occurred during a period of civil strife and social upheavals associated with religious politics in the Protestant church (see: Scottish religion in the seventeenth century, The Killing Time). Indeed, prosecution of witches, scholars suggest, should be conceived of not "in isolation, but should be measured against a wider cultural picture of social control and discipline" (103) (see also: Witchcraft Acts).

Scholars note that certain years exhibited "noticeable peaks" in witch-hunting activity, including 1679 and 1680. Twenty-eight suspects were tried for witchcraft in those two years in the Bo'ness area alone, including the aforementioned six, who were tried together in November 1679.

== Trial, confession, and execution ==
Margaret Pringle, Bessie Vickar, Annaple Thomsone, and two women both called Margaret Hamilton were tried in November 1679 for witchcraft. They were ultimately found guilty and put to death by local authorities. They confessed a variety of transgressions. All were widows and unmarried at the time.

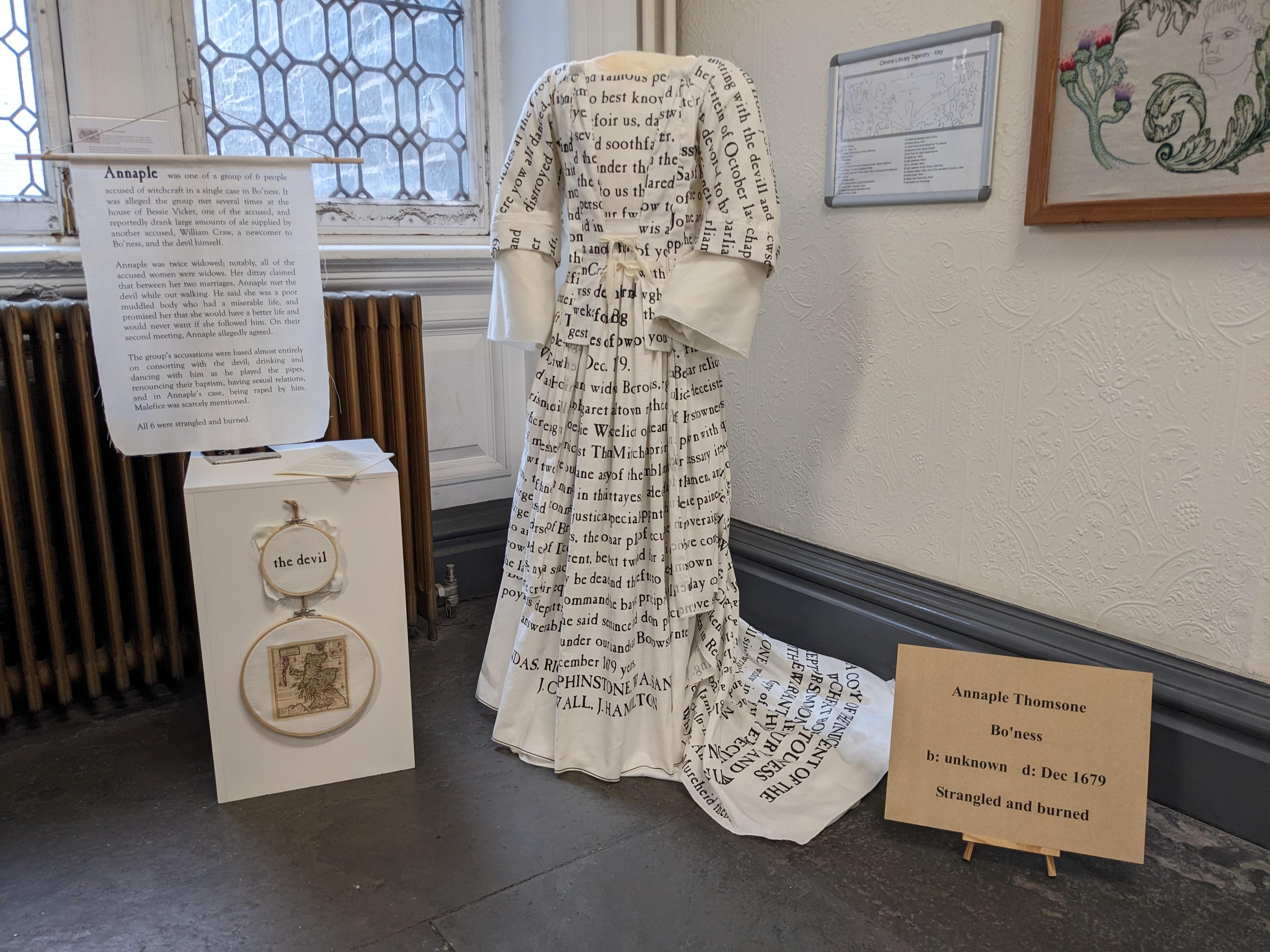
Annaple Thomsone display at Witches in Word, Not Deed exhibition by Carolyn Sutton

Annaple Thomson was widowed twice by the time of her trial. She confessed that she was promised a better life by the devil should she enter his service; Satan was allegedly sympathetic to her "poore" and "difficult" life (135). She would host other women at her house regularly where, allegedly, the devil supplied music, sex, and ale. The women were all said to be drunken and libidinous and to have formed a Demonic Pact. Another of the women, one of the Margaret Hamiltons, confessed she met the devil in the form of a black dog and admitted to being in his service for three decades by the time of the trial (133). Historian Lizanne Henderson explains:

The Devil was not an abstract concept, trapped within the pages of the Bible, but could assume corporeal form. He prowled the streets, day and night, and could appear in any shape or disguise of his choosing. He may have spoken to you on your way to market, or entered your home with or without your knowledge. It was not important to actually see the Devil, as he could also enter your thoughts. Nurtured with such high levels of anxiety, it is not difficult to understand how the seeds of witch belief could blossom into full-scale witch persecution (103).

The case of the six was adjudicated locally, and, on 23 December 1679, Margaret Pringle, Bessie Vickar, Annaple Thomsone, and the two Margaret Hamiltons were executed, strangled with wire and burned at the stake.

One analysis considers this case "all the more horrifying for the fact that those who were charged and executed had comparatively little charged against them in the way of malefice". However, another interpretation describes the Bo'ness confessions of 1679–1680 as "notable for their high demonic content".

A "Witches Stone" stands near Carriden House in Bo'ness, and serves as commemoration of this and other witch trials that took place in the area.

In 2023 there was an exhibition of thirteen figures, Witches in Words, not Deeds, created by Carolyn Sutton. Thomsone was one of the figures exhibited at Edinburgh's Central Library.

== See also ==
- Witchcraft Acts
- Janet Horne
- Witch trials in the early modern period
