= Annaple Thomsone =

- Died: 23 December 1679
- Known for: Accused witch in 17th century Bo'ness area

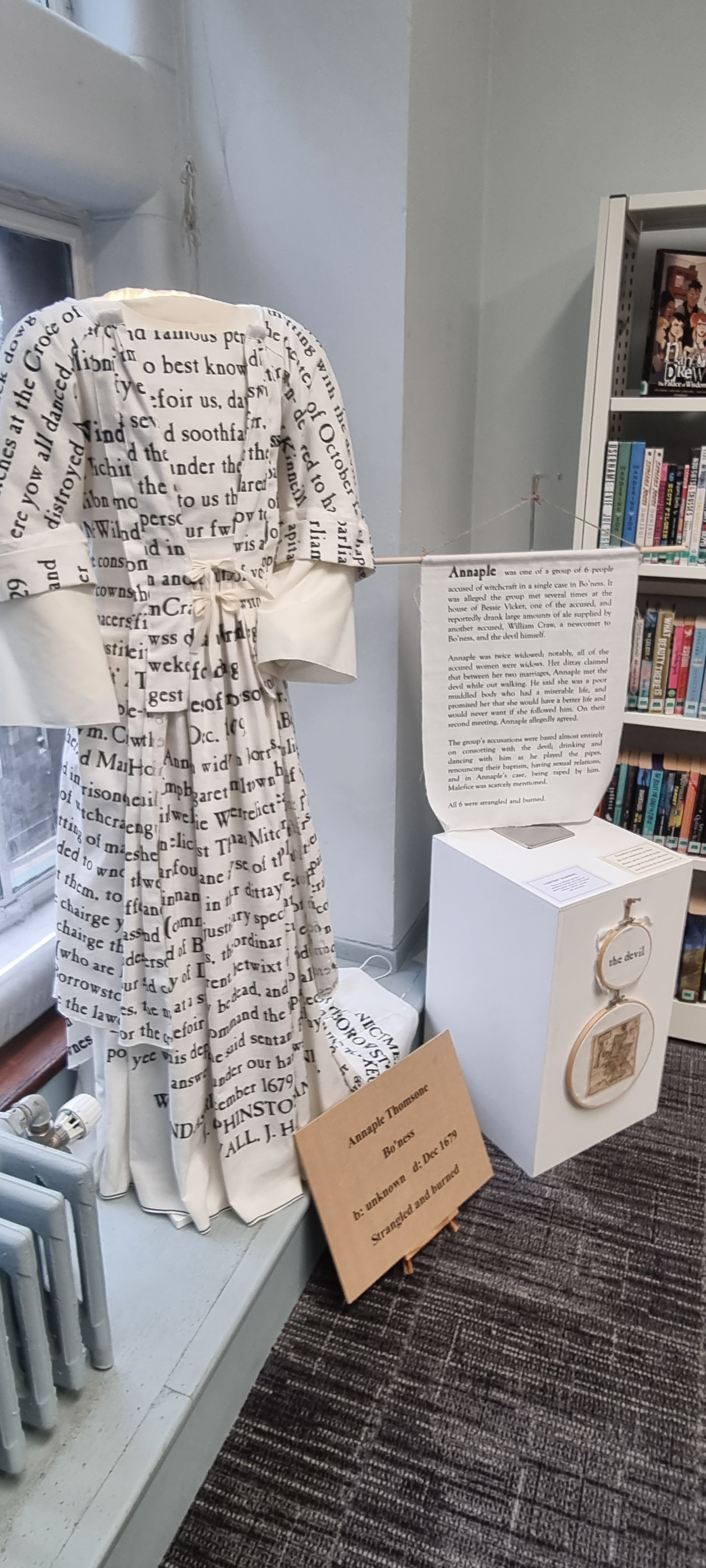
Dress with words that condemned Annaple Thomsone at Edinburgh Central Library as part of the Witches in Word not Deed exhibition by Carolyn Sutton (2023).

Annaple Thomsone, also known as Annabel Thomson and Annaple Thomson (died 23 Dec 1679), was accused and tried for being a witch in Bo'ness, Scotland. She was part of a group known as the Witches of Bo'ness. She was subsequently strangled with wire and burnt for witchcraft in December 1679.

== Biography ==
Annaple Thomsone was widowed twice by the time of her trial on 11 November 1679. Demonic pacts and malefice were mentioned in the details of the commission. Annaple was sent to Tolbooth prison, Bo'ness, Linlithgow. In December 1679 she was strangled and burnt for witchcraft along with Margaret Pringle, two women named Margaret Hamilton, William Craw and Bessie Vicker. She was also mentioned in the trial of Margaret Comb and Agnes Stewart.

== Legacy ==
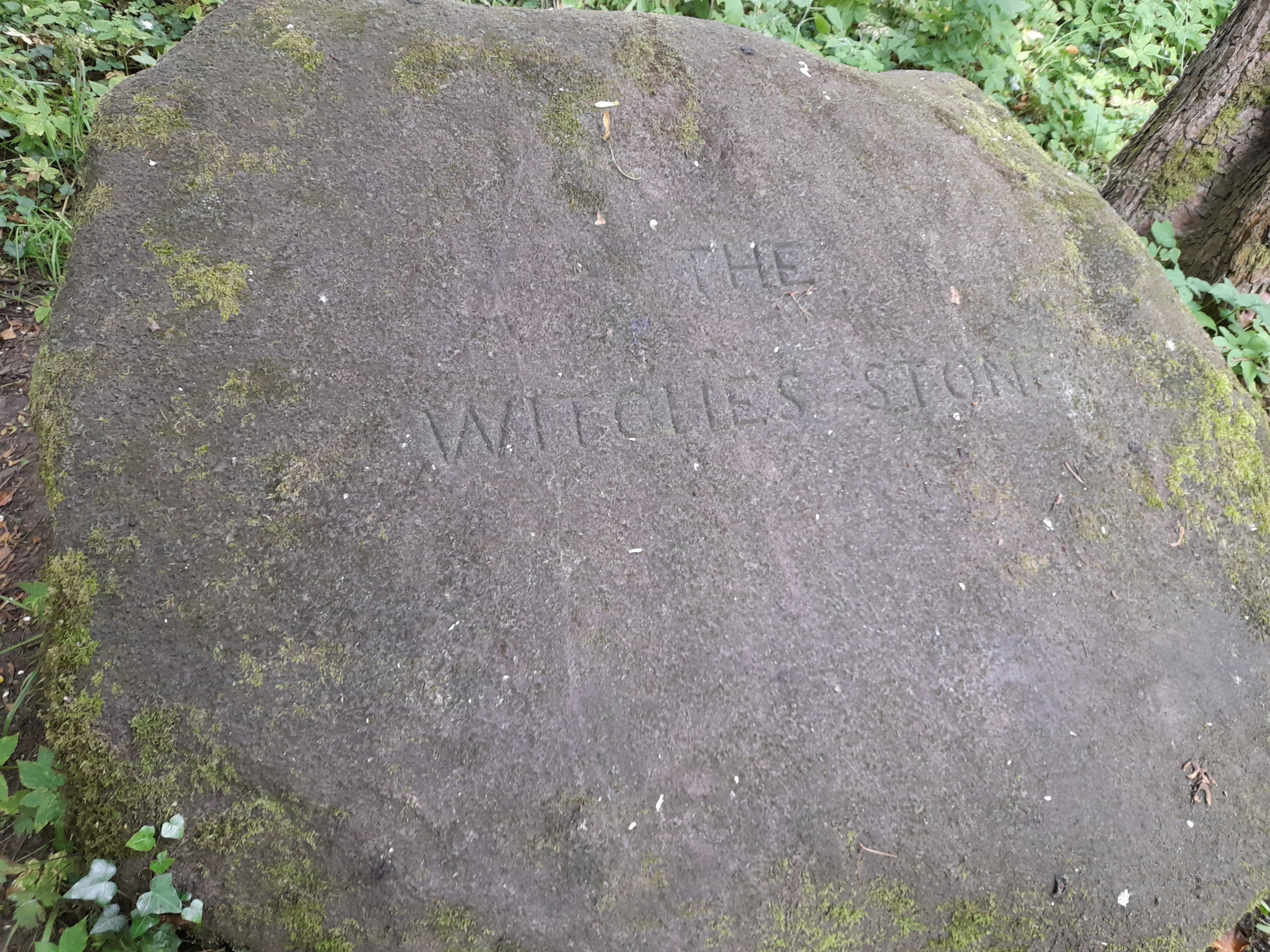
The Witches Stone in Bo'ness

Annaple was one of thirteen accused witches, memorialised in an exhibition in 2023 Witches in Words, not Deeds, created by Carolyn Sutton, MLIS, AA. Watsone was one of the figures exhibited at Edinburgh's Central Library from September to November 2023. The artist had made her dress of white linen imprinted with the words that condemned her.

A "Witches Stone" stands near Carriden House in Bo'ness, and serves as commemoration of this and other witch trials that took place in the area.
