= Rescissory Act 1661 =

Scottish act

- Act of Parliament
- Parliament of Scotland
- Long title: Act rescinding and annulling the pretendit Parliaments in the yeers 1640, 1641 &c.
- Citation: 1661 c. 12 [12mo ed: 1661 c. 15]

Dates
- Royal assent: 28 March 1661

The Rescissory Act 1661 or Act rescinding and annulling the pretended parliaments in the years 1640, 1641 etc. was added to the Scottish Parliamentary register on the 28 March 1661. At one stroke, it annulled the legislation of 1640–1648 (and in effect the legislation of all parliaments since 1633), covering the time of the Wars of the Three Kingdoms and the Commonwealth. This parliament was sometimes known disparagingly as the "Drunken Parliament".

== Legislation ==
The idea of the Act Rescissory was first mentioned as a joke among the Lords of the Articles, and was afterwards agreed to at a meeting when few of them were sober. Sir George Mackenzie of Tarbet, known as the "passionate cavalier", was loudest supporter for the Act Rescissory.

This was "a general act rescissory", that is, an act rescinding every proceeding of all the "pretended parliaments", conventions, committees, etc., since the commencement of the troubles (1633) in Scotland, with the coronation of Charles I at St Giles Cathedral in Edinburgh that year, and the subsequent Bishops' Wars. It was objected that two of these parliaments were sanctioned by the presence respectively of the late and present King. John Middleton, 1st Earl of Middleton, Lord High Commissioner to the Parliament of Scotland replied that, in both cases, the King was not morally a free agent; and an act which obliterated at once the legislation of several years, and vested the government of the kingdom in church and state almost absolutely in the King, was carried with only thirty dissidents. This extravagant Act was followed by a recess of some weeks. Meanwhile, the King issued his proclamation for restoring church government by Bishops in Scotland, and the newly appointed Scottish prelates having received ordination from Sheldon, Bishop of London, in Westminster Abbey, went back to Scotland to take the government of the Kirk, and their places in the Scottish Parliament. It appears to have been directly due to the reactionary enthusiasm of the Restoration Parliament itself.

== Effect on the Episcopacy and Presbyterianism ==
This act virtually meant a return to Episcopacy, so that monarchy and Episcopacy came back together. After bishops had been procured, consecrated, and seated in the Scottish Parliament, severities increased steadily against the Presbyterians, who formed the majority of the population, especially in the centre and south and west of Scotland.

One result of the Rescissory Act was that all the ministers who obtained livings from 1649 to 1661 were held not to have been appointed at all, and therefore were at once thrust out of their jobs. They numbered nearly 400, and their expulsion caused great discontent in Scotland. The extinction of this act brought into operation the old law of 1592, by which the Church courts were bound to induct any minister presented by the Crown or any lay patron; and thus, after an interregnum of 12 years, patronage came into full vigour, and it so continued till after the Revolution of 1688, when it was modified by the Act of 1690.

== See also ==
- Scottish religion in the seventeenth century
- Restoration (Scotland)
