= Scottish religion in the seventeenth century =

Religious organisation and belief in the Kingdom of Scotland in the 17th century

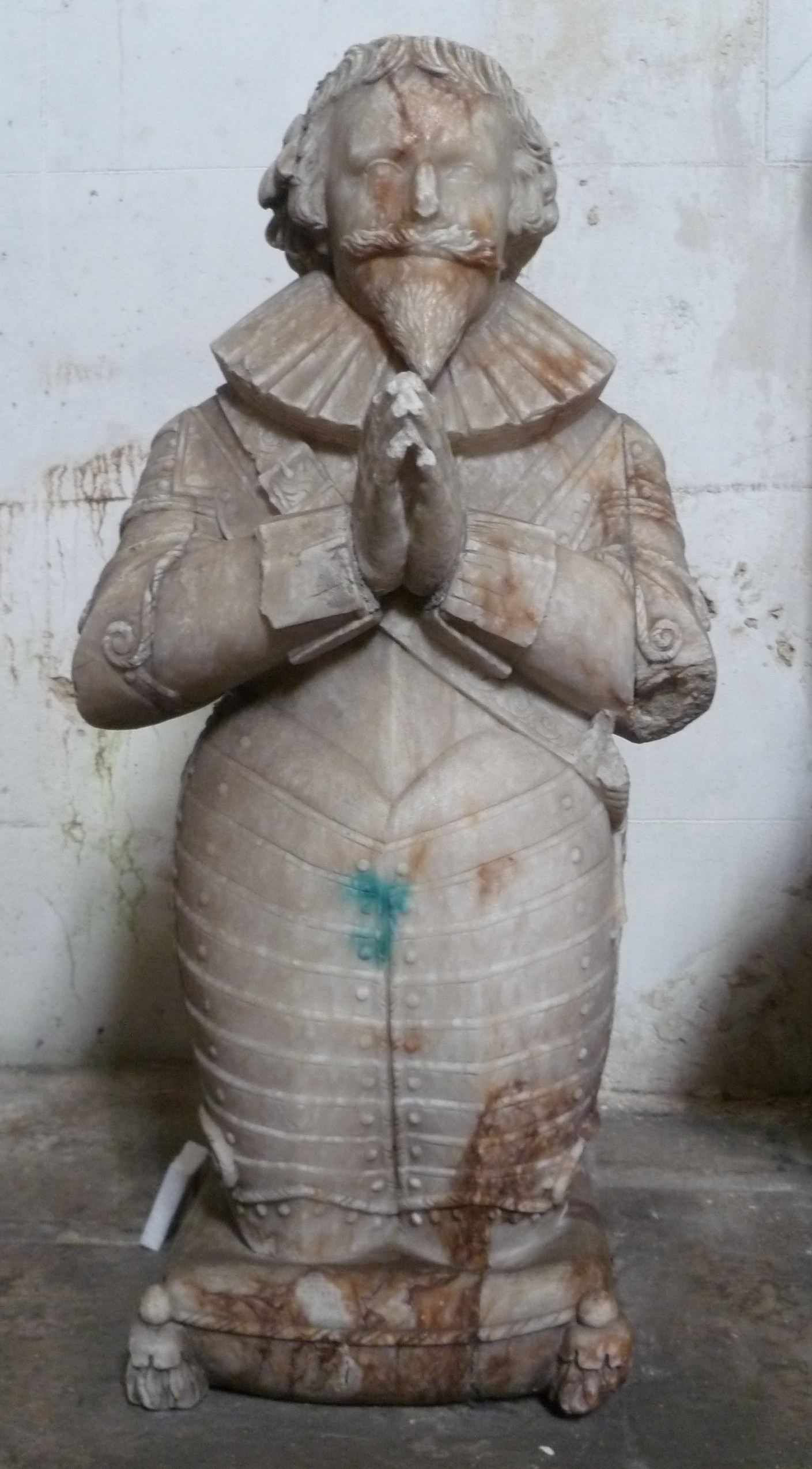
Scottish Protestant at prayer; statue in Culross Abbey

Scottish religion in the seventeenth century includes all forms of religious organisation and belief in the Kingdom of Scotland in the seventeenth century. The 16th century Reformation created a Church of Scotland, popularly known as the kirk, predominantly Calvinist in doctrine and Presbyterian in structure, to which James VI added a layer of bishops in 1584.

While these terms now imply differences in doctrine, in the 17th century Episcopalian meant churches governed by bishops, usually appointed by the monarch; Presbyterian implied rule by Elders, nominated by congregations. By the 1630s, around 90-95% of Scots were members of the church, and despite disagreements on governance, there was general alignment on Calvinist doctrine. In the 17th century, religious disputes were often as much about political principles, due to the assumption 'true religion and true government' were one and the same.

Although both nominally Episcopalian, the Church of England was very different in doctrine and religious practice. This meant attempts by Charles I to impose shared canon laws and a new liturgy, led to the National Covenant. The Covenanters gained control of government after the 1638-1639 Bishop's Wars but then broke into factions. Attempts to consolidate their victory led to Scotland's involvement in the Wars of the Three Kingdoms and after defeat in the Anglo-Scots War of 1649-1651, incorporation into the English Commonwealth.

The 1660 Restoration re-established an Episcopalian structure, but many ministers refused to accept this and held services or conventicles outside the established church. Covenanter risings in 1666 and 1679 led to a more intense phase of persecution known as "the Killing Time" and ended with the deposition of the Catholic James VII in late 1688. In March 1689, his Protestant daughter Mary and her husband William of Orange were accepted as monarchs and the 1690 Settlement permanently removed bishops.

== Background ==
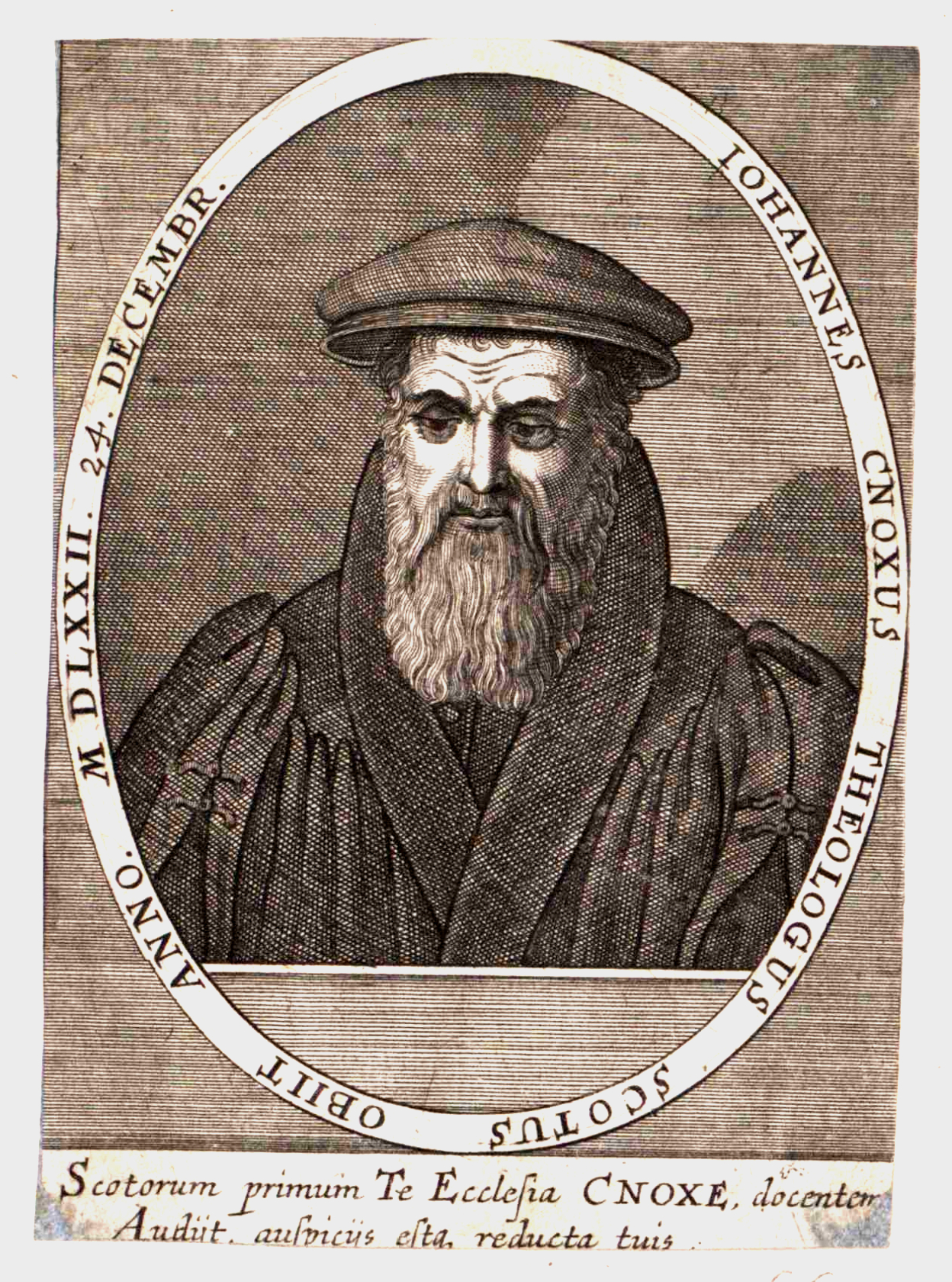
John Knox

The modern use of Presbyterian or Episcopalian implies differences in both governance and doctrine but this was not the case in the 17th and 18th centuries. Episcopalian structures were governed by bishops, usually appointed by the monarch; Presbyterian implied rule by Elders, nominated by their congregations. Arguments over the role of bishops were as much about politics and the power of the monarch as religious practice.

The Protestant Reformation created a Church of Scotland or kirk Presbyterian in structure and governance and predominantly Calvinist in doctrine. The addition of an Episcopalian system in 1584 resulted in a situation where bishops presided over Presbyterian structures, while local lairds or heritors controlled the appointment of clergy in their districts. Tensions between these three power centres drove many of the political and religious conflicts that dominated the 17th century.

In 1567, the Catholic Mary, Queen of Scots was exiled to England, where she was imprisoned and later executed. She was replaced by her one-year-old son James VI who was brought up as a Protestant; by the 1630s, Catholicism was largely restricted to members of the aristocracy and remote Gaelic-speaking areas of the Highlands and Islands.

== 1600 to 1651; Wars of the Three Kingdoms ==
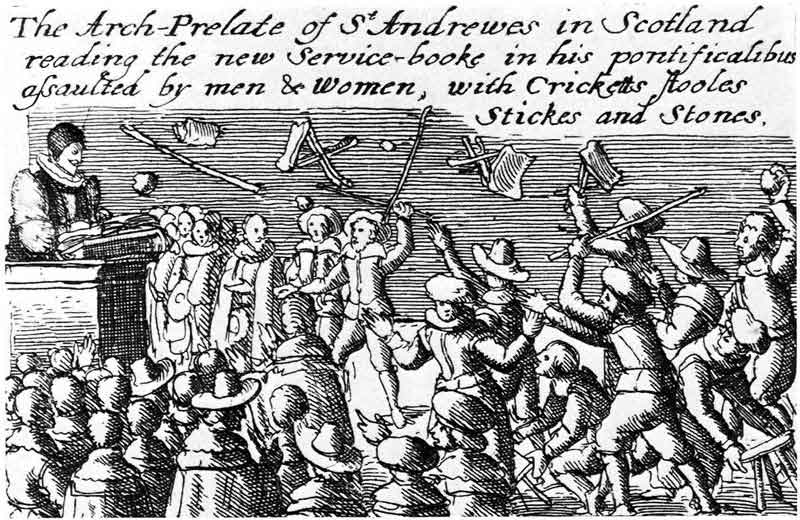
The riots initiated by Jenny Geddes in St Giles Cathedral led to the Bishops' Wars

James claimed his authority as monarch and head of the kirk came from God; when he also became King of England in 1603, a unified Church of Scotland and England governed by bishops became the first step in his vision of a centralised, Unionist state. Although both were nominally Episcopalian, they were very different in governance and doctrine; Scottish bishops were doctrinal Calvinists who viewed many Church of England practices as little better than Catholicism.

Since Calvinists believed a 'well-ordered' monarchy was part of God's plan, the vast majority of Scots agreed monarchy itself was divinely ordered but disagreed on who held ultimate authority in clerical affairs. The Covenanter view was summarised by Andrew Melville as '...Thair is twa Kings and twa Kingdomes in Scotland... Chryst Jesus the King and this Kingdome the Kirk, whose subject King James the Saxt is.' Royalists tended to be 'traditionalists' in religion and politics but there were many other factors, including nationalist allegiance to the kirk and individual motives were very complex.

In 1618, the General Assembly reluctantly approved the Five Articles of Perth; these included forms retained in England but largely abolished in Scotland and were widely resented. When Charles I succeeded James, unfamiliarity with Scotland made him even more reliant on the bishops, especially the Archbishop of St Andrews and prone to sudden decisions. The 1625 Act of Revocation cancelling all grants of land made by the Crown since 1540 was done without consultation and alienated large parts of the Scottish nobility and clergy.

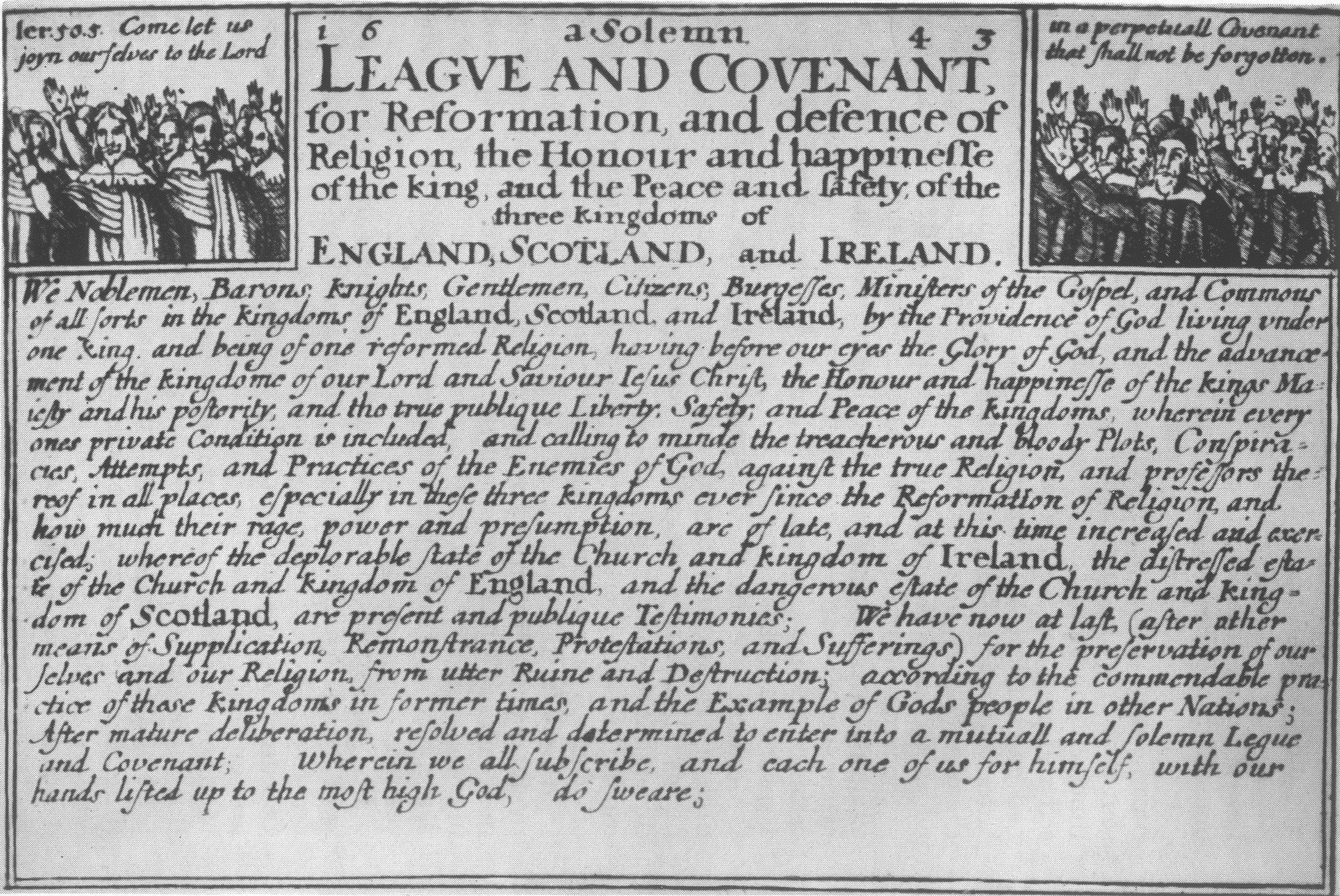
The Solemn League and Covenant agreed by English and Scottish Presbyterians in 1643

Despite the small number of Scottish Catholics, fear of 'Popery' remained widespread, partly due to the close cultural and religious links between Scots and French Huguenots. Increasing restrictions by the French state led to a series of Huguenot rebellions, while many Scots also fought in the 1618 to 1648 Thirty Years' War, a religious conflict that caused an estimated 8 million deaths.

Concerns were heightened when Charles married the Catholic Henrietta Maria of France, then accepted the first Papal envoy since the Reformation. In 1636, John Knox's Book of Discipline was replaced by a new Book of Canons, with the threat of excommunication for anyone who denied the King's supremacy in church matters. Followed in 1637 by a Book of Common Prayer, it led to widespread anger and rioting, allegedly sparked by Jenny Geddes during a service in St Giles Cathedral.

The perception the kirk was under threat prompted representatives from all sections of society to sign a National Covenant on 28 February 1638, objecting to liturgical 'innovations.' Support for the Covenant was widespread except in Aberdeen and Banff, the heartland of Episcopalian resistance for the next 60 years. Argyll and six other members of the Privy Council of Scotland backed the Covenant; in December, the General Assembly expelled bishops from the kirk.

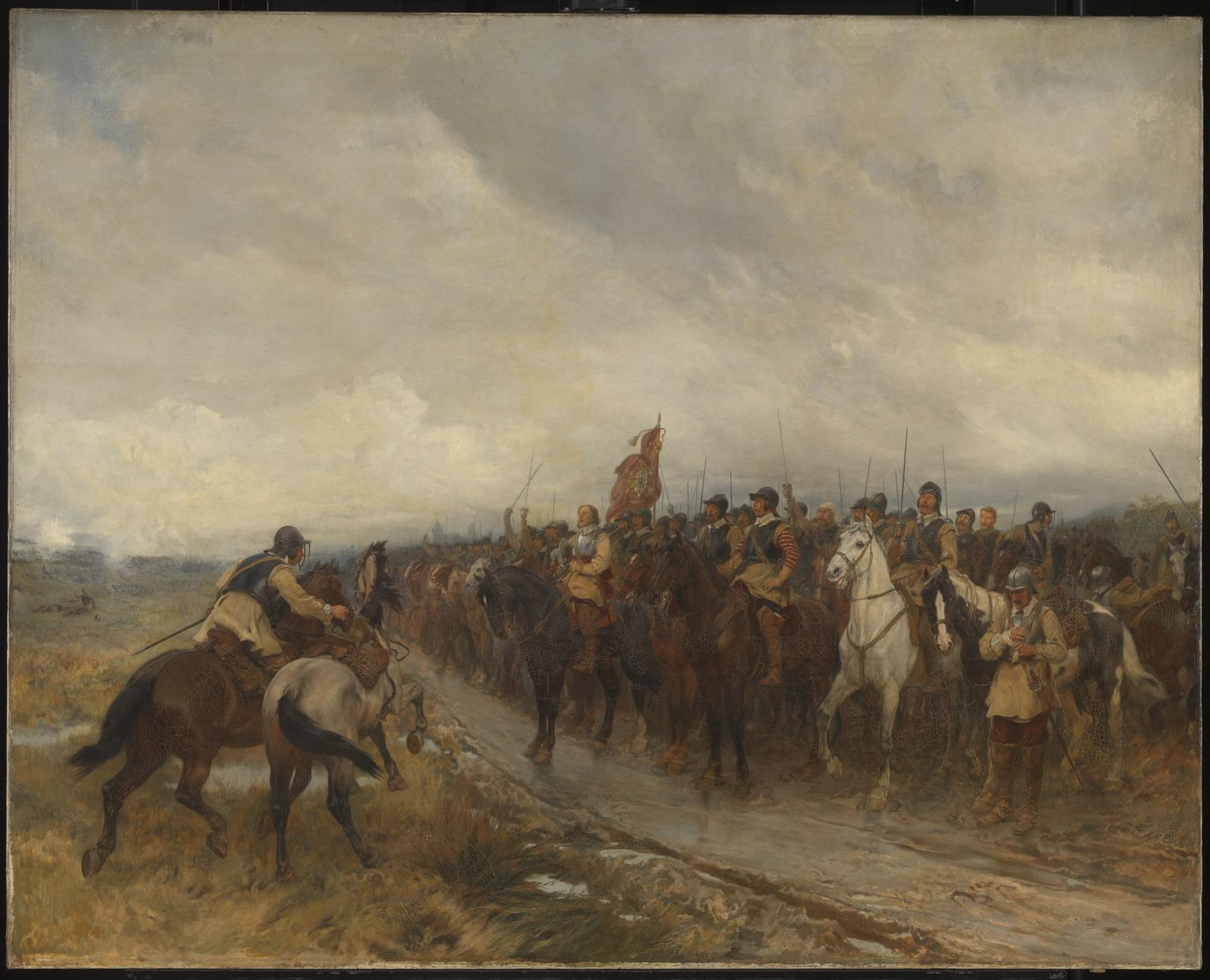
Dunbar, 1650; defeat in the Third English Civil War led to Scotland's incorporation into the Commonwealth.

Charles' efforts to impose his authority led to the 1639 and 1640 Bishop's Wars, in which Covenanter victory left them in control of Scotland. This forced Charles to recall the Parliament of England, which had been suspended since 1629 and ultimately resulted in the outbreak of the First English Civil War in 1642. The Scots remained neutral at first but sent troops to Ulster to support their co-religionists in the Irish Rebellion of 1641; the bitterness of this conflict radicalised views in Scotland and Ireland. Argyll viewed religious and economic union with England as the best way to preserve a Presbyterian kirk; in October 1643, the English Parliament signed the Solemn League and Covenant, agreeing to union in return for Scottish military support.

Royalists and moderates in both Scotland and England opposed this on religious and nationalist grounds, as did the religious Independents like Oliver Cromwell who were against any state-ordered church. The Covenanters and their English allies viewed the Independents who dominated the New Model Army as a bigger threat than the Royalists and when Charles surrendered in 1646, they began negotiations to restore him to the English throne. In December 1647, Charles agreed to impose Presbyterianism in England for three years and suppress the Independents but his refusal to take the Covenant himself split the Covenanters into Engagers and Kirk Party fundamentalists or Whiggamores. Defeat in the Second English Civil War resulted in the execution of Charles in January 1649 and the Kirk Party taking control of the General Assembly.

In February 1649, the Scots proclaimed Charles II King of Scotland and Great Britain; under the terms of the Treaty of Breda, the Kirk Party agreed to restore Charles to the English throne, in return for his acceptance of the Covenant. A Scottish army invaded England but defeat in the Third English Civil War resulted with Scotland's incorporation into the Commonwealth of England, Scotland and Ireland in 1652.

== 1651 to 1660: The Commonwealth ==
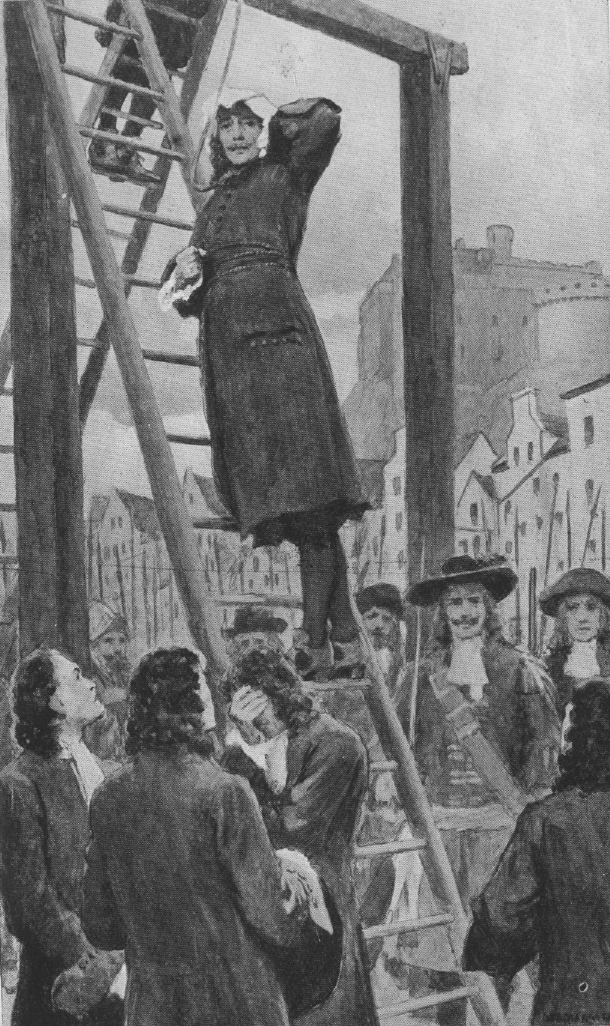
Execution of the Protester James Guthrie in 1661

After defeat in 1651, the kirk split into two factions. Over two-thirds of the ministry supported the Resolution of December 1650 re-admitting Royalists and Engagers and were known as 'Resolutioners.' 'Protestors' were largely former Kirk Party fundamentalists or Whiggamores who blamed defeat on compromise with 'malignants.' Differences between the two were both religious and political, including church government, religious toleration and the role of law in a godly society.

Following the events of 1648-51, Cromwell decided the only way forward was to eliminate the power of the Scottish landed elite and the kirk. In February 1652, a new Council of Scotland was given responsibility for regulating religious affairs, rather than the kirk, and with freedom of worship for all Protestant sects, such as Congregationalists and Quakers. Apart from a small number of Protestors known as Separatists, the vast majority of the kirk would not accept these changes and Scotland was incorporated into the Commonwealth without further consultation on 21 April 1652.

Contests for control of individual presbyteries made the split increasingly bitter and in July 1653 each faction held its own General Assembly in Edinburgh. The English military commander in Scotland Robert Lilburne used the excuse of Resolutioner church services praying for the success of Glencairn's insurrection to dissolve both sessions. No further Assemblies were held until 1690, the Resolutioner majority instead meeting in informal 'Consultations' and Protestors holding field assemblies or Conventicles outside Resolutioner-controlled kirk structures.

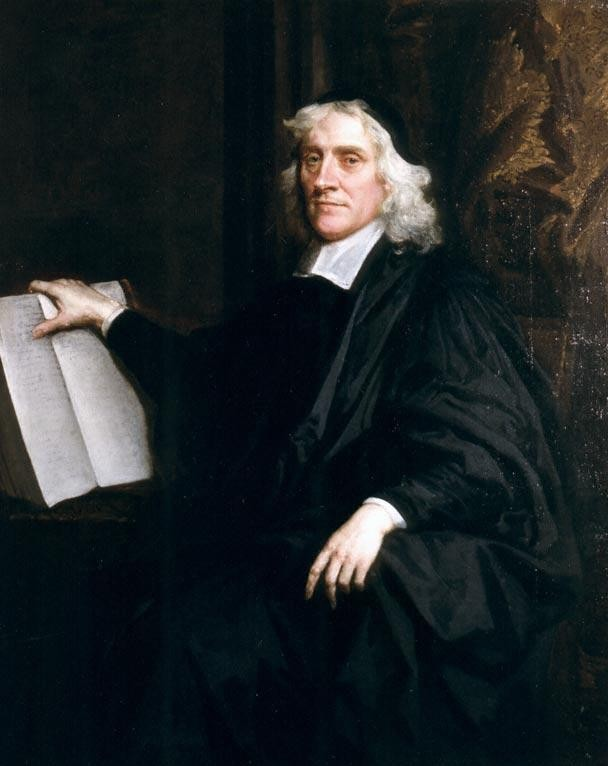
James Sharp, Resolutioner, later Archbishop of St Andrews, murdered in 1679

When the Protectorate was established in 1654, Lord Broghill the head of the Council of State for Scotland summarised his dilemma; 'the Resolutioners love Charles Stuart and hate us, while the Protesters love neither him nor us.' Neither side was willing to co-operate with the Protectorate except in Glasgow where Protestors led by Patrick Gillespie used the authorities in their contest with local Resolutioners. Since the Resolutioners controlled 750 of 900 parishes, Broghill recognised they could not be ignored; his policy was to isolate the 'extreme' elements of both factions and create a new, moderate majority.

Broghill accordingly sought to encourage the kirk's internal divisions, such as having Gillespie appointed Principal of Glasgow University against the wishes of the James Guthrie and Warriston-led Protestor majority. The Protectorate authorities effectively became arbitrators between the factions, each of whom appointed representatives to argue their case in London. The repercussions affected the kirk for decades to come.

While toleration was not formally extended to either Episcopalians or Catholics, they were largely left alone, although the Quakers were the only non-conformists to establish a presence. Attempts were made to convert the largely Catholic, Gaelic-speaking Highlands and Islands to Presbyterianism, with the first Gaelic catechism published in 1653 and the first Psalm book in 1659. This period was later viewed as very positive for religion, since being barred from politics meant ministers spent more time with their congregations and emphasised preaching that emulated the sects.

== 1660 to 1685; Restoration and the Killing Time ==
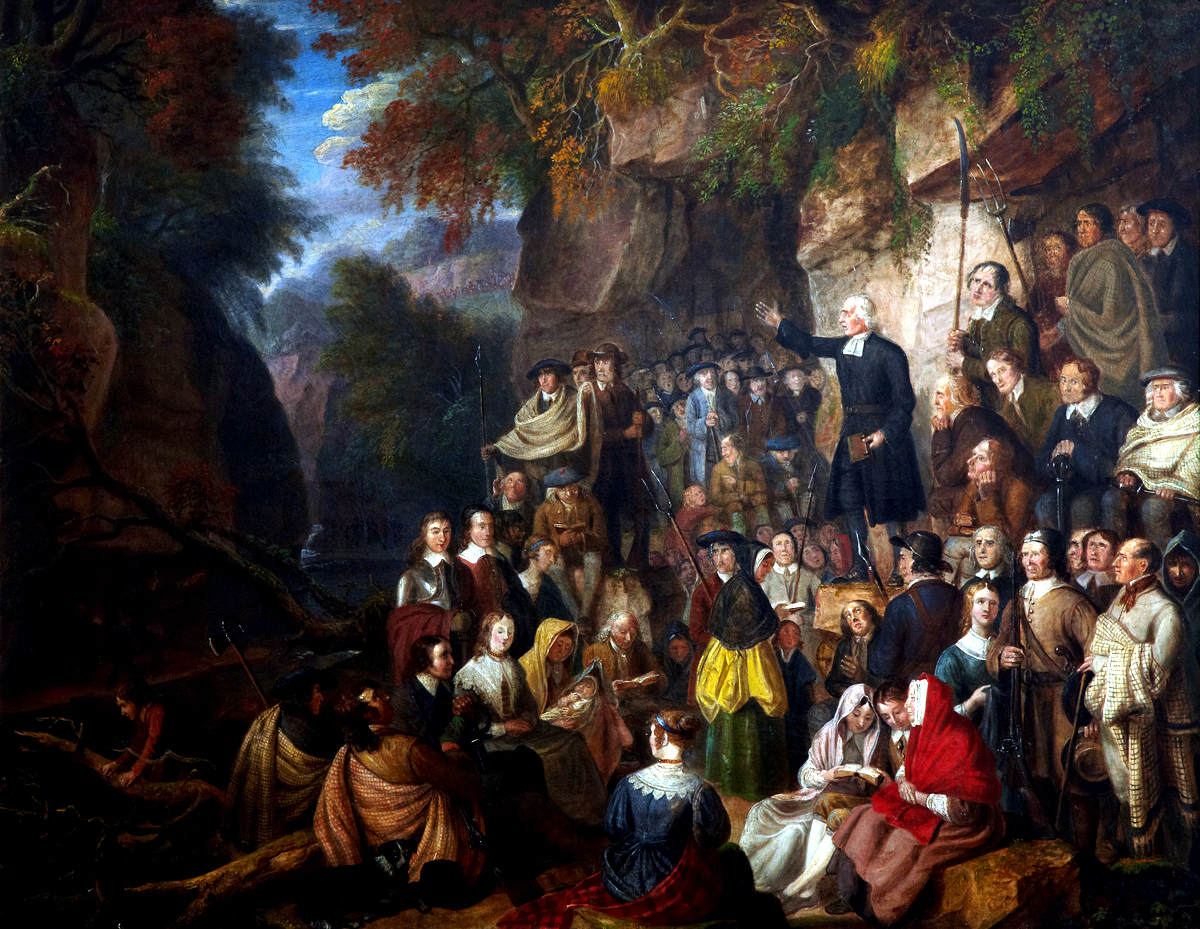
Covenanters in a Glen by Alexander Carse; an illegal field assembly or Conventicle.

After the Restoration of the Monarchy in 1660, Scotland regained control of the kirk, but the Rescissory Act 1661 (c. 126) restored the legal position of 1633. This removed the Covenanter reforms of 1638-1639 although another act of Parliament renewed the ability of kirk sessions, presbyteries and synods to impose civil penalties, suggesting some compromise was possible. The restoration of Episcopacy was proclaimed by the Privy Council of Scotland on 6 September 1661.

James Sharp, who was in London representing the Resolutioners, accepted a position as Archbishop of St Andrews. He was consecrated along with Robert Leighton as Bishop of Dunblane and soon an entire bench of bishops had been appointed. In 1662, the kirk was restored as the national church, independent sects banned and all office-holders were required to renounce the Covenant; about a third, or around 270 in total, lost their positions. Most occurred in the south-west of Scotland, an area particularly strong in its Covenanting sympathies; some took to preaching in the open fields, or conventicles, which often attracted thousands of worshippers.

The government responded by alternating persecution and toleration; in 1663, the Ecclesiastical Authority Act 1663 (c. 9) declared dissenting ministers 'seditious persons' and imposed heavy fines on those who failed to attend the parish churches of the "King's curates". In 1666 a group of men from Galloway captured the government's local military commander and marched on Edinburgh but were defeated at the Battle of Rullion Green. Around 50 prisoners were taken, while a number of others were arrested; 33 were executed and the rest transported to Barbados.

The Rising led to the replacement of the Duke of Rothes as King's Commissioner by John Maitland, 1st Duke of Lauderdale who followed a more conciliatory policy. Letters of Indulgence were issued in 1669, 1672 and 1679, allowing evicted ministers to return to their parishes, if they agreed to avoid politics. A number returned but over 150 refused the offer, while many Episcopalians were alienated by the compromise.

Pre-1660, Glasgow had been a stronghold of the Protestor faction; in 1670, Robert Leighton was appointed Archbishop of Glasgow in an attempt to bring dissenters back into the kirk. He failed to make progress; this was not simply due to the Protestor resistance but also that of Episcopalians, deriving from the presbytery struggles of the 1650s. This meant a return to persecution; preaching at a conventicle was made punishable by death, while attendance attracted severe sanctions. In 1674, heritors and masters were made responsible for the 'good behaviour' of their tenants and servants; from 1677, this meant posting bonds for those living on their land. In 1678, 3,000 Lowland militia and 6,000 Highlanders, known as the "Highland Host", were billeted in the Covenanting shires, especially those in the South-West, as a form of punishment.

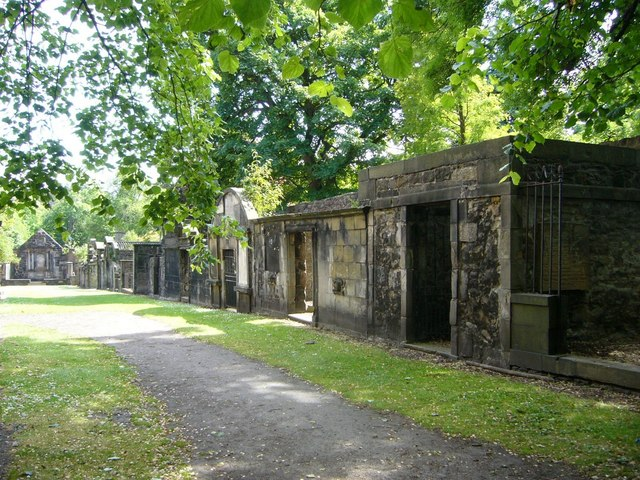
The Covenanter's Prison in St Giles Kirkyard, Edinburgh, where prisoners were held after the Battle of Bothwell Bridge in 1679

In 1679, a group of Covenanters killed Archbishop Sharp. The incident led to a rising that grew to 5,000 men. They were defeated by forces under James, Duke of Monmouth, the King's illegitimate son, at the Battle of Bothwell Bridge. Two ministers were executed and 250 followers shipped to Barbados, 200 drowning when their ship went down off Orkney. The rebellion eventually led to the fall of Lauderdale, who was replaced by the King's brother, the openly Catholic James, known in Scotland as the Duke of Albany.

The dissenters, led by Donald Cargill and Richard Cameron were originally known as the Society People, then later as the Cameronians. They became increasingly radical and on 22 June 1680 posted the Sanquhar Declaration, in which they renounced their allegiance to Charles II. After Cameron was killed, Cargill excommunicated Charles, his brother James and other royalists; Cargill himself was captured and executed in May 1681.

The government passed a Test Act in 1681, forcing every holder of public office to take an oath of non-resistance. Eight Episcopal clergy and James Dalrymple, Lord President of the Court of Session resigned and the leading nobleman Archibald Campbell, 9th Earl of Argyll was forced into exile. In 1684, the remaining Society People posted an Apologetical Declaration on several market crosses, threatening retaliation against government officials; In response to this new element of outright political sedition, the Scottish Privy Council authorised extrajudicial field executions of those caught in arms or those who refused to swear loyalty to the King. This more intense phase of persecution, later known in Protestant historiography as "the Killing Time", led to dissenters being summarily executed by the dragoons of James Graham, Laird of Claverhouse or sentenced to transportation or death by Sir George Mackenzie, the Lord Advocate.

== 1688 to 1700; Glorious Revolution ==
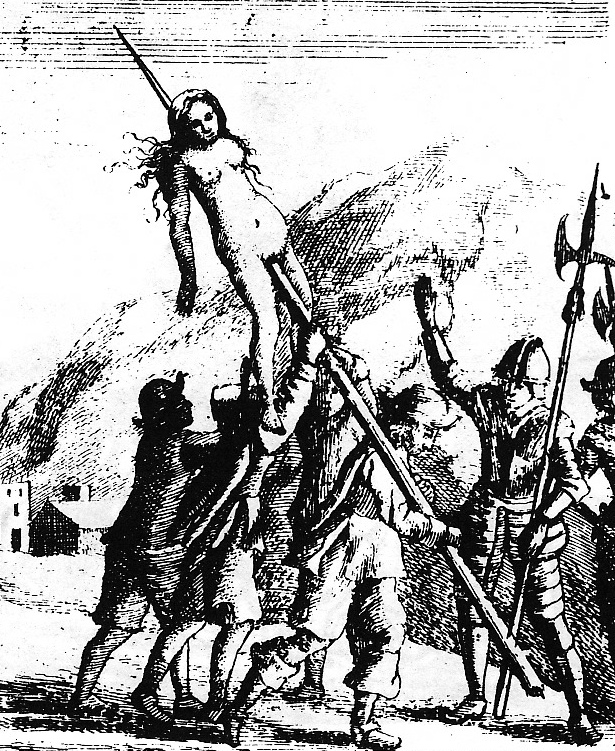
Images of alleged tortures inflicted on Vaudois Protestants in 1685 fed the perception of a Protestant Europe under threat

The Scottish Succession to Crown Act 1681 (c. 1) of August 1681 confirmed the divine right of kings, the rights of the natural heir 'regardless of religion,' the duty of all to swear allegiance to that king and the independence of the Scottish Crown. It went beyond simply ensuring James's succession to the Scottish throne by explicitly stating the aim was also to make his exclusion from the English throne impossible without '...the fatall and dreadfull consequences of a civil war.' At the same time, the 1681 Scottish Religion and the Test Act 1681 (c. 6) required all public officials to swear unconditional loyalty to the king, but with the crucial qualifier they 'promise to uphold the true Protestant religion'.

Despite his Catholicism, James became king in April 1685 with widespread support in Scotland due to fears of civil war if he were bypassed, while the rapid defeat of Argyll's Rising in June 1685 stemmed from opposition to re-opening past divisions within the kirk. In 1687, James extended 'tolerance' to the dissident Presbyterians who had backed Argyll, with the exception of the Cameronians, whose leading minister James Renwick was executed in 1688. Doing so alienated his Episcopalian base while promoting Catholics to senior government positions was seen as incompatible with his promise to ensure the primacy of the kirk.

It was also badly timed; Scotland in particular had long-standing cultural links with French Huguenots, who were expelled from France in October 1685. While fewer than 2% of Scots were Catholic, combined with the killing of 2,000 Swiss Protestants in 1686 it reinforced fears Protestant Europe was threatened by a Catholic counter-reformation. In June 1688, two events turned dissent into a crisis; the birth of James Francis Edward on 10 June created a Catholic heir, excluding James' Protestant daughter Mary and her husband William of Orange. Prosecuting the Seven Bishops was viewed as going beyond tolerance for Catholicism and into an assault on the Church of England; their acquittal on 30 June destroyed James' political authority.

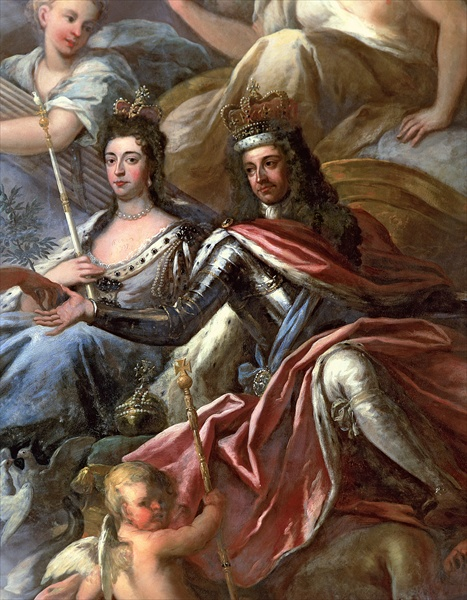
William III and Mary II depicted on the ceiling of the Painted Hall, Greenwich

Representatives from the English political class invited William to assume the English throne; when he landed in Brixham on 5 November, James' army deserted him and he left for France on 23 December. In Edinburgh, key Royal officials fled the capital leaving a power vacuum during which rioters stormed Holyrood Abbey, destroyed its Catholic chapel and damaged the tombs of the Stuart kings, while others took down the heads of executed Covenanters from above the city gates. Order was restored once news came James had gone into exile; while there was little domestic Scottish involvement in the coup, Scots were well represented among those who returned with William, while his invasion force included the Dutch Scots Brigade. Members of the Scottish Privy Council went to London and on 7 January 1689, they asked William to take over the responsibilities of government, pending a Scottish Convention in March.

While a large majority of the English Parliament agreed Mary should replace her father, William's demand he be made joint monarch and sole ruler if she died was only narrowly approved. In Scotland, the split within the kirk made William more important because his Calvinism meant Presbyterians saw him as a natural ally, while the Episcopalian minority could only retain control with his support. The Scottish Convention that convened on 14 March in Edinburgh was dominated by the Presbyterians. On 4 April, it passed the Claim of Right and the 'Articles of Grievances', which held James forfeited the Crown by his actions; on 11 May, William and Mary became co-monarchs of Scotland.

The General Assembly meeting in November 1690 was the first since 1654 and even before it convened, over 200 Episcopalian ministers had been removed from their livings. The 1690 Settlement eliminated episcopacy and created two commissions for the south and north of the Tay, which over the next 25 years removed almost two-thirds of all ministers. However, nearly one hundred clergy took advantage of Acts of indulgence in 1693 and 1695 to return to the kirk, while many others were protected by the local gentry. In 1673, Michael Fraser was appointed minister at Daviot and Dunlichty and was still there when he died in 1726, despite being evicted in 1694, as well as joining the 1715 and 1719 Jacobite Risings. Those who remained outside the kirk eventually formed the Reformed Presbyterian Church and the Scottish Episcopal Church.

== Popular Protestantism ==
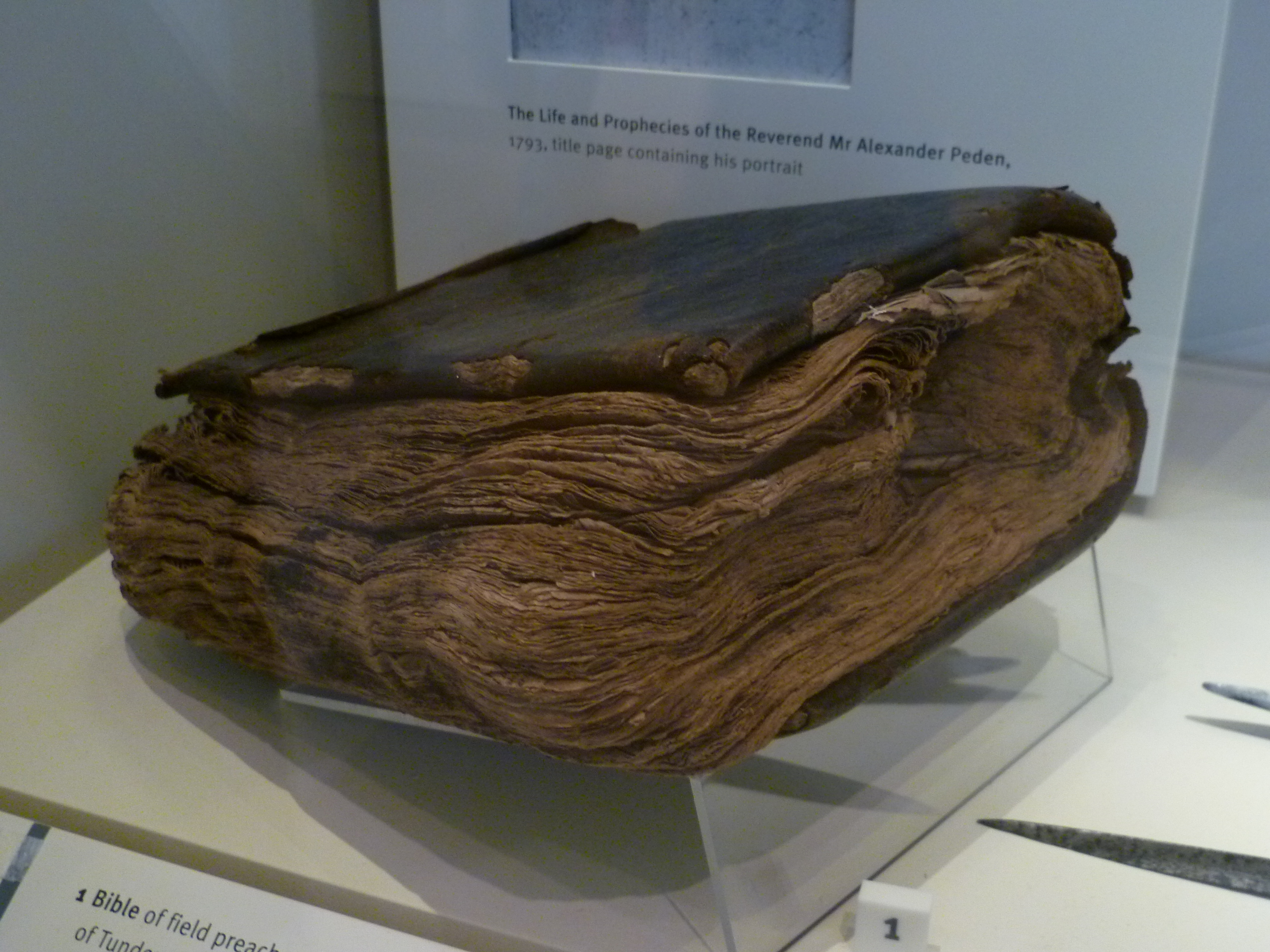
The Bible of William Hannay of Tundergarth, a Covenanter during the period of the "Killing Time"

Scottish Protestantism in the seventeenth century was highly focused on the Bible, which was seen as infallible and the major source of moral authority. The Geneva Bible was commonly used in the early part of the century; although the kirk adopted the Authorised King James Version in 1611 and the first Scots version was printed in 1633, it continued to be employed into the late seventeenth century. Family worship was strongly encouraged by the Covenanters. Books of devotion were distributed to encourage the practice and ministers were encouraged to investigate whether this was being carried out.

The seventeenth century saw the high-water mark of kirk discipline. Kirk sessions were able to apply religious sanctions, such as excommunication and denial of baptism, to enforce godly behaviour and obedience. In more difficult cases of immoral behaviour they could work with the local magistrate, in a system modelled on that employed in Geneva. Public occasions were treated with mistrust and from the later seventeenth century there were efforts by kirk sessions to stamp out activities such as well-dressing, bonfires, guising, penny weddings and dancing.

Under an act of 1649, kirk sessions were charged with levying taxes on local heritors for poor relief, rather than relying on voluntary contributions. By the mid-seventeenth century the system had largely been rolled out across the Lowlands, but was limited in the Highlands. The system was largely able to cope with general poverty and minor crises, helping the old and infirm to survive and provide life support in periods of downturn at relatively low cost, but was overwhelmed in the major subsistence crisis of the 1690s, known as the seven ill years. The kirk also had a major role in education. The School Establishment Act 1616, Education Act 1633 (c. 5), Education Act 1646 (c. 46) and Education Act 1696 (c. 26) established a parish school system, paid for by local heritors and administered by ministers and local presbyteries. By the late seventeenth century there was a largely complete network of parish schools in the Lowlands, but in the Highlands basic education was still lacking in many areas.

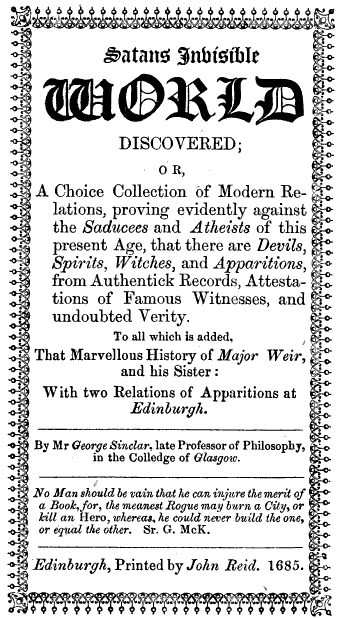
Title page from George Sinclair's Satans Invisible World (1685), one of the many tracts published in Scotland arguing the existence of witchcraft

In the seventeenth century the pursuit of witchcraft was largely taken over by the kirk sessions and was often used to attack superstitious and Catholic practices in Scottish society. Most of the accused, some 75 per cent, were women, with over 1,500 executed, and the witch hunt in Scotland has been seen as a means of controlling women. The most intense phase of persecution took place from 1661 to 1662, when over 664 people in four counties were accused of witchcraft. With the exception of local outbreaks in East Lothian in 1678 and 1697 at Paisley, the numbers declined as trials were tightly controlled by the judiciary and government, and evidence made less reliant on torture. It has also been suggested it was partly due to a reduction in economic and social tensions; the last recorded executions were in 1706, the last trial in 1727 and the Witchcraft Act 1563 (c. 9) was repealed in 1736.

== Catholicism ==
The number of practising Catholics continued to decline in the seventeenth century and the church structure deteriorated; by the 1640s, it is estimated fewer than 2% of Scots were Catholic, restricted to parts of the aristocracy and the remote Highlands and Islands. Some were to convert to Roman Catholicism, as did John Ogilvie (1569–1615), who went on to be ordained a priest in 1610, later being hanged for proselytism in Glasgow and often thought of as the only Scottish Catholic martyr of the Reformation era. An Irish Franciscan mission in the 1620s and 1630s claimed large numbers of converts, but these were confined to the Western Isles and had little impact on the mainland. A college for the education of Scots clergy was opened at Madrid in 1633, and was afterwards moved to Valladolid. In 1653, the remaining five or six clergy were incorporated under William Ballantine as prefect of the mission.

A small number of Jesuits were active in Strathgrass from the 1670s; in 1694, Thomas Nicolson was appointed as the first Vicar Apostolic over the mission in 1694 and the situation of Catholicism improved marginally. Nicholson divided Scotland into districts, each with its own designated priests and undertook visitations to ensure the implementation of Papal legislation; in 1700, his Statuta Missionis, which included a code of conduct for priests and laymen, were approved by all the clergy. However, by 1703 there were still only 33 Catholic clergy working in Scotland.

== Sources ==
- Anderson, R (2003). Bryce, TGK; Humes, WM (eds.). The history of Scottish Education pre-1980 in "Scottish Education: Post-Devolution". Edinburgh University Press. ISBN 0-7486-1625-X.;
- Baker, Derek (2009). Schism, Heresy and Religious Protest. Cambridge University Press. ISBN 978-0521101783.
- Bosher, JF (1994). "The Franco-Catholic Danger, 1660–1715". History. 79 (255): 5–30. doi:10.1111/j.1468-229X.1994.tb01587.x. JSTOR 24421929.
- Brown, S. J. (2012). Devine, T.M; Wormald, J (eds.). Religion and society to c. 1900 in The Oxford Handbook of Modern Scottish History. Oxford University Press. ISBN 978-0-19-956369-2.
- Buckley, J; Bauerschmidt, FC; Pomplun, T (2010). The Blackwell Companion to Catholicism. John Wiley & Sons. ISBN 978-1444337327.
- Callow, John (2004). "Cargill, Donald [Daniel] 1627-1681". Oxford Dictionary of National Biography (online ed.). Oxford University Press. doi:10.1093/ref:odnb/4461. (Subscription, Wikipedia Library access or UK public library membership required.)
- Croft, P., King James (Basingstoke and New York: Palgrave Macmillan, 2003), ISBN 0-333-61395-3.
- Dow, F D (1979). Cromwellian Scotland 1651-1660. John Donald.
- Fissel, Mark (1994). The Bishops' Wars: Charles I's Campaigns against Scotland, 1638-1640. Cambridge University Press. ISBN 0521466865.
- Graham, M. F., "Scotland", in A. Pettegree, The Reformation World (London: Routledge, 2000), ISBN 0-415-16357-9.
- Grell, O. P.; Cunningham, A (1997). Health Care and Poor Relief in Protestant Europe, 1500–1700. Routledge. ISBN 0-415-12130-2.;
- Harris, Tim (2015). Rebellion: Britain's First Stuart Kings, 1567-1642. OUP Oxford. ISBN 978-0198743118.
- Harris, Tim (2007). Revolution: The Great Crisis of the British Monarchy, 1685–1720. Allen Lane. ISBN 978-0-7139-9759-0.
- Harris, Tim; Taylor, Stuart (2013). Final Crisis of the Stuart Monarchy: The Revolutions of 1688-91 in Their British, Atlantic and European Contexts. Boydell Press. ISBN 978-1843838166.
- Herbermann, C. G., ed. (1912). The Catholic Encyclopedia;: an International Work of Reference on the Constitution, Doctrine, Discipline, and History of the Catholic church; Volume 13. Appleton.
- Henderson, G. D. (2011). Religious Life in Seventeenth-Century Scotland. Cambridge University Press. ISBN 978-0-521-24877-8..
- Holfelder, Kyle (1998). Factionalism in the Kirk during the Cromwellian Invasion and Occupation of Scotland, 1650 to 1660: The Protester-Resolutioner Controversy (PHD). University of Edinburgh.
- Houston, R. A.; Whyte, I. D., eds. (2005). Scottish Society, 1500–1800. Cambridge University Press. ISBN 0-521-89167-1..
- Jackson, Claire (2003). Restoration Scotland, 1660-1690: Royalist Politics, Religion and Ideas. Boydell Press. ISBN 978-0851159300.
- Lenman, Bruce (1980). The Jacobite Risings in Britain 1689-1746. Eyre Methuen. ISBN 978-0413396501.
- Levack, B. P. (2002). Goodare, J (ed.). The decline and end of Scottish witch-hunting in "The Scottish Witch-Hunt in Context". Manchester University Press. ISBN 0-7190-6024-9.;
- Lynch, Michael (1992). Scotland: A New History. Pimlico. ISBN 0-7126-9893-0.
- Macleod, Donald (Autumn 2009). "The influence of Calvinism on politics" (PDF). Theology in Scotland. XVI (2).
- Mackie, JD; Lenman, Bruce; Parker, Geoffrey (1986). A History of Scotland. Hippocrene Books. ISBN 978-0880290401.
- Main, David. "The Origins of the Scottish Episcopal Church". St Ninians Castle Douglas. Archived from the original on 7 April 2019.
- Mairena, M. C. C. (2008). The Restoration of the Roman Catholic Hierarchy in Scotland (PHD). Catholic University of America. ISBN 978-0549388333.
- McCoy, F.N (1974). Robert Baillie and the Second Scots Reformation. University of California Press. ISBN 0-520-02447-8.
- McDonald, Alan (1998). The Jacobean Kirk, 1567–1625: Sovereignty, Polity and Liturgy. Routledge. ISBN 185928373X.
- Melville, James (1842). Pitcairn, Robert (ed.). The Autobiography and Diary of Mr. James Melvill, with a Continuation of the Diary (2015 ed.). Arkose Press. ISBN 1343621844.
- Mitchison, Rosalind; Fry, Peter; Fry, Fiona (2002). A History of Scotland. Routledge. ISBN 978-1138174146.
- Mitchison, Rosalind (1990). Lordship to Patronage. Edinburgh University Press. ISBN 074860233X.
- Morrill, John (1990). Oliver Cromwell and the English Revolution. Longman. ISBN 0582016754.
- Plant, David. "Scottish National Covenant". BCW Project.
- Prebble, John (1973). Culloden. Martin Secker & Warburg Ltd. ISBN 978-0436386015.
- Robertson, Barry (2014). Royalists at War in Scotland and Ireland, 1638–1650. Routledge. ISBN 978-1317061069.
- Royle, Trevor (2005). Civil War: The War of the Three Kingdoms 1638-1660. Abacus. ISBN 0349115648.
- Spielvogel, Jackson J (1980). Western Civilization. Wadsworth Publishing. ISBN 1285436407.
- Stephen, Jeffrey (January 2010). "Scottish Nationalism and Stuart Unionism". Journal of British Studies. 49 (1, Scottish Special). doi:10.1086/644534. S2CID 144730991.
- Stevenson, David (1973). Scottish Revolution, 1637-44: Triumph of the Covenanters. David & Charles. ISBN 0715363026.
- Stewart, A., The Cradle King: A Life of James VI & I (London: Chatto and Windus, 2003), ISBN 0-7011-6984-2.
- Wilson, Peter (2009). The Thirty Years War: Europe's Tragedy. Belknap Press. ISBN 978-0674062313.
- Wormald, J (1991). Court, Kirk, and Community: Scotland, 1470–1625. Edinburgh University Press. ISBN 0-7486-0276-3.
- Womersley, David (2015). James II (Penguin Monarchs): The Last Catholic King. Allen Lane. ISBN 978-0141977065..
