= St Giles' Cathedral =

- High Kirk of Edinburgh
- Cathair-eaglais Naomh Giles
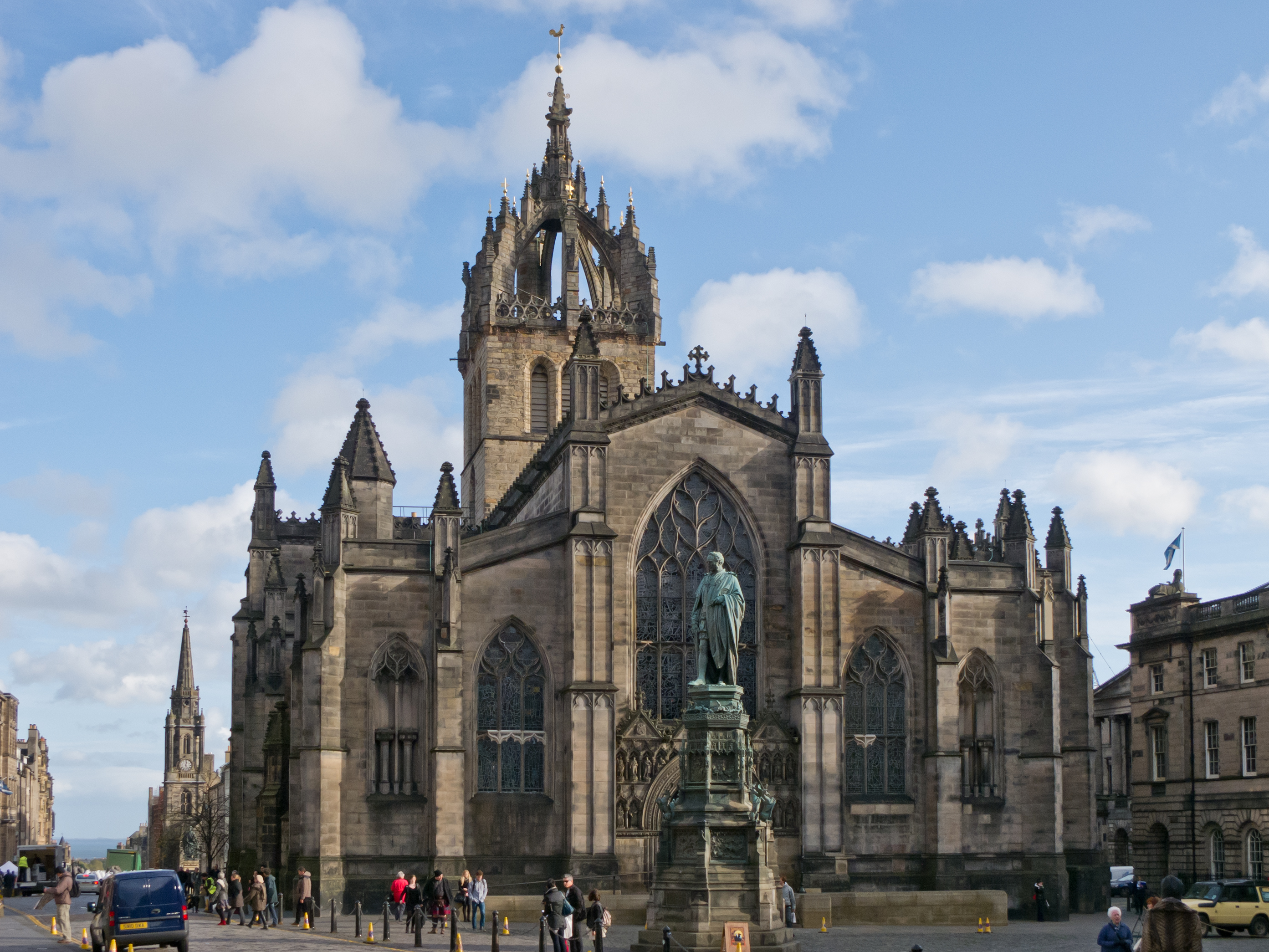
- West façade of the church building
- St Giles' Cathedral
- 55°56′58″N 03°11′27″W
- Location: Royal Mile, Edinburgh
- Country: Scotland
- Denomination: Church of Scotland
- Previous denomination: Roman Catholic
- Website: www.stgilescathedral.org.uk

History
- Status: Parish church
- Founded: 12th century
- Dedication: Saint Giles
- Consecrated: 6 October 1243

Architecture
- Functional status: Active
- Heritage designation: Category A listed building
- Designated: 14 December 1970
- Style: Gothic

Specifications
- Length: 196 feet (60 metres)
- Width: 125 feet (38 metres)
- Height: 52 feet (16 metres)

Listed Building – Category A
- Official name: High Street and Parliament Square, St Giles (High) Kirk
- Designated: 14 December 1970
- Reference no.: LB27381

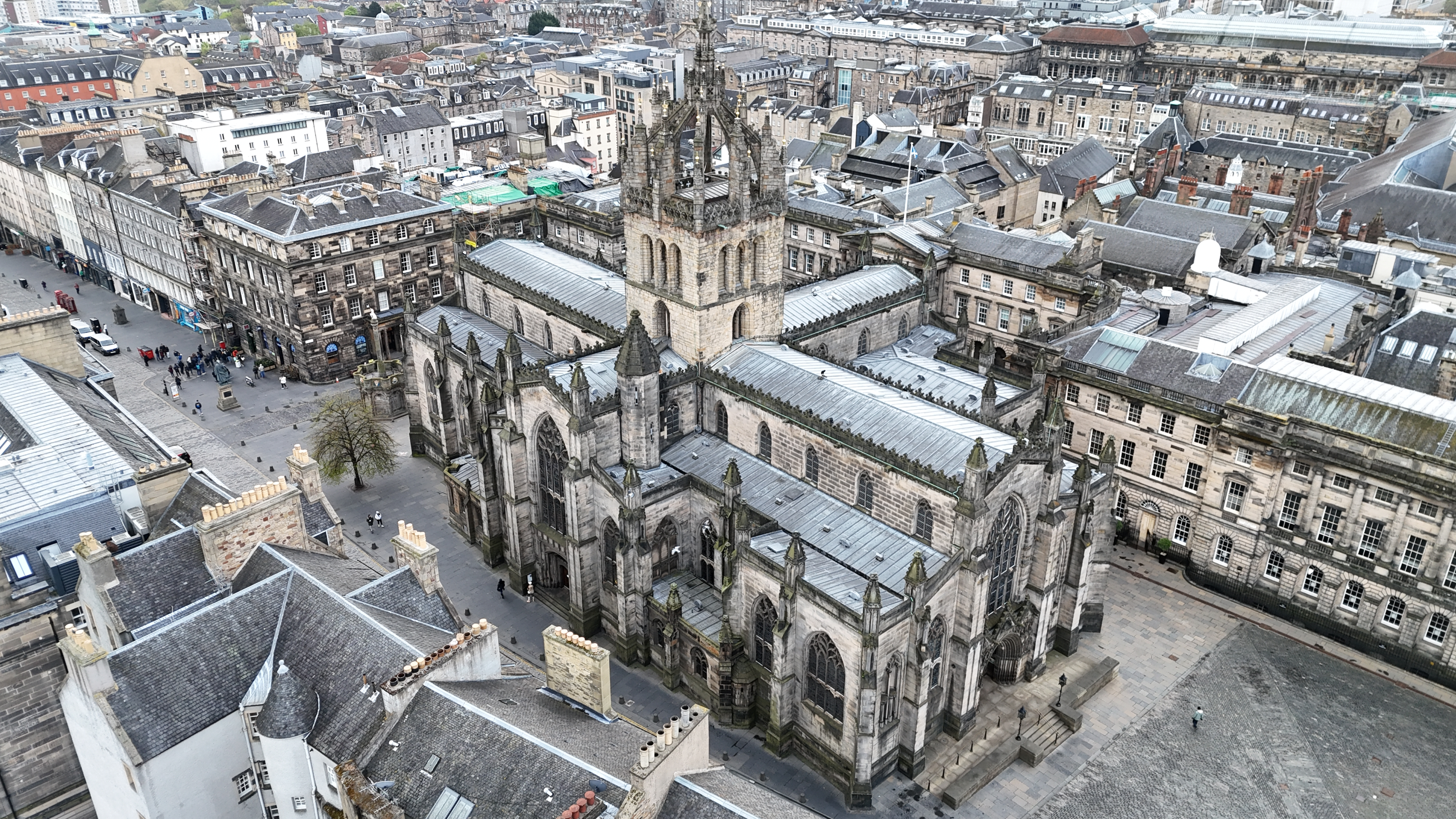
Aerial view of St Giles' Cathedral

St Giles' Cathedral (Scottish Gaelic: Cathair-eaglais Naomh Giles), also known as the High Kirk of Edinburgh, is one of three cathedrals in Edinburgh, Scotland. The existing building was begun in the 14th century and extended until the early 16th century; significant alterations were undertaken in the 19th and 20th centuries, including the addition of the Thistle Chapel. St Giles' is closely associated with many events and figures in Scottish history, including John Knox, who served as the church's minister after the Scottish Reformation. The cathedral is administered by the Church of Scotland.

It was probably founded in the 12th century (Note: Some sources attribute the foundation of St Giles' to David's brother and predecessor, Alexander I.) (Note: Symeon of Durham refers to the parish church at "Edwinsburch" as being in the possession of Lindisfarne in 854; however, whether this refers to a church on the site of the current St Giles', an earlier church, or another church is uncertain.) and dedicated to Saint Giles. The church was elevated to collegiate status by Pope Paul II in 1467. In 1559, the church became Protestant with John Knox, the foremost figure of the Scottish Reformation, as its minister. After the Reformation, St Giles' was internally partitioned to serve multiple congregations as well as secular purposes, such as a prison and as a meeting place for the Parliament of Scotland. In 1633, Charles I made St Giles' the cathedral of the newly created Diocese of Edinburgh. Charles' attempt to impose doctrinal changes on the presbyterian Scottish Kirk, including a Prayer Book causing a riot in St Giles' on 23 July 1637, which precipitated the formation of the Covenanters and the beginnings of the Wars of the Three Kingdoms. St Giles' role in the Scottish Reformation and the Covenanters' Rebellion has led to its being called "the Mother Church of World Presbyterianism".

St Giles' is one of Scotland's most important medieval parish church buildings. The first church of St Giles' was a small Romanesque building of which only fragments remain. In the 14th century, this was replaced by the current building which was enlarged between the late 14th and early 16th centuries. The church was altered between 1829 and 1833 by William Burn and restored between 1872 and 1883 by William Hay with the support of William Chambers. Chambers hoped to make St Giles' a "Westminster Abbey for Scotland" by enriching the church and adding memorials to notable Scots. Between 1909 and 1911, the Thistle Chapel, designed by Robert Lorimer, was added to the church.

Since the medieval period, St Giles' has been the site of nationally important events and services; the services of the Order of the Thistle take place there. Alongside housing an active congregation, the church is one of Scotland's most popular visitor sites: it attracted over a million visitors in 2018.

== Name and dedication ==
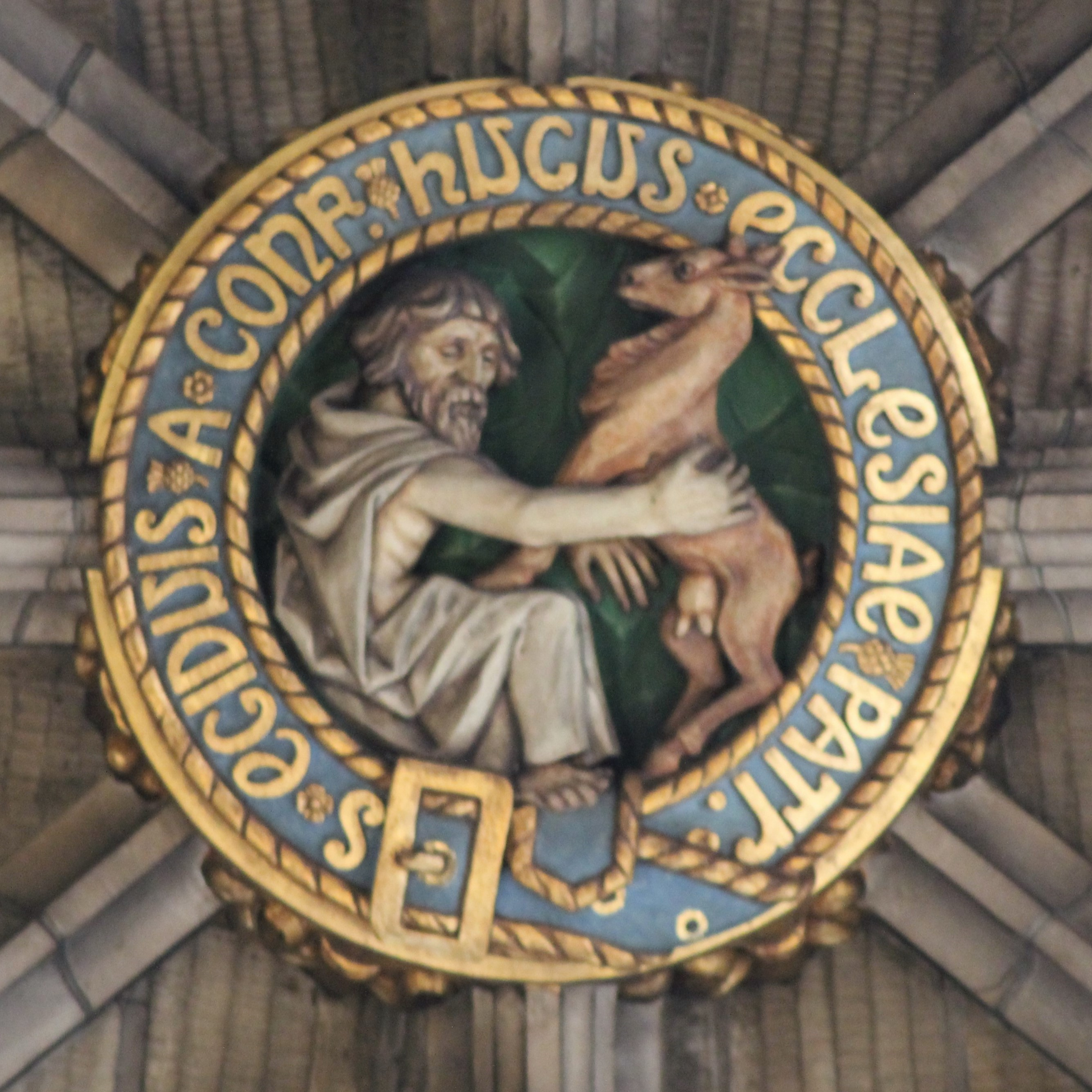
Saint Giles depicted in a boss in the ceiling of the Thistle Chapel

Saint Giles is the patron saint of lepers. Though chiefly associated with the Abbey of Saint-Gilles in modern-day France, he was a popular saint in medieval Scotland. (Note: In England, 162 ancient churches and at least 24 hospitals were dedicated to Saint Giles; though his only other surviving medieval dedication in Scotland is the parish church of Elgin.) The church was first possessed by the monks of the Order of St Lazarus, who ministered among lepers; if David I or Alexander I is the church's founder, the dedication may be connected to their sister Matilda, who founded St Giles in the Fields.

Prior to the Reformation, St Giles' was the only parish church in Edinburgh and some contemporary writers, such as Jean Froissart, refer simply to the "church of Edinburgh". From its elevation to collegiate status in 1467 until the Reformation, the church's full title was "the Collegiate Church of St Giles of Edinburgh". Even after the Reformation, the church is attested as "the college kirk of Sanct Geill". The charter of 1633 raising St Giles' to a cathedral records its common name as "Saint Giles' Kirk".

St Giles' held cathedral status between 1633 and 1638 and again between 1661 and 1689 during periods of episcopacy within the Church of Scotland. Since 1689, the Church of Scotland, as a Presbyterian church, has had no bishops and, therefore, no cathedrals. St Giles' is one of a number of former cathedrals in the Church of Scotland – such as Glasgow Cathedral or Dunblane Cathedral – that retain their title despite having lost this status. Since the church's initial elevation to cathedral status, the building as a whole has generally been called St Giles' Cathedral, St Giles' Kirk or Church, or simply St Giles'.

The title "High Kirk" is briefly attested during the reign of James VI as referring to the whole building. A 1625 order of the Privy Council of Scotland refers to the Great Kirk congregation, which was then meeting in St Giles', as the "High Kirk". The title fell out of use until reapplied in the late 18th century to the East (or New) Kirk, the most prominent of the four congregations then meeting in the church. Since 1883, the High Kirk congregation has occupied the entire building.

== Location ==
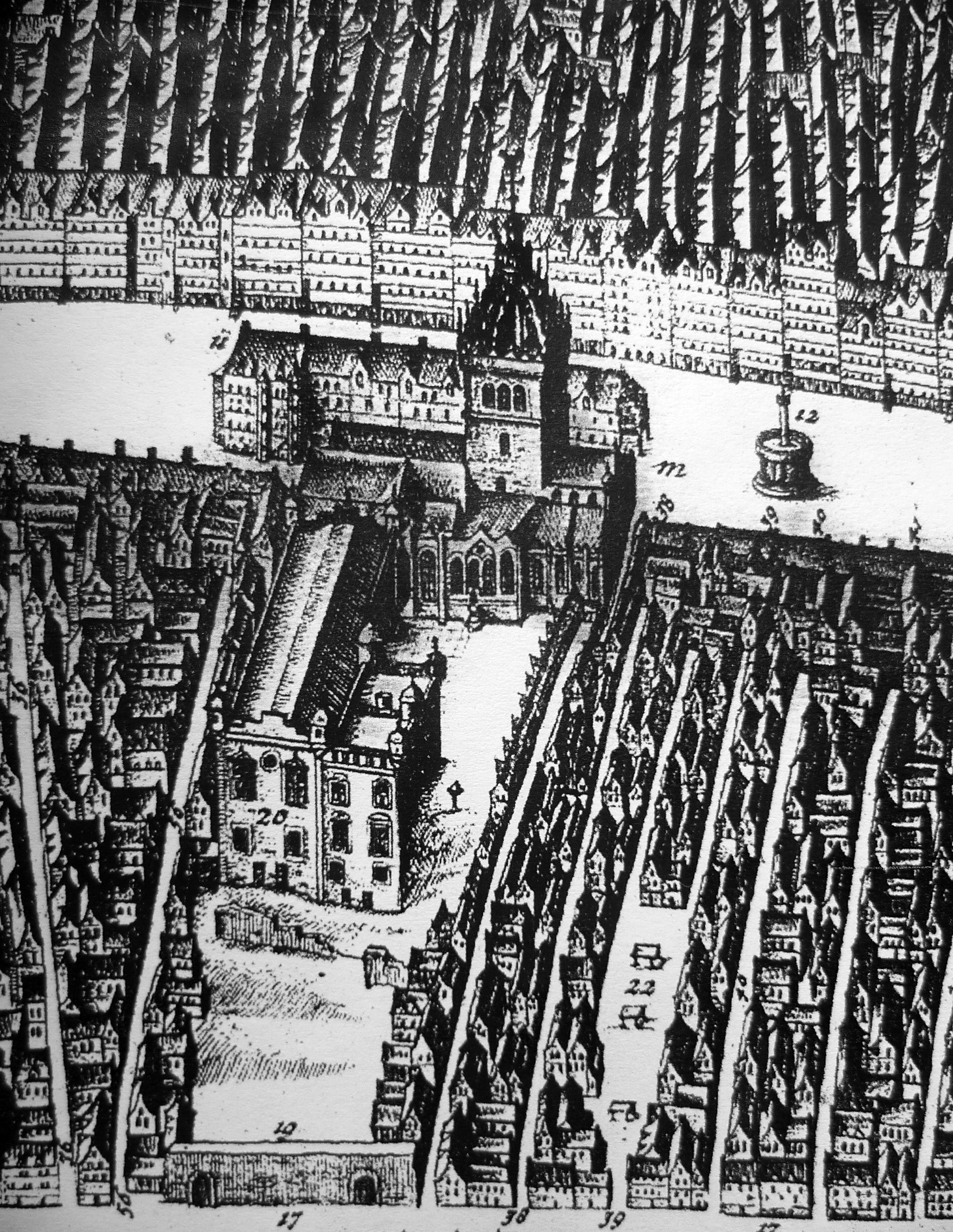
St Giles' in 1647, showing the Tolbooth and Luckenbooths on the north of the church and Parliament House in the kirkyard to its south

The Royal Commission on the Ancient and Historical Monuments of Scotland identified St Giles' as "the central focus of the Old Town." The church occupies a prominent and flat portion of the ridge that leads down from Edinburgh Castle; it sits on the south side of the High Street: the main street of the Old Town and one of the streets that make up the Royal Mile.

From its initial construction in the 12th century until the 14th century, St Giles' was located near the eastern edge of Edinburgh. By the time of the construction of the King's Wall in the mid-15th century, the burgh had expanded and St Giles' stood near its central point. In the late medieval and early modern periods, St Giles' was also located at the centre of Edinburgh's civic life: the Tolbooth – Edinburgh's administrative centre – stood immediately north-west of the church and the Mercat Cross – Edinburgh's commercial and symbolic centre – stood immediately north-east of it.

From the construction of the Tolbooth in the late 14th century until the early 19th century, St Giles' stood in the most constricted point of the High Street with the Luckenbooths and Tolbooth jutting into the High Street immediately north and north-west of the church. A lane known as the Stinkand Style (or Kirk Style) was formed in the narrow space between the Luckenbooths and the north side of the church. In this lane, open stalls known as the Krames were set up between the buttresses of the church.

St Giles' forms the north side of Parliament Square with the Law Courts on the south side of the square. The area immediately south of the church was originally the kirkyard, which stretched downhill to the Cowgate. For more than 450 years, St Giles' served as the parish burial ground for the whole of the burgh. At its greatest extent, the burial grounds covered almost 0.5ha. This was closed to burials in 1561 and handed over to the town council in 1566. From the construction of Parliament House in 1639, the former kirkyard was developed and the square formed. The west front of St Giles' faces the former Midlothian County Buildings across West Parliament Square.

== History ==
=== Early years ===
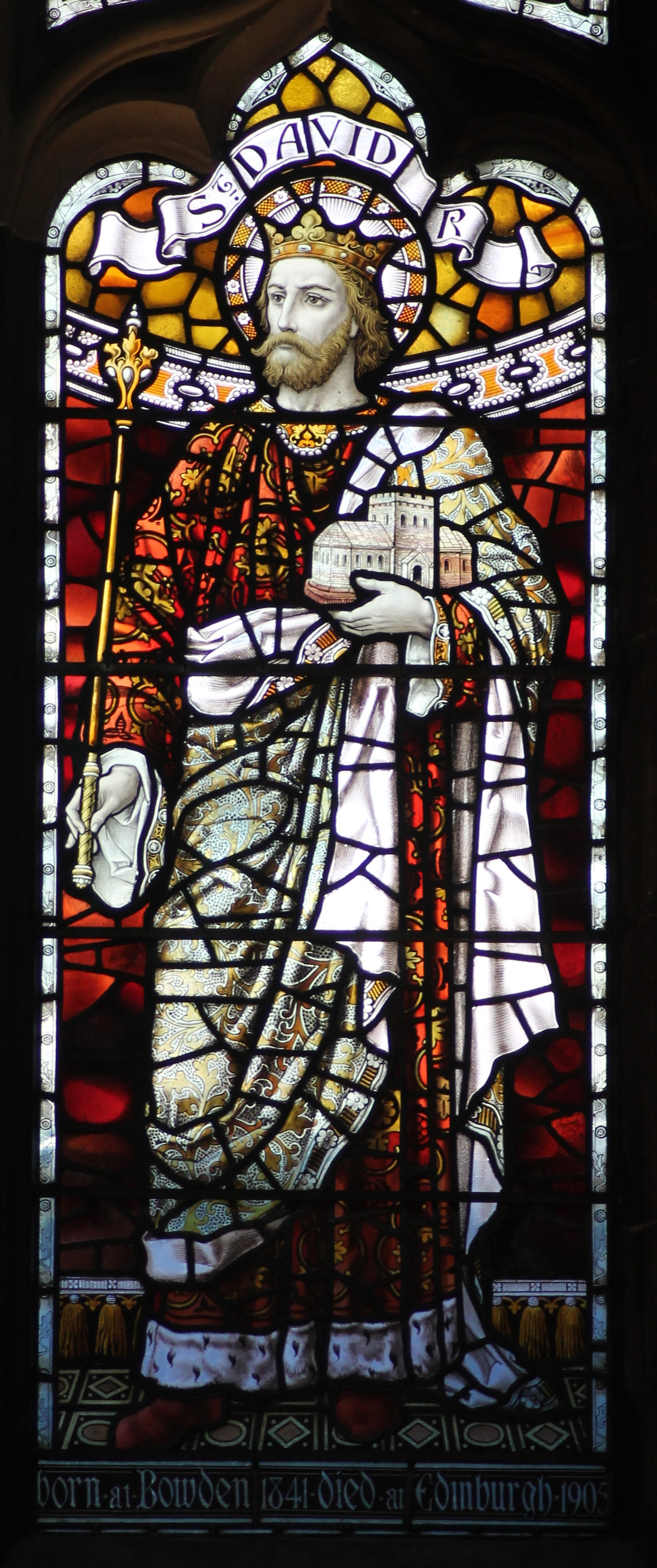
David I holds a speculative model of the first St Giles' in a 20th-century window.

The foundation of St Giles' is usually dated to 1124 and attributed to David I. The parish was likely detached from the older parish of St Cuthbert's. David raised Edinburgh to the status of a burgh and, during his reign, the church and its lands (St Giles' Grange) are first attested, being in the possession of monks of the Order of Saint Lazarus. Remnants of the destroyed Romanesque church display similarities to the church at Dalmeny, which was built between 1140 and 1166. St Giles' was consecrated by David de Bernham, Bishop of St Andrews on 6 October 1243. As St Giles' is attested almost a century earlier, this was likely a re-consecration to correct the loss of any record of the original consecration.

In 1322 during the First Scottish War of Independence, troops of Edward II of England despoiled Holyrood Abbey and may have attacked St Giles' as well. Jean Froissart records that, in 1384, Scottish knights and barons met secretly with French envoys in St Giles' and, against the wishes of Robert II, planned a raid into the northern counties of England. Though the raid was a success, Richard II of England took retribution on the Scottish borders and Edinburgh in August 1385 and St Giles' was burned. The scorch marks were reportedly still visible on the pillars of the crossing in the 19th century.

At some point in the 14th century, the 12th century Romanesque St Giles' was replaced by the current Gothic church. At least the crossing and nave had been built by 1387 as, in that year, Provost Andrew Yichtson and Adam Forrester of Nether Liberton commissioned John Skuyer, John Primrose, and John of Scone to add five chapels to the south side of the nave.

In the 1370s, the Lazarite friars supported the King of England and St Giles' reverted to the Scottish crown. In 1393, Robert III granted St Giles' to Scone Abbey in compensation for the expenses incurred by the abbey in 1390 during the King's coronation and the funeral of his father. Subsequent records show clerical appointments at St Giles' were made by the monarch, suggesting the church reverted to the crown soon afterwards.

In 1416, a pair of white stork nested on top of the building.

=== Collegiate church ===
In 1419, Archibald Douglas, 4th Earl of Douglas led an unsuccessful petition to Pope Martin V to elevate St Giles' to collegiate status. Unsuccessful petitions to Rome followed in 1423 and 1429. The burgh launched another petition for collegiate status in 1466, which was granted by Pope Paul II in February 1467. The foundation replaced the role of vicar with a provost accompanied by a curate, sixteen canons, a beadle, a minister of the choir, and four choristers.

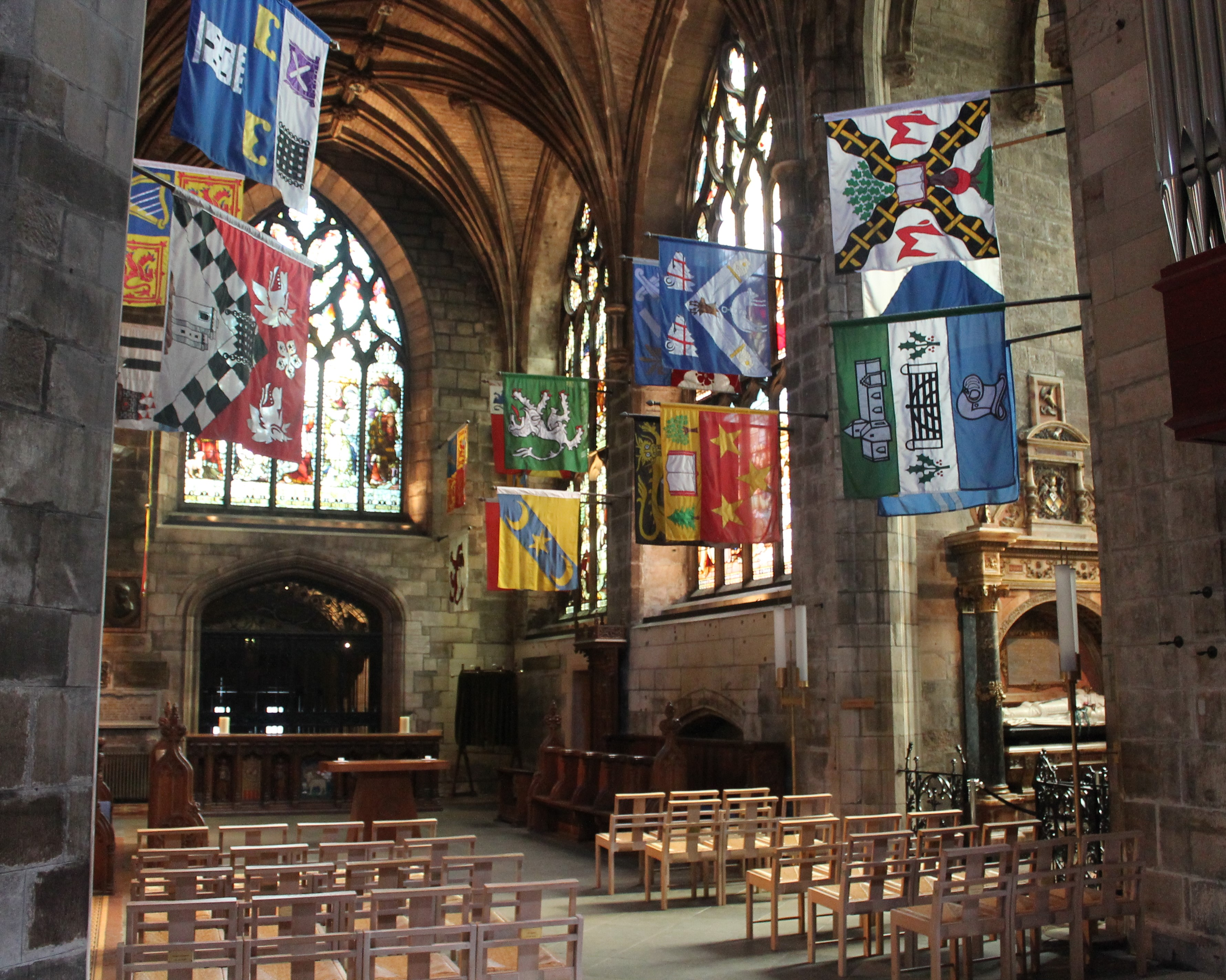
Preston Aisle

During the period of these petitions, William Preston of Gorton had, with the permission of Charles VII of France, brought from France the arm bone of Saint Giles, an important relic. From the mid-1450s, the Preston Aisle was added to the southern side of the choir to commemorate this benefactor; Preston's eldest male descendants were given the right to carry the relic at the head of the Saint Giles' Day procession every 1 September. Around 1460, extension of the chancel and the addition thereto of a clerestory were supported by Mary of Guelders, possibly in memory of her husband, James II.

In the years following St Giles' elevation to collegiate status, the number of chaplainries and endowments increased greatly and by the Reformation there may have been as many as fifty altars in St Giles'. (Note: This figure is uncertain due to some altars' possessing multiple dedications, only one of which is named in references.) In 1470, Pope Paul II further elevated St Giles' status by granting a petition from James III to exempt the church from the jurisdiction of the Bishop of St Andrews.

During Gavin Douglas' provostship, St Giles' was central to Scotland's response to national disaster of the Battle of Flodden in 1513. As Edinburgh's men were ordered by the town council to defend the city, its women were ordered to gather in St Giles' to pray for James IV and his army. Requiem Mass for the King and the memorial mass for the dead of the battle were held in St Giles' and Walter Chepman endowed a chapel of the Crucifixion in the lower part of the kirkyard in the King's memory.

In the summer of 1544 during the war known as the Rough Wooing, after an English army had burnt Edinburgh, Regent Arran maintained a garrison of gunners in the tower of the church. New stalls for the choir were made by Robert Fendour and Andrew Mansioun between 1552 and 1554.

The earliest record of Reformed sentiment at St Giles' is in 1535, when Andrew Johnston, one of the chaplains, was forced to leave Scotland on the grounds of heresy. In October 1555, the town council ceremonially burned English language books, likely Reformers' texts, outside St Giles'. The theft from the church of images of the Virgin, St Francis, and the Trinity in 1556 may have been agitation by reformers. In July 1557, the church's statue of its patron, Saint Giles, was stolen and, according to John Knox, drowned in the Nor Loch then burned. For use in that year's Saint Giles' Day procession, the statue was replaced by one borrowed from Edinburgh's Franciscans; though this was also damaged when Protestants disrupted the event.

=== Reformation ===
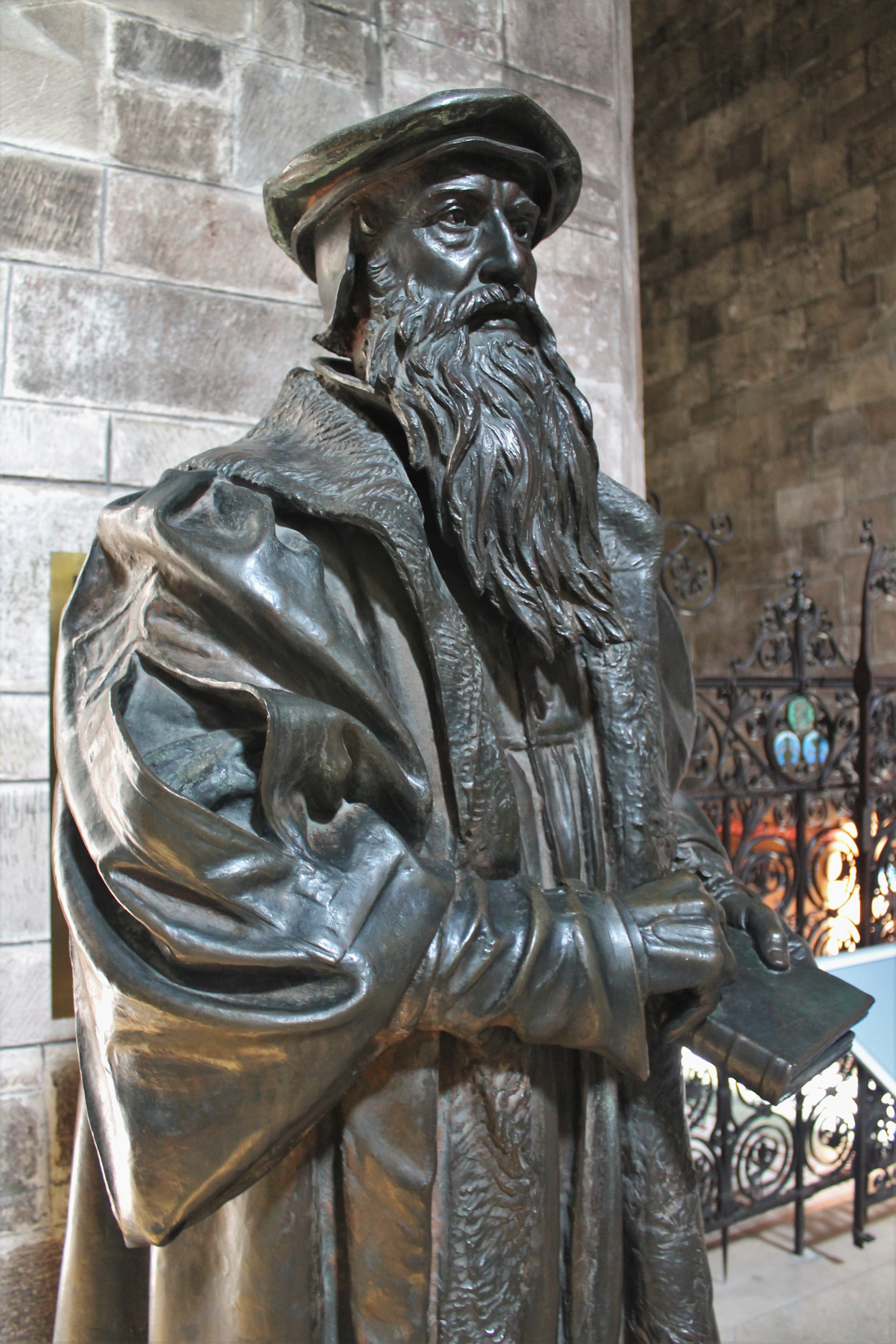
Statue of John Knox by James Pittendrigh Macgillivray

At the beginning of 1559, with the Scottish Reformation gaining ground, the town council hired soldiers to defend St Giles' from the Reformers; the council also distributed the church's treasures among trusted townsmen for safekeeping. At 3 pm on 29 June 1559 the army of the Lords of the Congregation entered Edinburgh unopposed and, that afternoon, John Knox, the foremost figure of the Reformation in Scotland, first preached in St Giles'. The following week, Knox was elected minister of St Giles' and, the week after that, the purging of the church's Roman Catholic furnishings began.

Mary of Guise (who was then ruling as regent for her daughter Mary) offered Holyrood Abbey as a place of worship for those who wished to remain in the Roman Catholic faith while St Giles' served Edinburgh's Protestants. Mary of Guise also offered the Lords of the Congregation that the parish church of Edinburgh would, after 10 January 1560, remain in whichever confession proved the most popular among the burgh's inhabitants. These proposals, however, came to nothing and the Lords of the Congregation signed a truce with the Roman Catholic forces and vacated Edinburgh. Knox, fearing for his life, left the city on 24 July 1559. St Giles', however, remained in Protestant hands. Knox's deputy, John Willock, continued to preach even as French soldiers disrupted his sermons, and ladders, to be used in the Siege of Leith, were constructed in the church.

The events of the Scottish Reformation thereafter briefly turned in favour of the Roman Catholic party: they retook Edinburgh and the French agent Nicolas de Pellevé, Bishop of Amiens, reconsecrated St Giles' as a Roman Catholic church on 9 November 1559. After the Treaty of Berwick secured the intervention of Elizabeth I of England on the side of the Reformers, they retook Edinburgh. St Giles' once again became a Protestant church on 1 April 1560 and Knox returned to Edinburgh on 23 April 1560. The Parliament of Scotland legislated that, from 24 August 1560, the Pope had no authority in Scotland.

Workmen, assisted by sailors from the Port of Leith, took nine days to clear stone altars and monuments from the church. Precious items used in pre-Reformation worship were sold. The church was whitewashed, its pillars painted green, and the Ten Commandments and Lord's Prayer painted on the walls. Seating was installed for children and the burgh's council and incorporations. A pulpit was also installed, likely at the eastern side of the crossing. In 1561, the kirkyard to the south of the church was closed and most subsequent burials were conducted at Greyfriars Kirkyard.

=== Church and crown: 1567–1633 ===
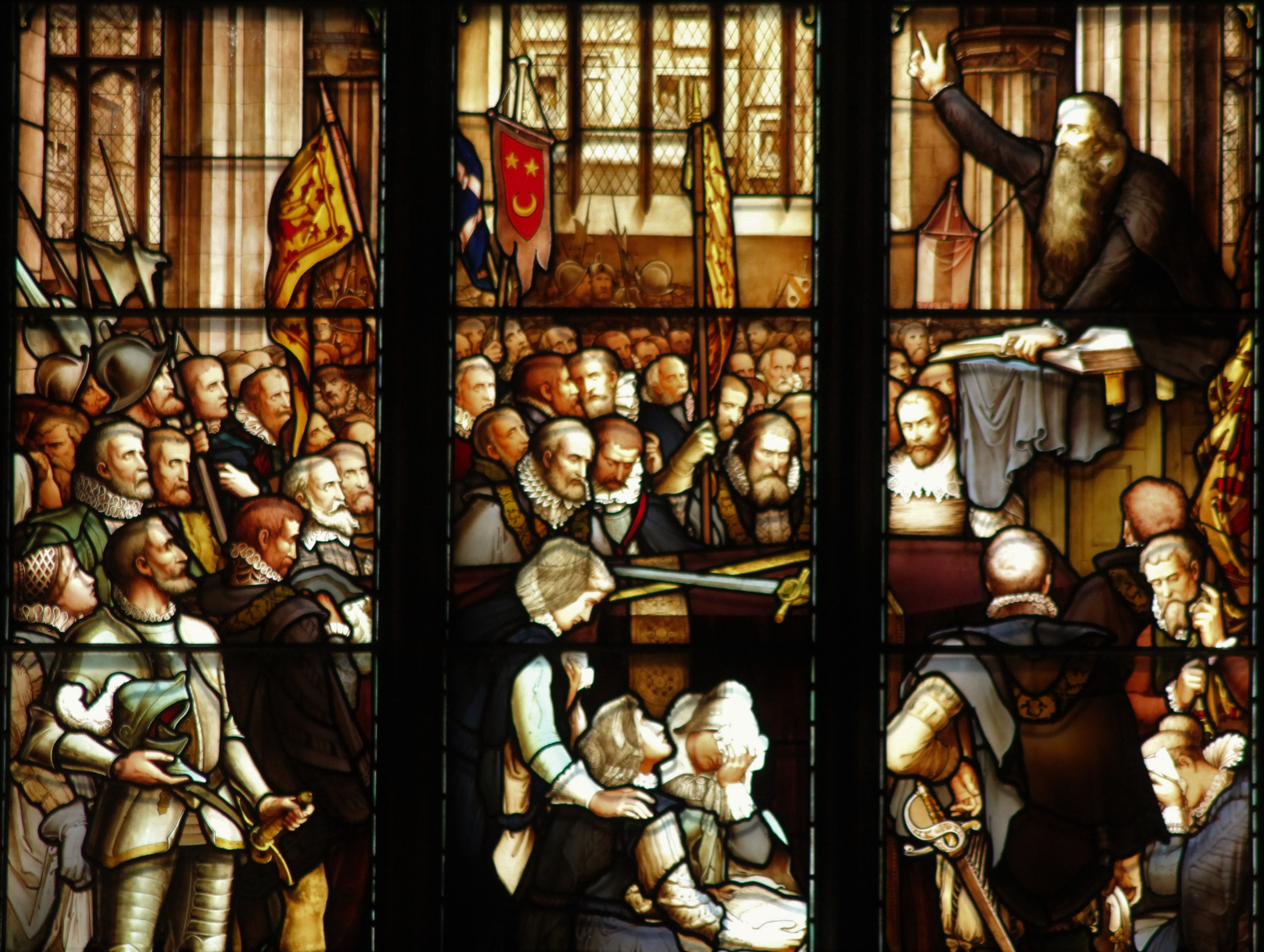
John Knox (top right) preaching the funeral sermon of the Regent Moray in 1570, depicted in a 19th-century window

In 1567, Mary, Queen of Scots was deposed and succeeded by her infant son, James VI, St Giles' was a focal point of the ensuing Marian civil war. After his assassination in January 1570, the Regent Moray, a leading opponent of Mary, Queen of Scots, was interred within the church; John Knox preached at this event. Edinburgh briefly fell to Mary's forces and, in June and July 1572, William Kirkcaldy of Grange stationed soldiers and cannon in the tower. Although his colleague of 9 years John Craig had remained in Edinburgh during these events, Knox, his health failing, had retired to St Andrews. A deputation from Edinburgh recalled him to St Giles' and there he preached his final sermon on 9 November 1572. Knox died later that month and was buried in the kirkyard in the presence of the Regent Morton.

After the Reformation, parts of St Giles' were given over to secular purposes. In 1562 and 1563, the western three bays of the church were partitioned off by a wall to serve as an extension to the Tolbooth: it was used, in this capacity, as a meeting place for the burgh's criminal courts, the Court of Session, and the Parliament of Scotland. Recalcitrant Roman Catholic clergy (and, later, inveterate sinners) were imprisoned in the room above the north door. The tower was also used as a prison by the end of the 16th century. The Maiden – an early form of guillotine – was stored in the church. The vestry was converted into an office and library for the town clerk and weavers were permitted to set up their looms in the loft.

Around 1581, the interior was partitioned into two meeting houses: the chancel became the East (or Little or New) Kirk and the crossing and the remainder of the nave became the Great (or Old) Kirk. These congregations, along with Trinity College Kirk and the Magdalen Chapel, were served by a joint kirk session. In 1598, the upper storey of the Tolbooth partition was converted into the West (or Tolbooth) Kirk.

During the early majority of James VI, the ministers of St Giles' – led by Knox's successor, James Lawson – formed, in the words of Cameron Lees, "a kind of spiritual conclave with which the state had to reckon before any of its proposals regarding ecclesiastical matters could become law". During his attendance at the Great Kirk, James was often harangued in the ministers' sermons and relations between the King and the Reformed clergy deteriorated. In the face of opposition from St Giles' ministers, James introduced successive laws to establish episcopacy in the Church of Scotland from 1584. Relations reached their nadir after a tumult at St Giles' on 17 December 1596. The King briefly removed to Linlithgow and the ministers were blamed for inciting the crowd; they fled the city rather than comply with their summons to appear before the King. To weaken the ministers, James made effective, as of April 1598, an order of the town council from 1584 to divide Edinburgh into distinct parishes. In 1620, the Upper Tolbooth congregation vacated St Giles' for the newly established Greyfriars Kirk.

=== Cathedral ===
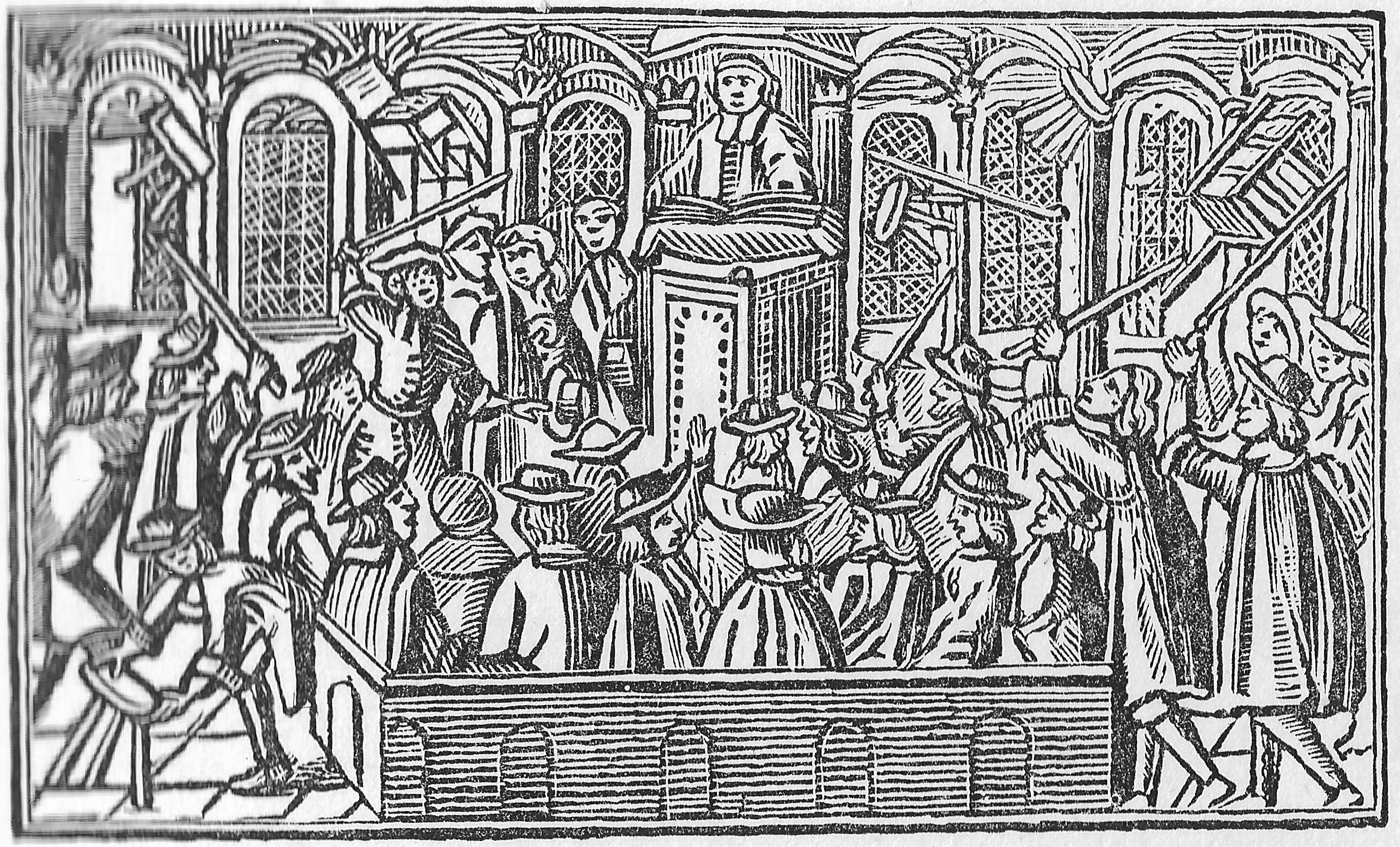
Riot against the introduction of the prayer book

James' son and successor, Charles I, first visited St Giles' on 23 June 1633 during his visit to Scotland for his coronation. He arrived at the church unannounced and displaced the reader with clergy who conducted the service according to the rites of the Church of England. On 29 September that year, Charles, responding to a petition from John Spottiswoode, Archbishop of St Andrews, elevated St Giles' to the status of a cathedral to serve as the seat of the new Bishop of Edinburgh. Work began to remove the internal partition walls and to furnish the interior in the manner of Durham Cathedral.

Work on the church was incomplete when, on 23 July 1637, the replacement in St Giles' of Knox's Book of Common Order by a Scottish version of the Church of England's Book of Common Prayer provoked rioting due to the latter's perceived similarities to Roman Catholic ritual. Tradition attests that this riot was started when a market trader named Jenny Geddes threw her stool at the dean, James Hannay. In response to the unrest, services at St Giles' were temporarily suspended.

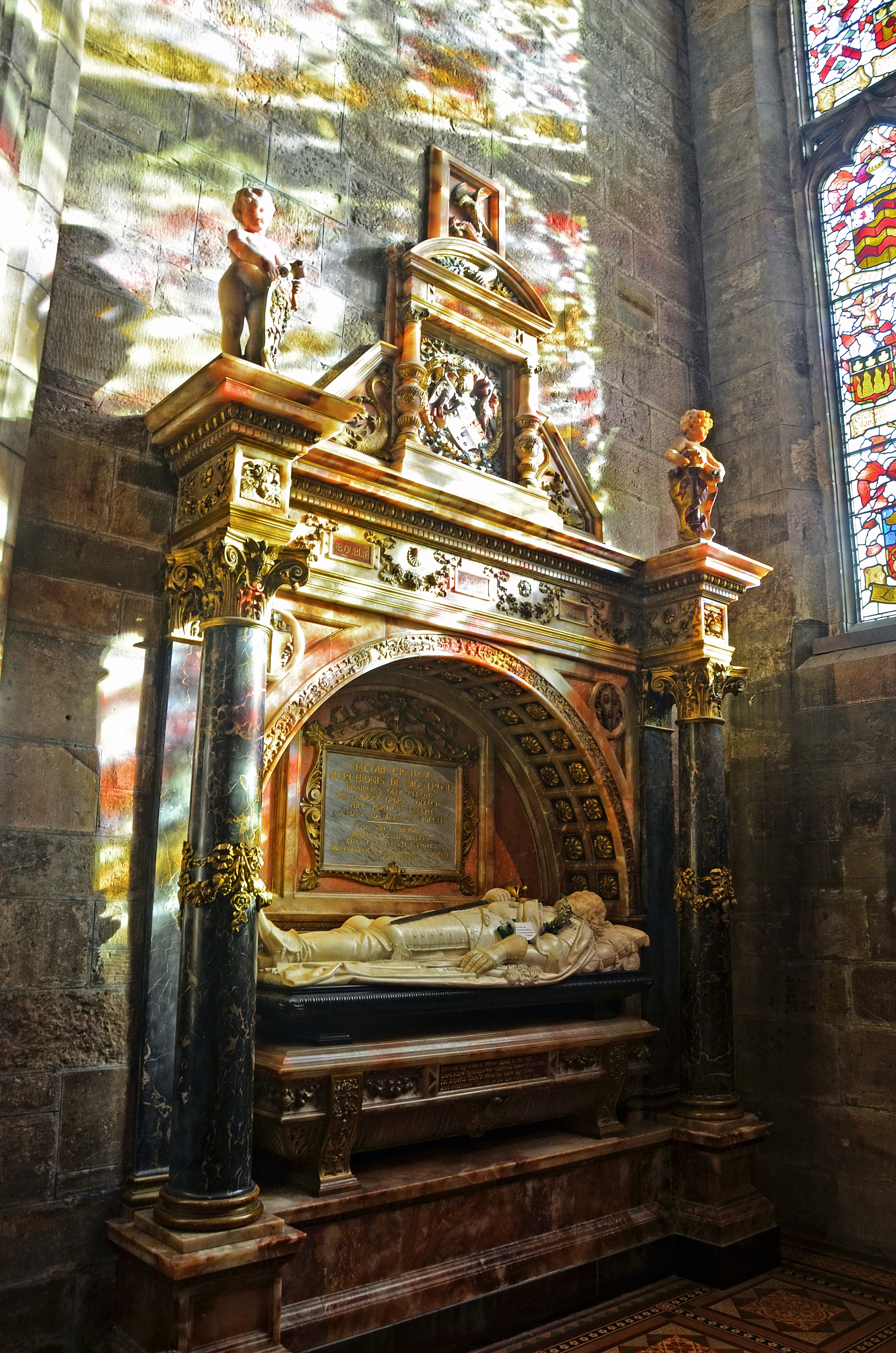
19th century monument to the Marquess of Montrose

The events of 23 July 1637 led to the signing of the National Covenant in February 1638, which, in turn, led to the Bishops' Wars, the first conflict of the Wars of the Three Kingdoms. St Giles' again became a Presbyterian church and the partitions were restored. Before 1643, the Preston Aisle was also fitted out as a permanent meeting place for the General Assembly of the Church of Scotland.

In autumn 1641, Charles I attended Presbyterian services in the East Kirk under the supervision of its minister, Alexander Henderson, a leading Covenanter. The King had lost the Bishops' Wars and had come to Edinburgh because the Treaty of Ripon compelled him to ratify Acts of the Parliament of Scotland passed during the ascendancy of the Covenanters.

After the Covenanters' loss at the Battle of Dunbar, troops of the Commonwealth of England under Oliver Cromwell entered Edinburgh and occupied the East Kirk as a garrison church. General John Lambert and Cromwell himself were among English soldiers who preached in the church and, during the Protectorate, the East Kirk and Tolbooth Kirk were each partitioned in two.

At the Restoration in 1660, the Cromwellian partition was removed from the East Kirk and a new royal loft was installed there. In 1661, the Parliament of Scotland, under Charles II, restored episcopacy and St Giles' became a cathedral again. At Charles' orders, the body of James Graham, 1st Marquess of Montrose – a senior supporter of Charles I executed by the Covenanters – was re-interred in St Giles'. The reintroduction of bishops sparked a new period of rebellion and, in the wake of the Battle of Rullion Green in 1666, Covenanters were imprisoned in the former priests' prison above the north door, which, by then, had become known as "Haddo's Hole" due to the imprisonment there in 1644 of Royalist leader Sir John Gordon, 1st Baronet, of Haddo.

After the Glorious Revolution, the Scottish bishops remained loyal to James VII. On the advice of William Carstares, who later became minister of the High Kirk, William II supported the abolition of bishops in the Church of Scotland and, in 1689, the Parliament of Scotland restored Presbyterian polity. In response, many ministers and congregants left the Church of Scotland, effectively establishing the independent Scottish Episcopal Church. In Edinburgh alone, eleven meeting houses of this secession sprang up, including the congregation that became Old St Paul's, which was founded when Alexander Rose, the last Bishop of Edinburgh in the established church, led much of his congregation out of St Giles'.

=== Four churches in one: 1689–1843 ===
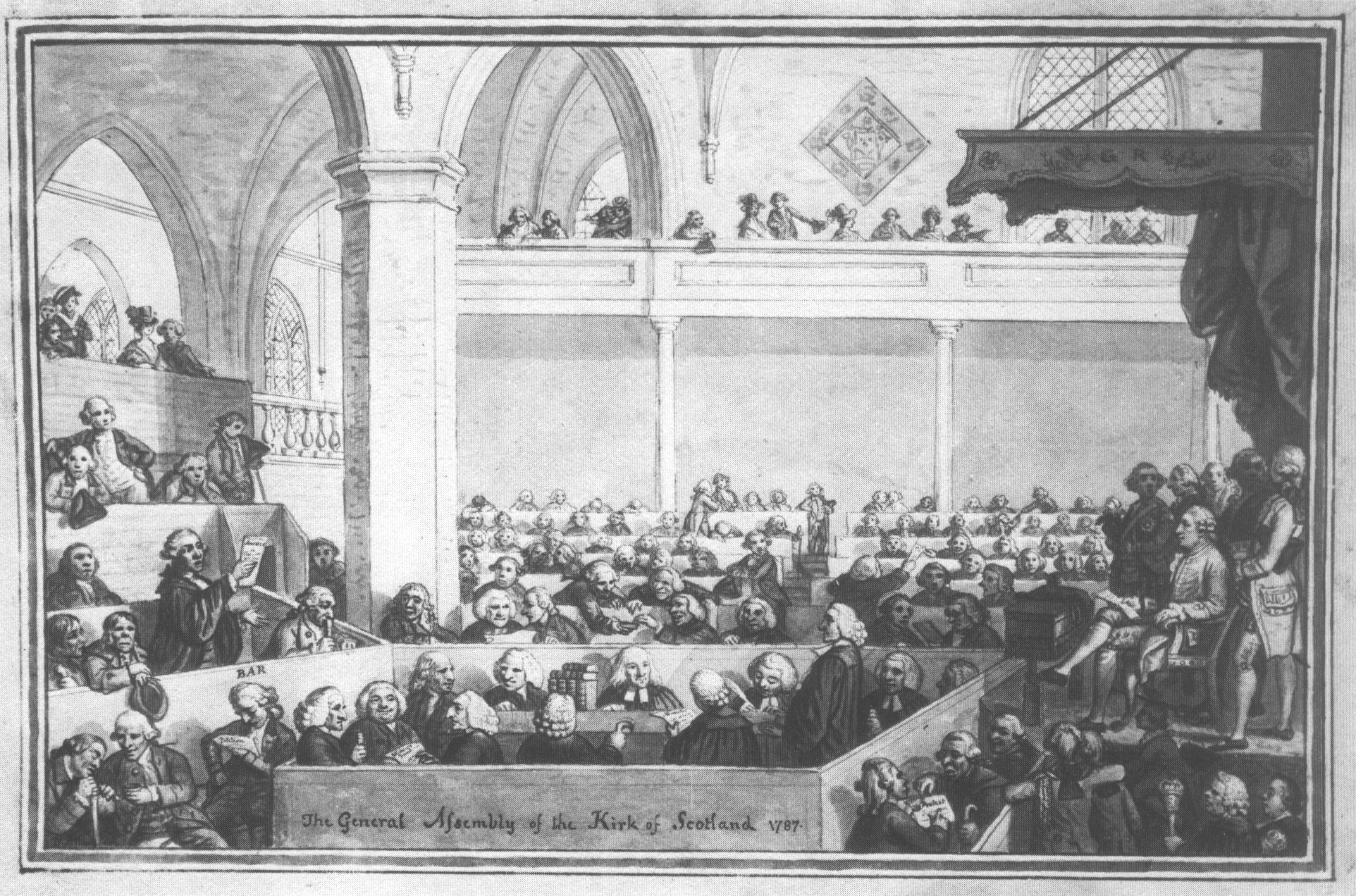
The General Assembly of 1787, held in the Preston Aisle of St Giles'

In 1699, the courtroom in the northern half of the Tolbooth partition was converted into the New North (or Haddo's Hole) Kirk. At the Union of Scotland and England's Parliaments in 1707, the tune "Why Should I Be Sad on my Wedding Day?" rang out from St Giles' recently installed carillon. During the Jacobite rising of 1745, inhabitants of Edinburgh met in St Giles' and agreed to surrender the city to the advancing army of Charles Edward Stuart.

From 1758 to 1800, Hugh Blair, a leading figure of the Scottish Enlightenment and religious moderate, served as minister of the High Kirk; his sermons were famous throughout Britain and attracted Robert Burns and Samuel Johnson to the church. Blair's contemporary, Alexander Webster, was a leading evangelical who, from his pulpit in the Tolbooth Kirk, expounded strict Calvinist doctrine.

At the beginning of the 19th century, the Luckenbooths and Tolbooth, which had enclosed the north side of the church, were demolished along with shops built up around the walls of the church. The exposure of the church's exterior revealed its walls were leaning outwards. In 1817, the city council commissioned Archibald Elliot to produce plans for the church's restoration. Elliot's drastic plans proved controversial and, due to a lack of funds, nothing was done with them.

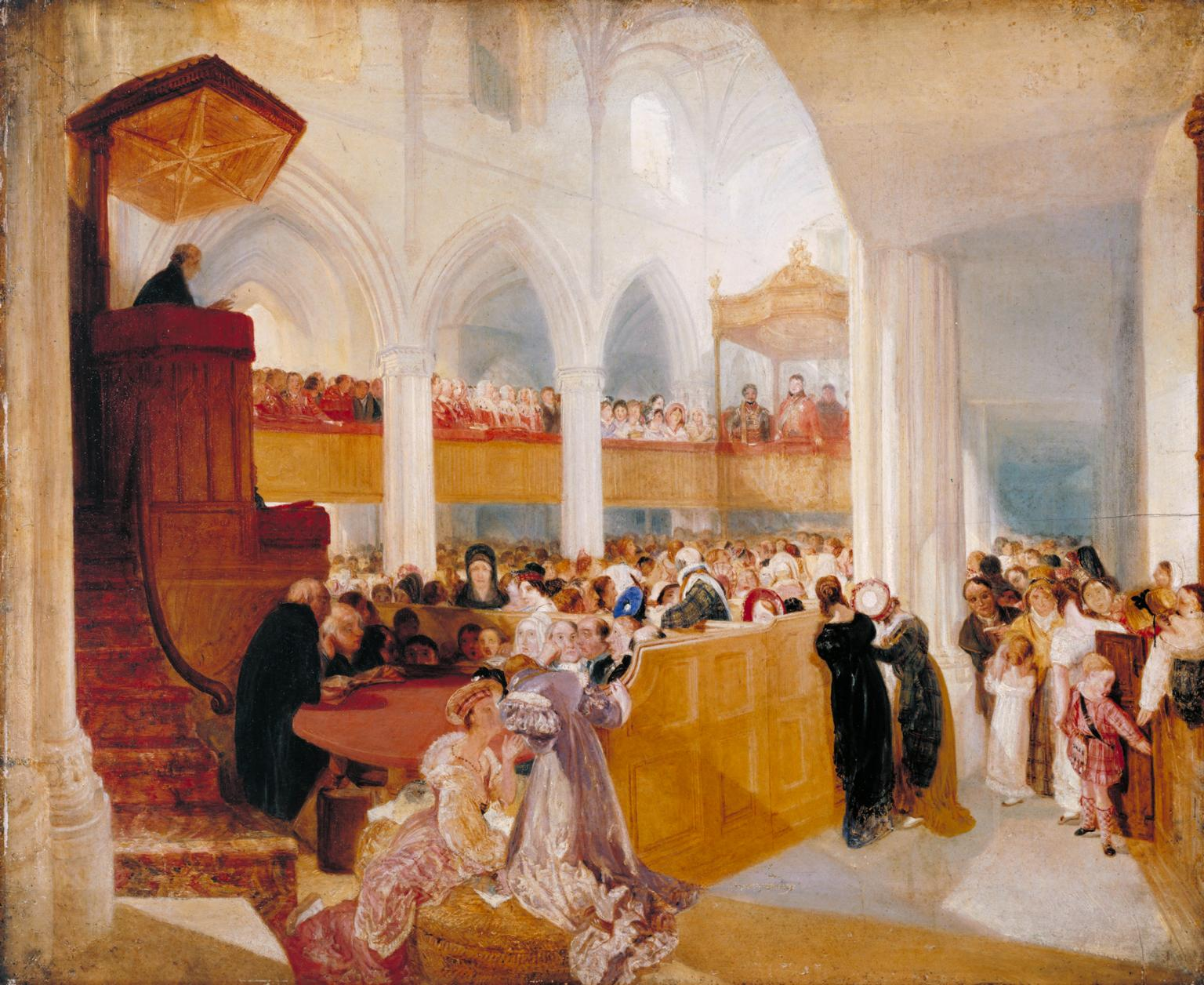
The High Kirk during the visit of George IV in 1822

George IV attended service in the High Kirk during his 1822 visit to Scotland. The publicity of the King's visit created impetus to restore the now-dilapidated building. With £20,000 supplied by the city council and the government, William Burn was commissioned to lead the restoration. Burn's initial plans were modest, but, under pressure from the authorities, Burn produced something closer to Elliot's plans.

Between 1829 and 1833, Burn significantly altered the church: he encased the exterior in ashlar, raised the church's roofline and reduced its footprint. He also added north and west doors and moved the internal partitions to create a church in the nave, a church in the choir, and a meeting place for the General Assembly of the Church of Scotland in the southern portion. Between these, the crossing and north transept formed a large vestibule. Burn also removed internal monuments; the General Assembly's meeting place in the Preston Aisle; and the police office and fire engine house, the building's last secular spaces.

Burn's contemporaries were split between those who congratulated him on creating a cleaner, more stable building and those who regretted what had been lost or altered. In the Victorian era and the first half of the 20th century, Burn's work fell far from favour among commentators. Its critics included Robert Louis Stevenson, who stated: "…zealous magistrates and a misguided architect have shorn the design of manhood and left it poor, naked, and pitifully pretentious." Since the second half of the 20th century, Burn's work has been recognised as having secured the church from possible collapse.

The High Kirk returned to the choir in 1831. The Tolbooth Kirk returned to the nave in 1832; when they left for a new church on Castlehill in 1843, the nave was occupied by the Haddo's Hole congregation. The General Assembly found its new meeting hall inadequate and met there only once, in 1834; the Old Kirk congregation moved into the space.

=== Victorian era ===
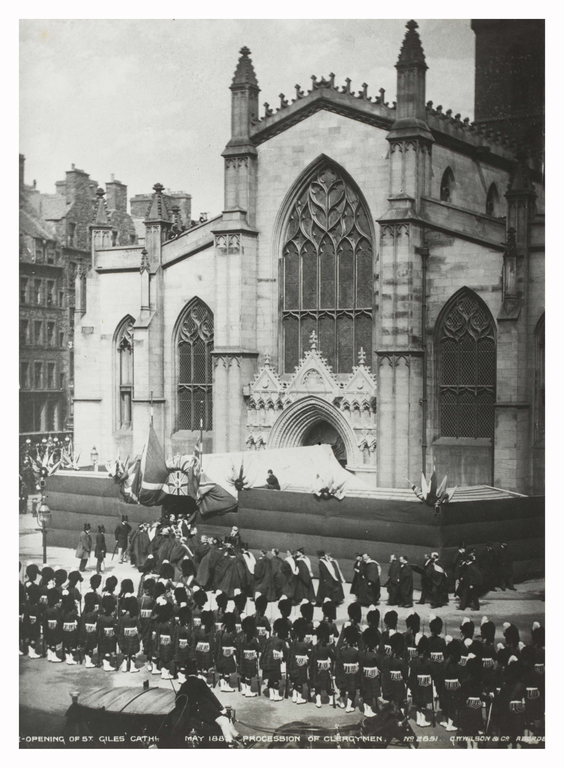
Clergy enter St Giles' at its ceremonial re-opening after the Chambers restoration on 23 May 1883

At the Disruption of 1843, Robert Gordon and James Buchanan, ministers of the High Kirk, left their charges and the established church to join the newly founded Free Church. (Note: Gordon and Buchanan led out a congregation known as the Free High Kirk. Initially, the congregation met at the Music Hall on George Street before moving to what is now the library of New College, Edinburgh; in 1935, the congregation moved to Reid Memorial Church in Blackford.) A significant number of their congregation left with them; as did William King Tweedie, minister of the first charge of the Tolbooth Kirk, (Note: Tweedie led most of his congregation out of St Giles, creating the Tolbooth Free congregation. They first met in Niddrie Street before moving to a building on Infirmary Street, where they worshipped from 1843 to 1852. They then worshipped in the Music Hall on George Street before moving to their own building on St Andrew's Square in 1858. In 1891, the congregation united with St Luke's Free Church to form Queen Street Free Church, based in the St Luke's buildings on Queen Street.) and Charles John Brown, minister of Haddo's Hole Kirk. The Old Kirk congregation was suppressed in 1860. (Note: Although no new minister was appointed to the Old Kirk, a congregation continued to meet in the southern portion of St Giles' and David Arnot, minister of the High Kirk, served as its interim moderator. In 1869, the congregation moved to a hall in Blackfriars Street then to a new church on the corner of St John's Street and Holyrood Road, off the Canongate, in 1882. The congregation moved to Crewe Toll in 1941 and to Pilton in 1952. In 2014, the congregation united with St Andrew's, Muirhouse to form the Old Kirk and Muirhouse Parish Church.)

At a public meeting in Edinburgh City Chambers on 1 November 1867, William Chambers, publisher and Lord Provost of Edinburgh, first advanced his ambition to remove the internal partitions and restore St Giles' as a "Westminster Abbey for Scotland". Chambers commissioned Robert Morham to produce initial plans. Lindsay Mackersy, solicitor and session clerk of the High Kirk, supported Chambers' work and William Hay was engaged as architect; a management board to supervise the design of new windows and monuments was also created.

The restoration was part of a movement for liturgical beautification in late 19th century Scottish Presbyterianism and many evangelicals feared the restored St Giles' would more resemble a Roman Catholic church than a Presbyterian one. Nevertheless, the Presbytery of Edinburgh approved plans in March 1870 and the High Kirk was restored between June 1872 and March 1873: the pews and gallery were replaced with stalls and chairs and, for the first time since the Reformation, stained glass and an organ were introduced.

The restoration of the former Old Kirk and the West Kirk began in January 1879. In 1881, the West Kirk vacated St. Giles'. During the restoration, many human remains were unearthed; these were transported in five large boxes for reinterment in Greyfriars Kirkyard. Although he had managed to view the reunified interior, William Chambers died on 20 May 1883, only three days before John Hamilton-Gordon, 7th Earl of Aberdeen, Lord High Commissioner to the General Assembly of the Church of Scotland, ceremonially opened the restored church; Chambers' funeral was held in the church two days after its reopening.

=== 20th and 21st centuries ===
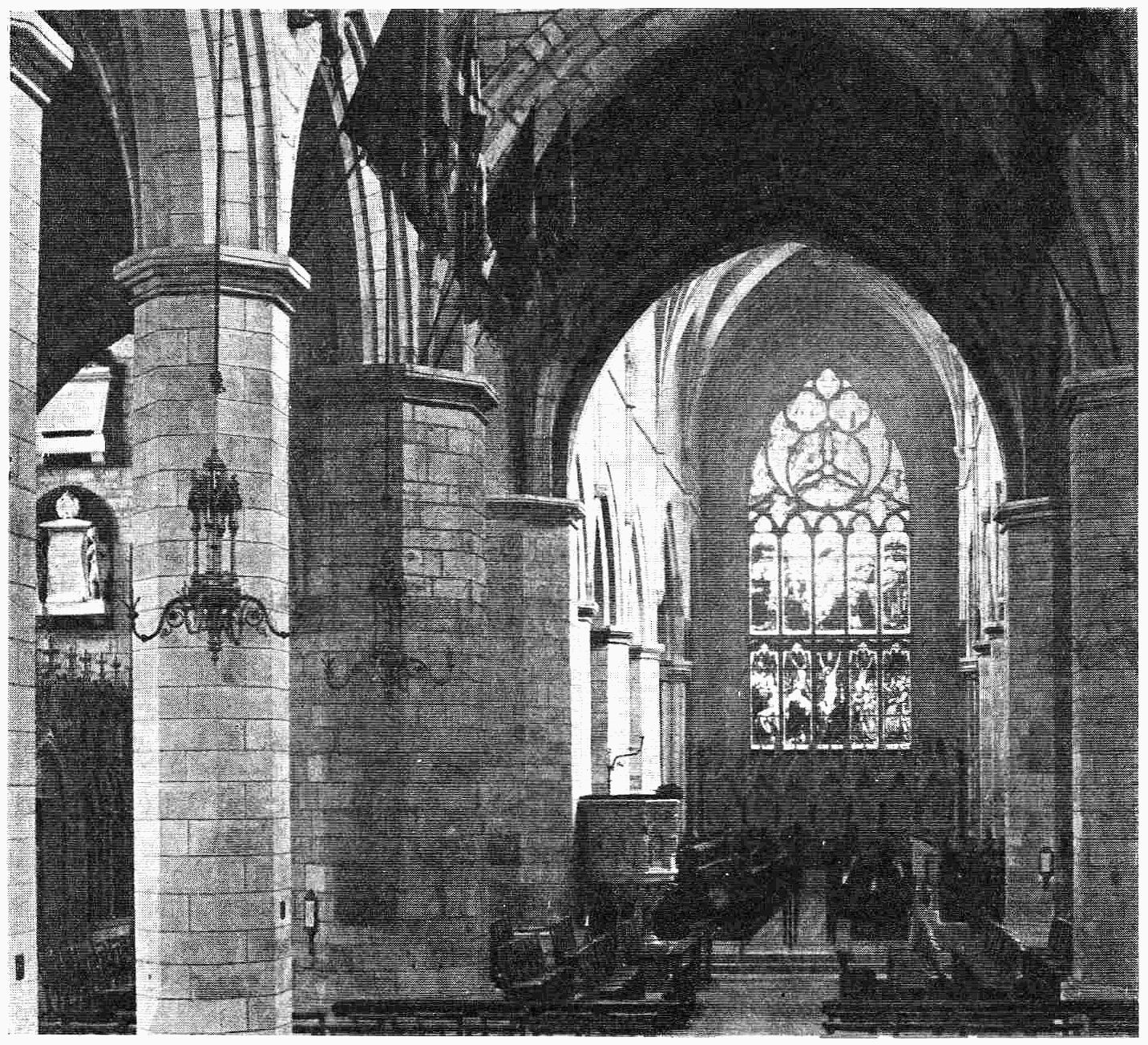
The interior at the beginning of the 20th century, looking east from the nave

In 1911, George V opened the newly constructed chapel of the knights of the Order of the Thistle at the south east corner of the church.

Though the church had hosted a special service for the Church League for Women's Suffrage, Wallace Williamson’s refusal to pray for imprisoned suffragettes led to their supporters disrupting services during late 1913 and early 1914.

Ninety-nine members of the congregation – including the assistant minister, Matthew Marshall – were killed in World War I. In 1917, St Giles' hosted the lying-in-state and funeral of Elsie Inglis, medical pioneer and member of the congregation.

Ahead of the 1929 reunion of the United Free Church of Scotland and the Church of Scotland, the Church of Scotland (Property and Endowments) Act 1925 transferred ownership of St Giles' from the City of Edinburgh Council to the Church of Scotland.

The church escaped World War II undamaged. The week after VE Day, the royal family attended a thanksgiving service in St Giles'. The Albany Aisle at the north west of the church was subsequently adapted to serve as a memorial chapel to the 39 members of the congregation killed in the conflict.

To mark her first visit to Scotland since her coronation, Elizabeth II received the Honours of Scotland at a national service of thanksgiving in St Giles' on 24 June 1953.

From 1973 to 2013, Gilleasbuig Macmillan served as minister of St Giles'. During Macmillan's incumbency, the church was restored and the interior reoriented around a central communion table, the interior floor was levelled and undercroft space was created by Bernard Feilden.

St Giles' remains an active parish church as well as hosting concerts, special services, and events. In 2018, St Giles' was the fourth most popular visitor site in Scotland with over 1.3 million visitors that year.

On 12 September 2022, the coffin of the late Queen Elizabeth II was taken to the cathedral for a service of thanksgiving, having travelled from Balmoral Castle to the Palace of Holyroodhouse the previous day. The Queen's coffin then lay at rest at the cathedral for 24 hours, guarded constantly by the Royal Company of Archers, allowing the people of Scotland to pay their respects. In the evening, the Queen's children; King Charles III, the Princess Royal, the Earl of Inverness (later Andrew Mountbatten-Windsor) and the Earl of Forfar held a vigil at the cathedral, a custom known as the Vigil of the Princes.

On 5 July 2023, the Honours of Scotland were presented to King Charles III in a ceremony held in St Giles' Cathedral. The ceremony was formally described as a National Service of Thanksgiving and Dedication to mark the coronation of King Charles III and Queen Camilla.

== Architecture ==
"No other Scottish church has so tangled an architectural history."

— Ian Hannah, The Story of Scotland in Stone (1934)

The first St Giles' was likely a small, Romanesque building of the 12th century with a rectangular nave and semi-circular apsidal chancel. Before the middle of the 13th century, an aisle was added to the south of the church. Archaeological excavations in the 1980s found the 12th-century church was likely constructed of pink sandstone and grey whinstone. The excavations, found the first church was built on a substantial clay platform created to level the steep slope of the area. This platform was surrounded by a boundary ditch.

By 1385, this building had likely been replaced by the core of the current church: a nave and aisles of five bays, a crossing and transepts, and a choir of four bays. The church was extended in stages between 1387 and 1518. In Richard Fawcett's words, this "almost haphazard addition of large numbers of chapels" produced "an extraordinarily complex plan". The resultant profusion of outer aisles is typical of French medieval church architecture but unusual in Britain.

Apart from the internal partitioning of the church in the wake of the Reformation, few significant alterations were made until the restoration by William Burn in 1829–1833, which included the removal of several bays of the church, the addition of clerestories to the nave and transepts, and the encasement of the church's exterior in polished ashlar. The church was significantly restored under William Hay between 1872 and 1883, including the removal of the last internal partitions. In the late 19th century, a number of ground level rooms were added around the periphery of the church. The Thistle Chapel was added to the south-east corner of the church by Robert Lorimer in 1909–11. The most significant subsequent restoration commenced in 1979 under Bernard Feilden and Simpson & Brown: this included the levelling of the floor and the rearrangement of the interior around a central communion table.

=== Exterior ===
The exterior of the church, with the exception of the tower, dates almost entirely from William Burn's restoration of 1829–1833 and afterwards. Prior to this restoration, St Giles' possessed what Richard Fawcett called a "uniquely complex external appearance" as the result of the church's numerous extensions; externally, a number of chapels were emphasised by gables.

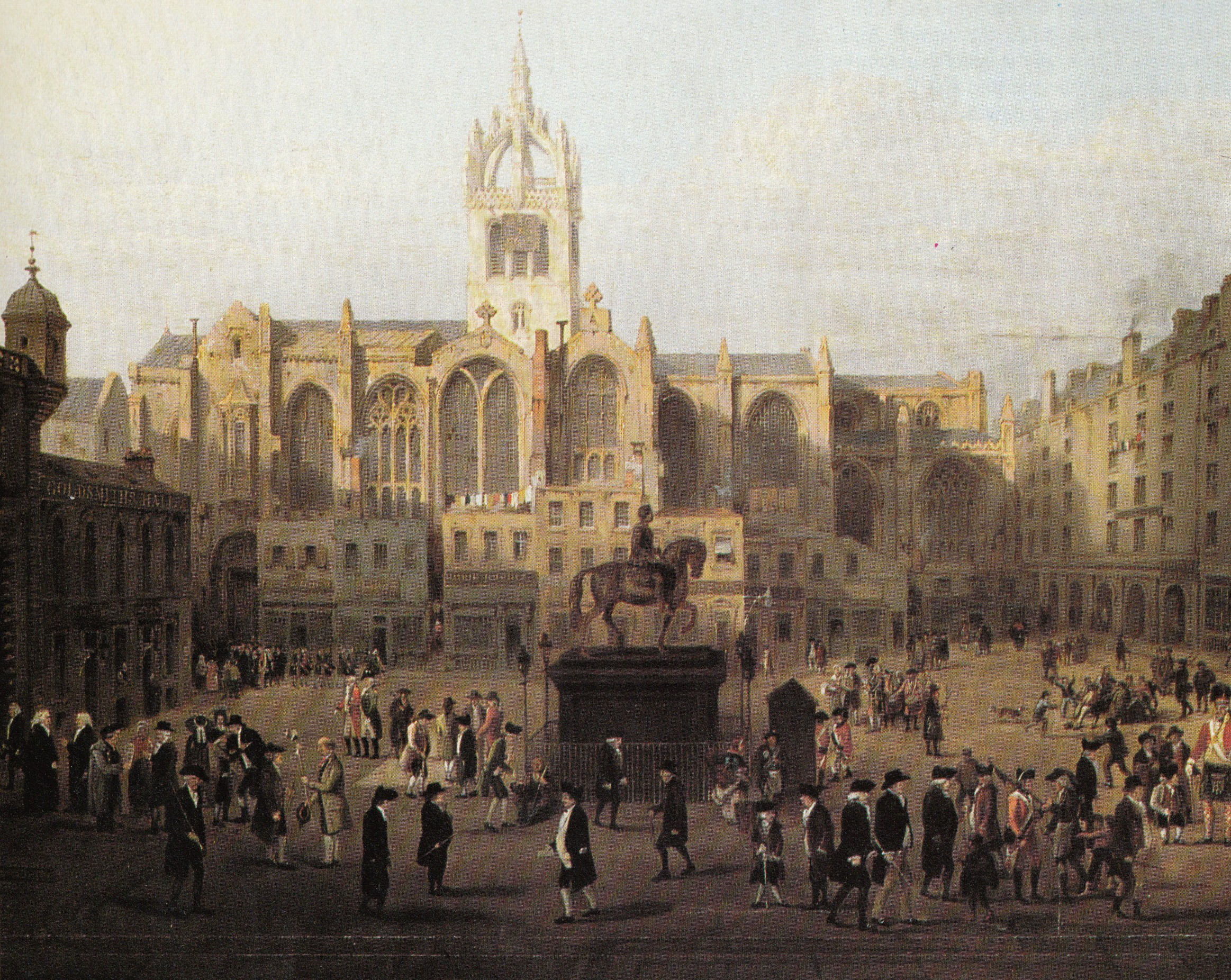
The south side of St Giles' prior to the Burn restoration

Following the early 19th-century demolition of the Luckenbooths, Tolbooth, and shops built against St Giles', the walls of the church were exposed to be leaning outward by as much as one and a half feet in places. Burn encased the exterior of the building in polished ashlar of gray sandstone from Cullalo in Fife. This layer is tied to the existing walls by iron cramps and varies in width from eight inches (20 centimetres) at the base of the walls to five inches (13 centimetres) at the top. Burn co-operated with Robert Reid, the architect of new buildings in Parliament Square, to ensure the exteriors of their buildings would complement each other. Burn significantly altered the profile of the church: he expanded the transepts, created a clerestory in the nave, added new doorways in the west front and north and south transepts, and replicated the cusped cresting from the east end of the church throughout the parapet. Alongside the Thistle Chapel, extensions since the Burn restoration include William Hay's additions of 1883: rooms south of the Moray Aisle, east of the south transept, and west of the north transept; in 1891, MacGibbon and Ross added a ladies’ vestry – now the shop – at the east of the north transept.

Burn created a symmetrical western façade by replacing the west window of the Albany Aisle at the northwest corner of the church with a double niche and by moving the west window of the inner south nave aisle to repeat this arrangement in the southern half. The west doorway dates from the Victorian restoration and is by William Hay: the doorway is flanked by niches containing small statues of Scottish monarchs and their consorts (from left to right, Alexander I, David I, Alexander III, Saint Margaret, Margaret Tudor, Robert the Bruce, James I and James IV) and churchmen (from left to right, Gawin Douglas, John Knox, William Forbes and Alexander Henderson) by John Rhind, who also carved the relief of Saint Giles in the tympanum. The metalwork of the west door is by Skidmore. In 2006, new steps and an access ramp were added to the west door by Morris and Steedman Associates.

In order to improve access to Parliament Square, Burn demolished the westernmost two bays of the outer south nave aisle, including the south porch and door. Burn also removed the western bay from the Holy Blood Aisle at the south of the church and, from the north side of the nave, removed the north porch along with an adjoining bay. The lost porches likely dated from the late-15th century and were matched only by those at St John's Kirk, Perth and St Michael's Kirk, Linlithgow as the grandest two-storey porches on Scottish medieval churches. Like the porch at Linlithgow, on which they were likely based, the porches at St Giles' possessed an entry arch below an oriel window. Burn replicated this arrangement in a new doorway at the west of the Moray Aisle.

On visiting the church prior to the Burn restoration, Thomas Rickman wrote: "... a few of the windows have the tracery remaining, but from most of them it has been cut away." Views of the church before the Burn restoration show intersecting tracery in some of the choir windows and looping patterns in the windows of the Holy Blood Aisle. Burn retained the tracery of the great east window, which had been restored by John Mylne the Younger in the mid-17th century. In the other windows Burn inserted new tracery based on late medieval Scottish examples.

Exterior

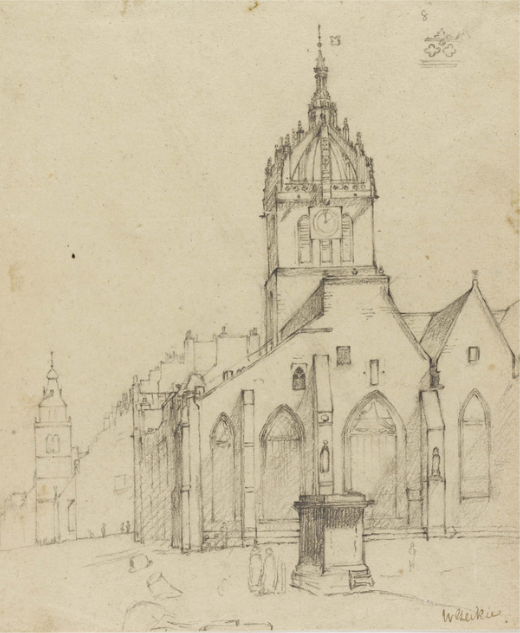
The west front prior to the Burn restoration

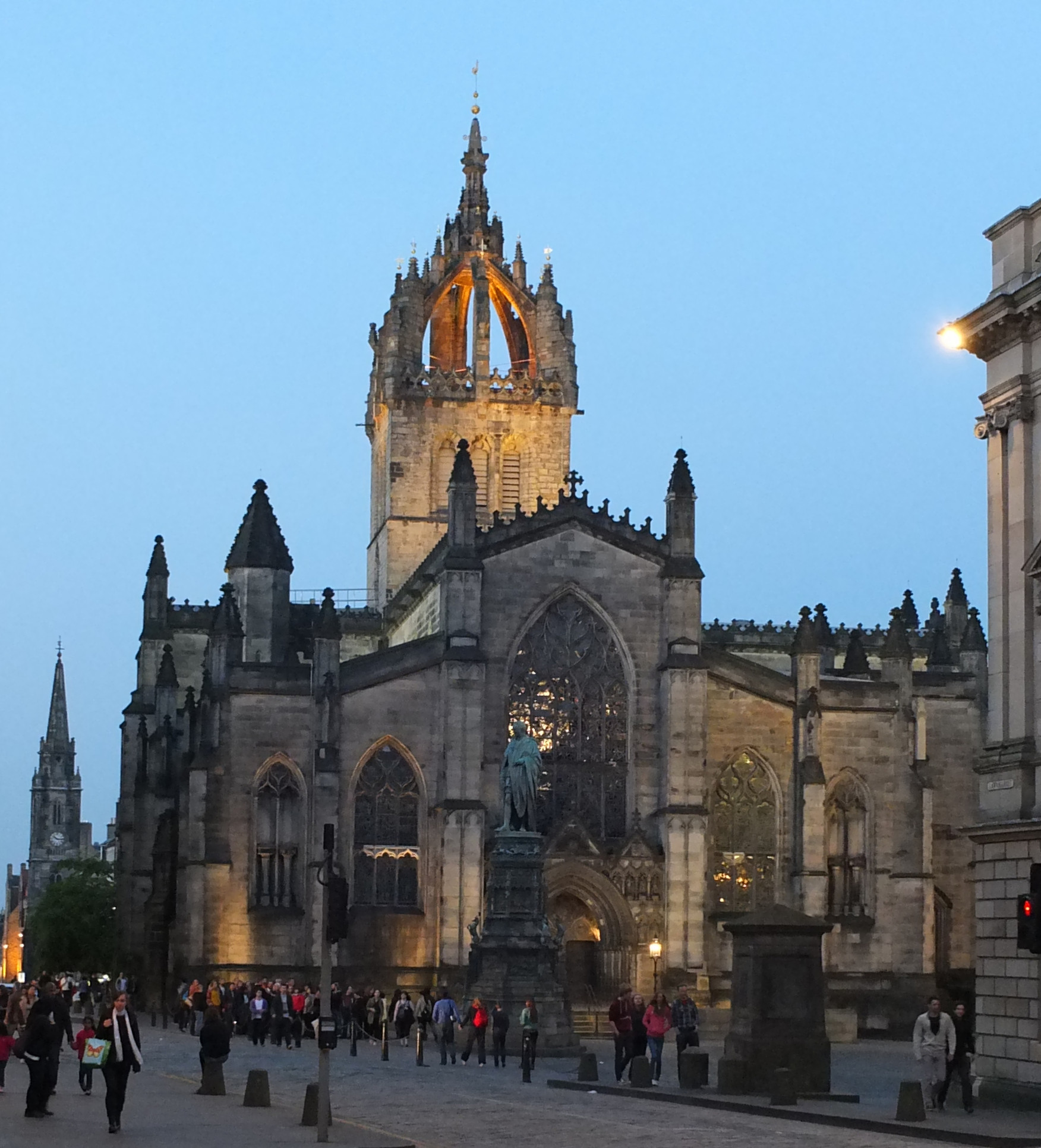
The west front of the church in the 21st century, showing the effects of the Burn restoration

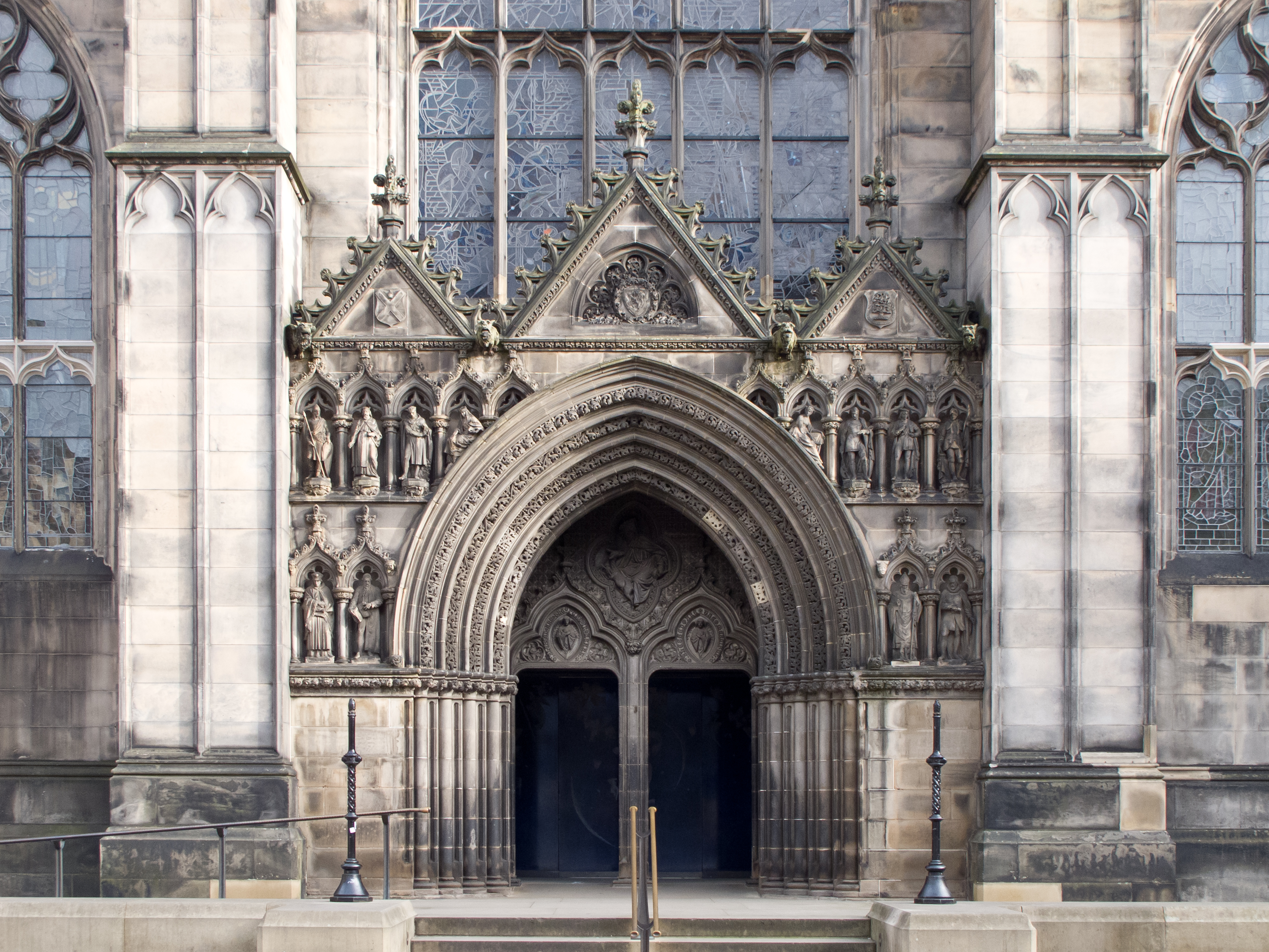
The Victorian west doorway, designed by William Hay with statues carved by John Rhind

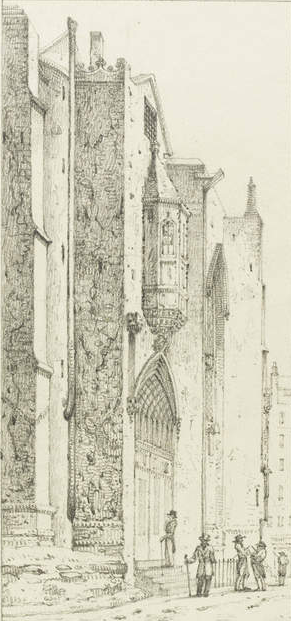
The 15th century south porch, demolished during the Burn restoration

=== Tower and crown steeple ===
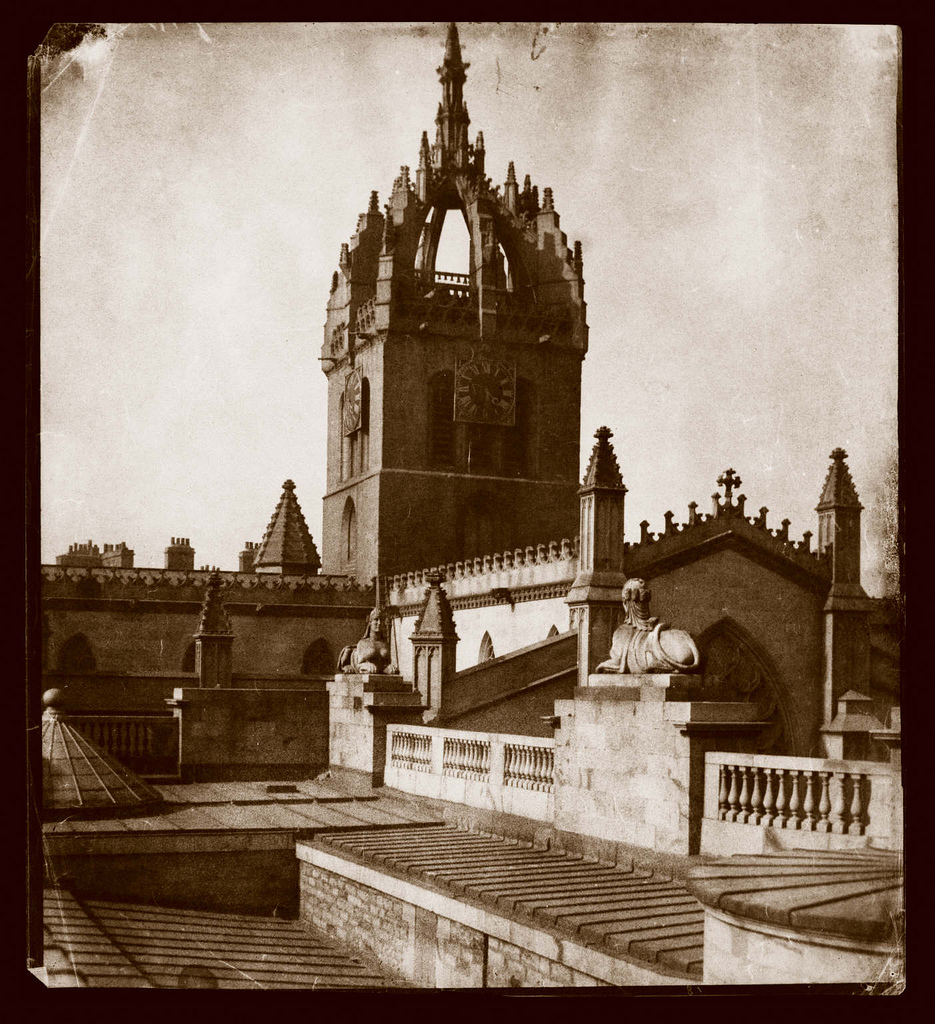
St Giles' tower in the Victorian era, showing the clock faces removed in 1911

St Giles' possesses a central tower over its crossing: this arrangement is common in larger Scottish medieval secular churches. The tower was constructed in two stages. The lower section of the tower has lancet openings with Y-shaped tracery on every side. This had likely been completed by 1416, in which year the Scotichronicon records storks nesting there. The upper stage of the tower has clusters of three cusped lancet openings on each side. The date of this work is uncertain, but it may relate both to fines levied on building works at St Giles' in 1486 and to rules of 1491 for the master mason and his men. From at least 1590, there was a clock face on the tower and, by 1655, there were three faces. The clock faces were removed in 1911.

St Giles' crown steeple is one of Edinburgh's most famous and distinctive landmarks. Cameron Lees wrote of the steeple: "Edinburgh would not be Edinburgh without it." Dendrochronological analysis dates the crown steeple to between 1460 and 1467. (Note: The dendrochronological evidence challenges most architectural histories, which date the crown steeple to the turn of the 16th century.) The steeple is one of two surviving medieval crown steeples in Scotland: the other is at King's College Chapel, Aberdeen and dates from after 1505. John Hume called St Giles' crown steeple "a serene reminder of the imperial aspirations of the late Stewart monarchs". The design, however, is English in origin, being found at St Nicholas' Church, Newcastle before it was introduced to Scotland at St Giles'; the medieval St Mary-le-Bow, London, may also have possessed a crown steeple. Another crown steeple existed at St Michael's Parish Church, Linlithgow until 1821 and others may have been planned, and possibly begun, at the parish churches of Haddington and Dundee. These other examples are composed only of diagonal flying buttresses springing from the four corners of the tower; whereas the St Giles' steeple is unique among medieval crown steeples in being composed of eight buttresses: four springing from the corners and four springing from the centre of each side of the tower.

For the arrival into Edinburgh of Anne of Denmark in 1590, 21 weather vanes were added to the crests of the steeple; these were removed prior to 1800 and replacements were installed in 2005. The steeple was repaired by John Mylne the Younger in 1648. Mylne added pinnacles half-way up the crests of the buttresses; he is also largely responsible for the present appearance of the central pinnacle and may have rebuilt the tower's traceried parapet. The weathercock atop the central pinnacle was created by Alexander Anderson in 1667; it replaced an earlier weathercock of 1567 by Alexander Honeyman.

=== Nave ===
The Buildings of Scotland series calls the nave "archaeologically the most complicated part of church". Though the nave dates to the 14th century and is one of the oldest parts of the church, it has been significantly altered and extended since.

The ceiling over the central section of the nave is a tierceron vault in plaster; this was added during William Burn's restoration of 1829–1833. Burn also heightened the walls of the central section of the nave by 16 feet (4.9 metres), adding windows to create a clerestory. Burn is usually credited with removing a medieval vaulted ceiling from the nave; however, there is no contemporary record of this and it may have been removed before Burn's time. The corbels and shafts leading to the springers of the vaults were added by William Hay in 1882. Burn also removed an attic from above the central section of the nave: this contained several rooms and housed the church's bell-ringer. The outline of the nave roof prior to the Burn restoration can be observed on the wall above the western arch of the crossing.

Hay is also responsible for the present arcade. Burn had earlier heightened the medieval arcade and replaced the octagonal 14th century pillars with pillars based on the 15th century example in the Albany Aisle. Hay replaced these pillars with replicas of the octagonal 14th century pillars of the choir. Originally, the south arcade of the nave was lower with a clerestory window above each arch. The lower height of the original arcade is indicated by a fragment of an arch, springing from the south west pier of the crossing. The arches of the clerestory windows, now filled-in, are still visible above the each arch of the arcade on the south side of the nave. The two arches nearest the crossing at the south nave arcade show taller arches, which likely relate to a medieval scheme to heighten the arcade; however, the presence of these blind arches in only two bays suggests the scheme proved abortive.

Nave

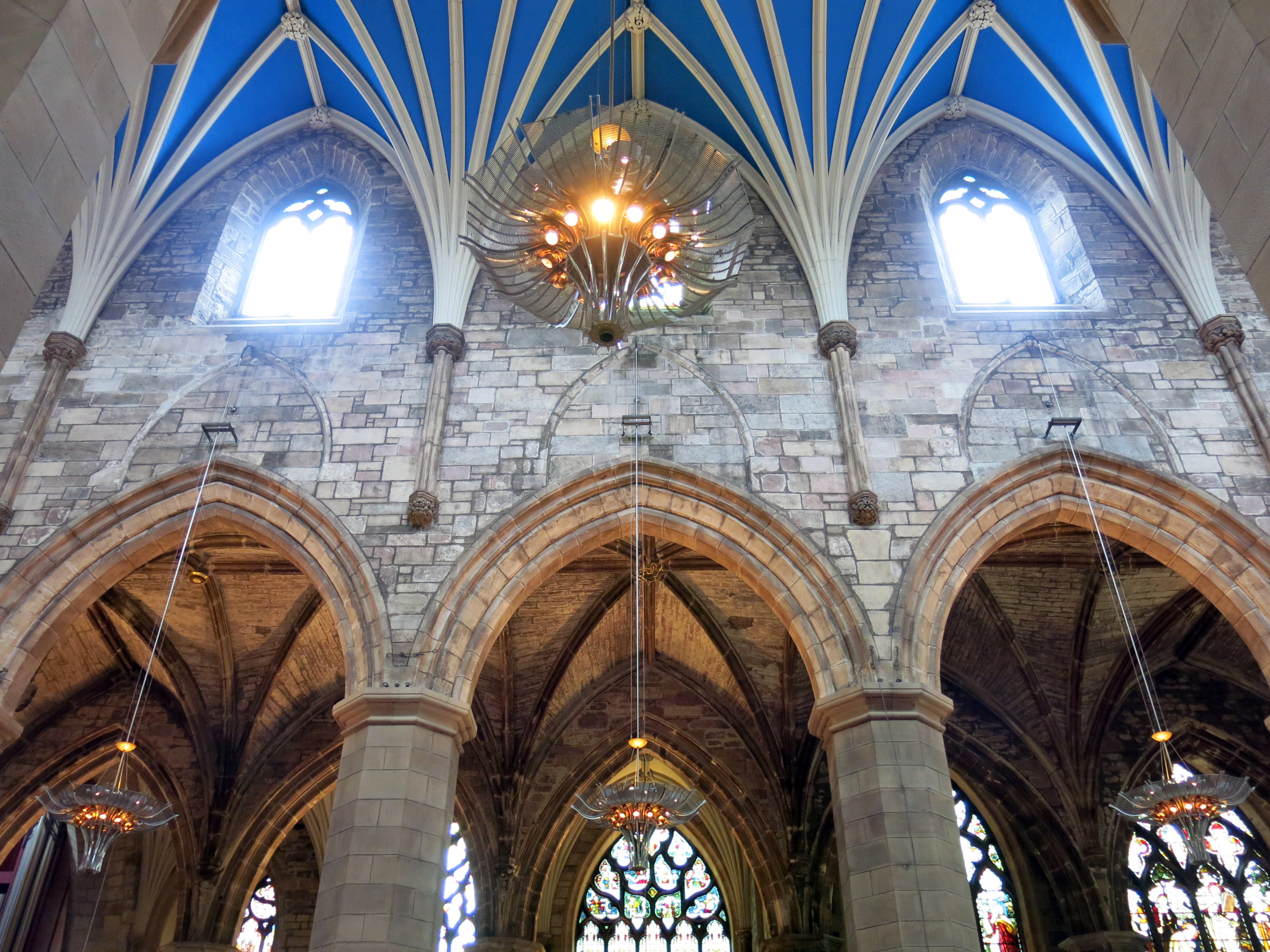
The south side of the nave, showing the plaster vault and clerestory inserted by William Burn and the filled-in arches of the former clerestory

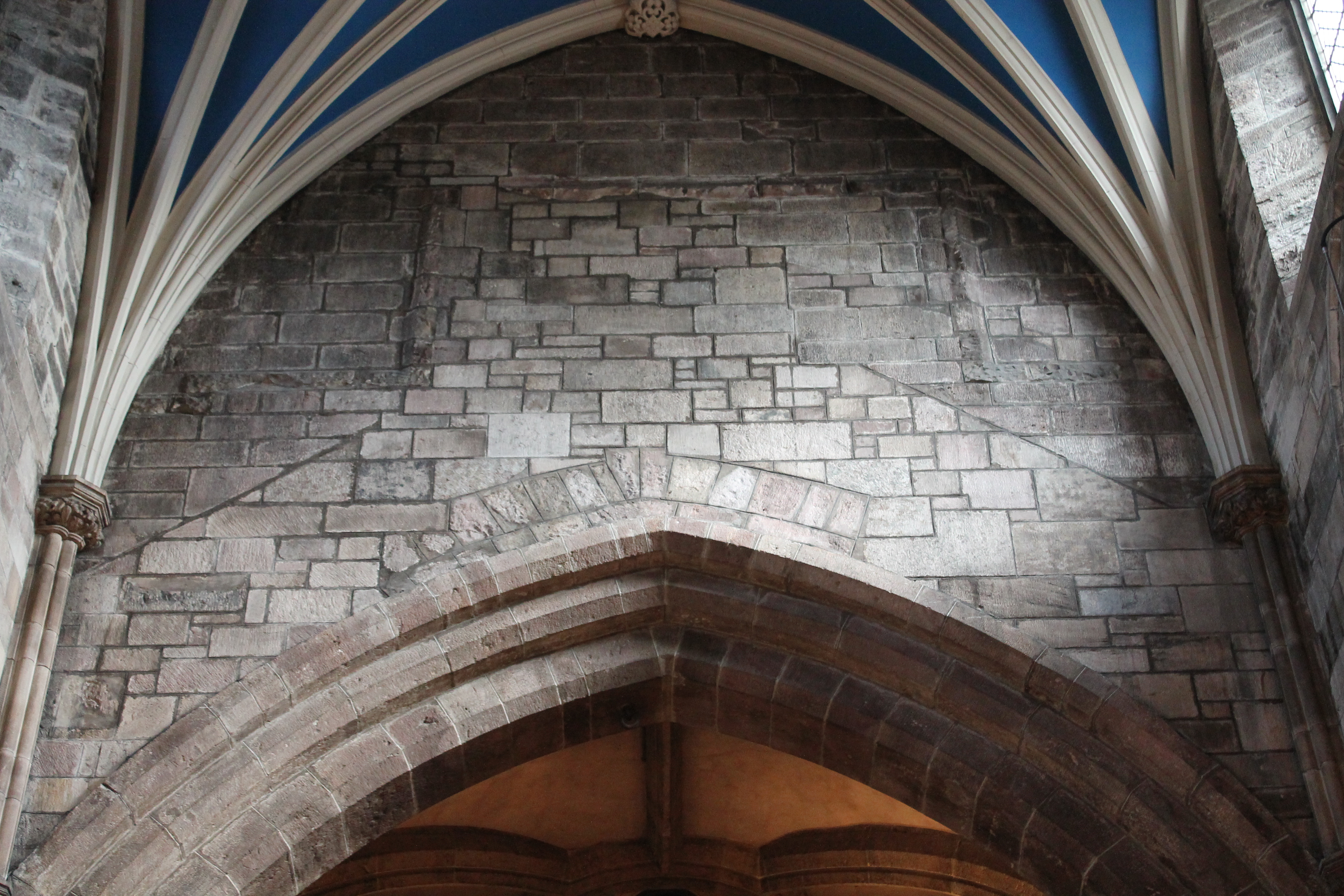
The wall of the tower at the west end of the nave; the outline of the former roof and loft are visible.

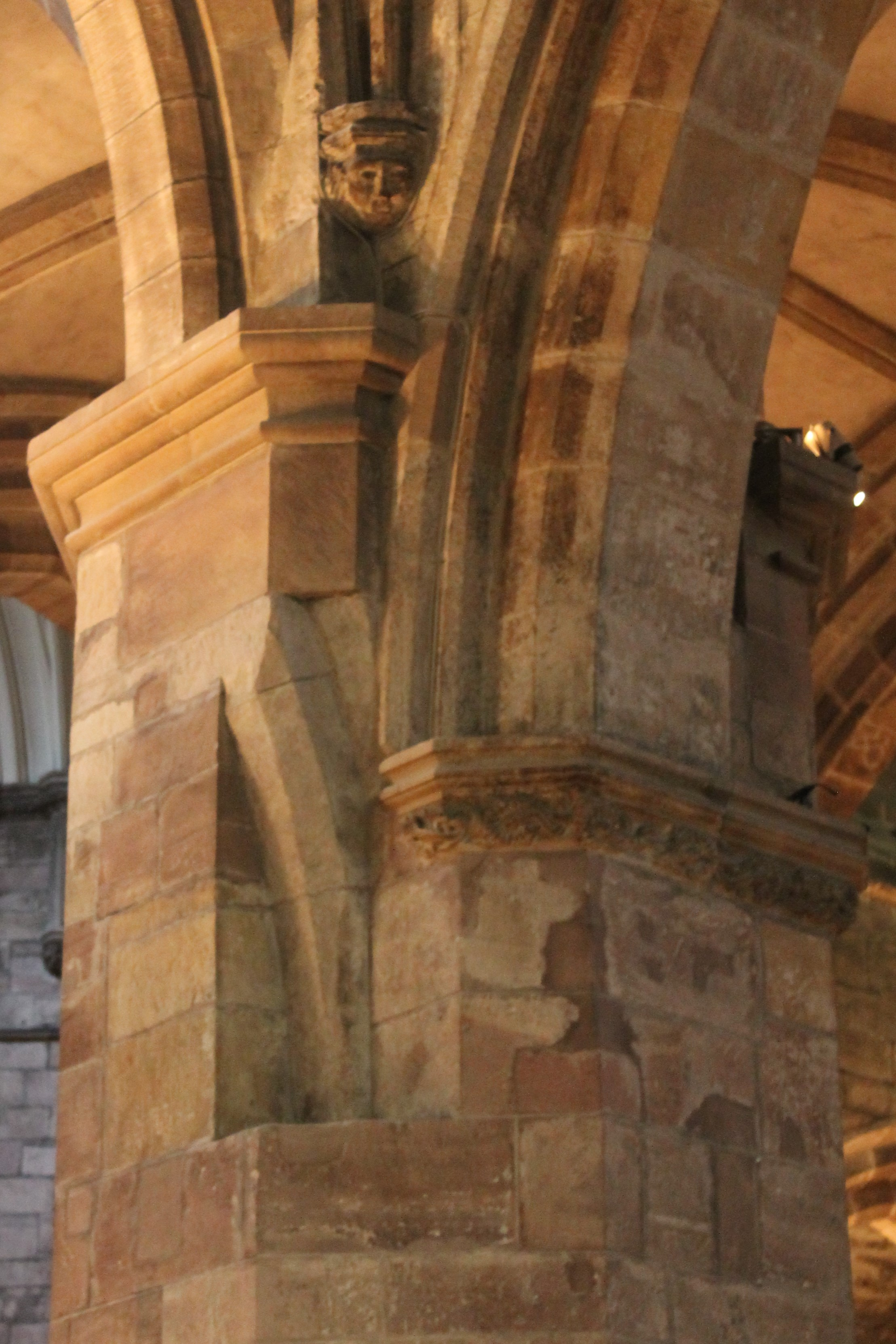
The fragment of an arch in the south west pier of the crossing indicates the original, lower height of the south nave arcade.

=== North nave aisle and chapels ===
The ceiling of the north nave aisle is a rib vault in a similar style to the Albany Aisle: this suggests the north nave aisle dates to the same campaign of building at the turn of the 15th century.

In the first decade of the 15th century, the Albany Aisle was erected as a northward extension of the two westernmost bays of the north nave aisle. The Aisle consists of two bays under a stone rib-vaulted ceiling. The west window of the chapel was blocked up during the Burn restoration of 1829–1833. The north wall of the Aisle contains a semi-circular tomb recess. The ceiling vaults are supported by a bundled pillar that supports a foliate capital and octagonal abacus upon which are the escutcheons of the Aisle's donors: Robert Stewart, Duke of Albany and Archibald Douglas, 4th Earl of Douglas. This is the oldest example of a style of pillar repeated throughout the later additions to St Giles'. Richard Fawcett describes the repetition of this style of pillar and arcading as providing "some measure of control […] to achieve a measure of architectural unity". Neither Albany nor Douglas was closely associated with St Giles' and tradition holds the aisle was donated in penance for their involvement in the death of David Stewart, Duke of Rothesay. In 1882, the floor of the Albany Aisle was paved with Minton tiles, bands of Irish marble, and tiled medallions depicting the arms of Scotland; Robert Stewart, Duke of Albany; and Archibald Douglas, 4th Earl of Douglas. For the Aisle's dedication as a memorial chapel in the wake of the Second World War, the Minton tiles were replaced with Leoch paving stones from Dundee while the heraldic medallions and marble bands were retained.

East of the Albany Aisle, two light-coloured stones below the Black Watch's Egyptian Campaign memorial mark the site of the Norman north door. Until its removal at the end of the 18th century, the doorway was the only feature of the 12th century Romanesque church in situ. (Note: Early sources give the date of the door's removal as 1760 or 1798; alternatively, it may have been removed during work carried out by Robert Burns, mason of Haddo's Hole Kirk, in 1796-97.) An illustration of 1799 shows the doorway as a highly decorated structure, bearing similarities to doorways at the churches of Dalmeny and Leuchars. A porch stood over the site of the north door until the Burn restoration of 1829–1833. This consisted of a chamber over the doorway accessed from the church by a turnpike stair. The lancet arch of the stairway door now frames the Second Battalion Royal Scots Fusiliers' Second Boer War memorial. East of the former doorway is a recessed stoup.

Two chapels formerly stood north of the easternmost two bays of the north nave aisle. Only the easternmost of these, the St Eloi Aisle, survived the Burn restoration. Its ceiling is a barrel vault with superficial ribs: this was installed during William Hay's restoration of 1881–83 and incorporates a boss from the original vault. The archway between the St Eloi Aisle and the north nave aisle is original to the 15th century construction. The west wall of the St Eloi Aisle contains a Romanesque capital from the original church. It was discovered during the clearance of rubble around the medieval east window of the north transept in 1880 and was reset in its present position. The floor of the St Eloi Aisle is marble with mosaic panels by Minton, depicting the emblem the Incorporation of Hammermen between the symbols of the four evangelists.

Nave aisles

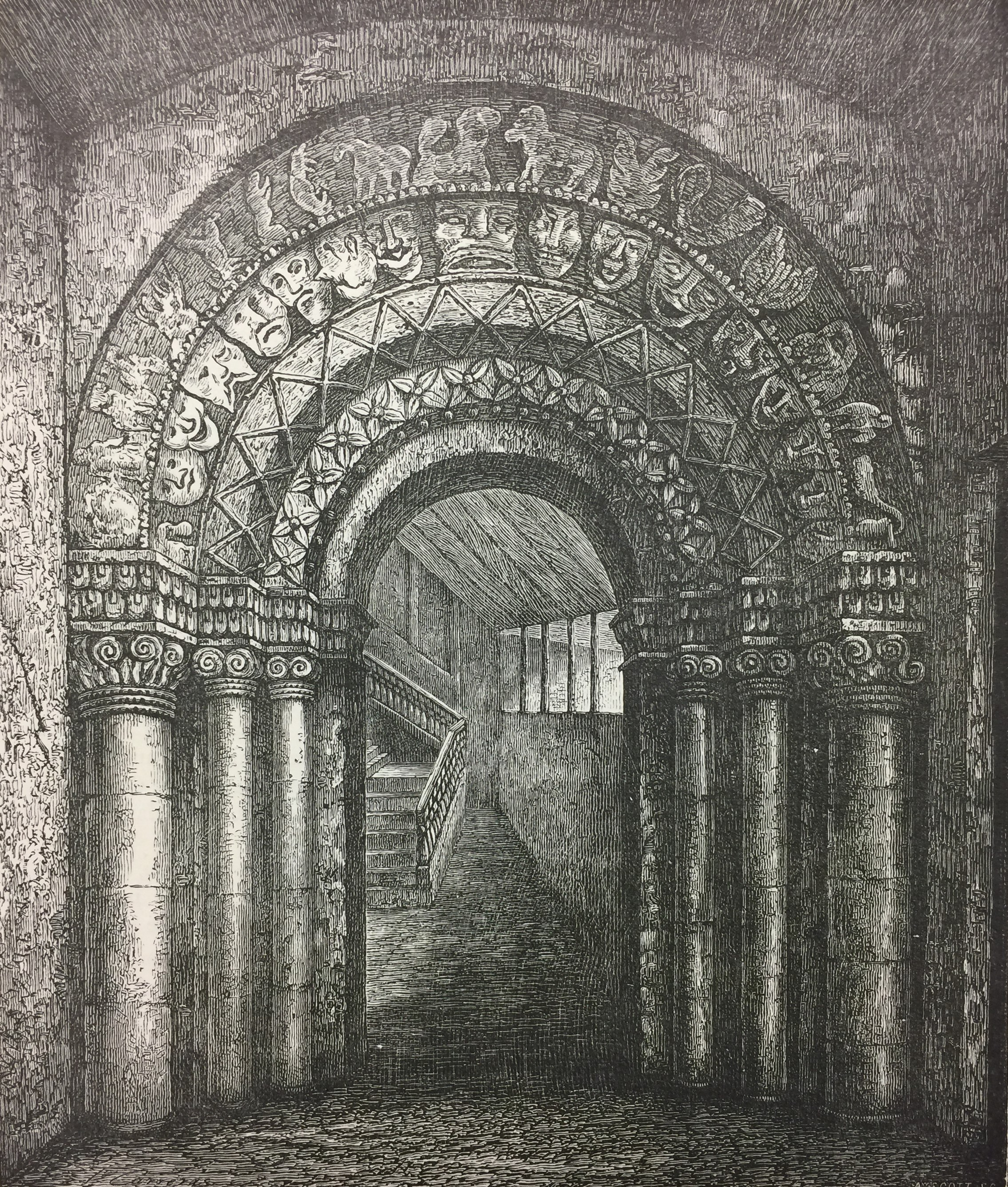
The 12th century north door survived until the end of the 18th century.

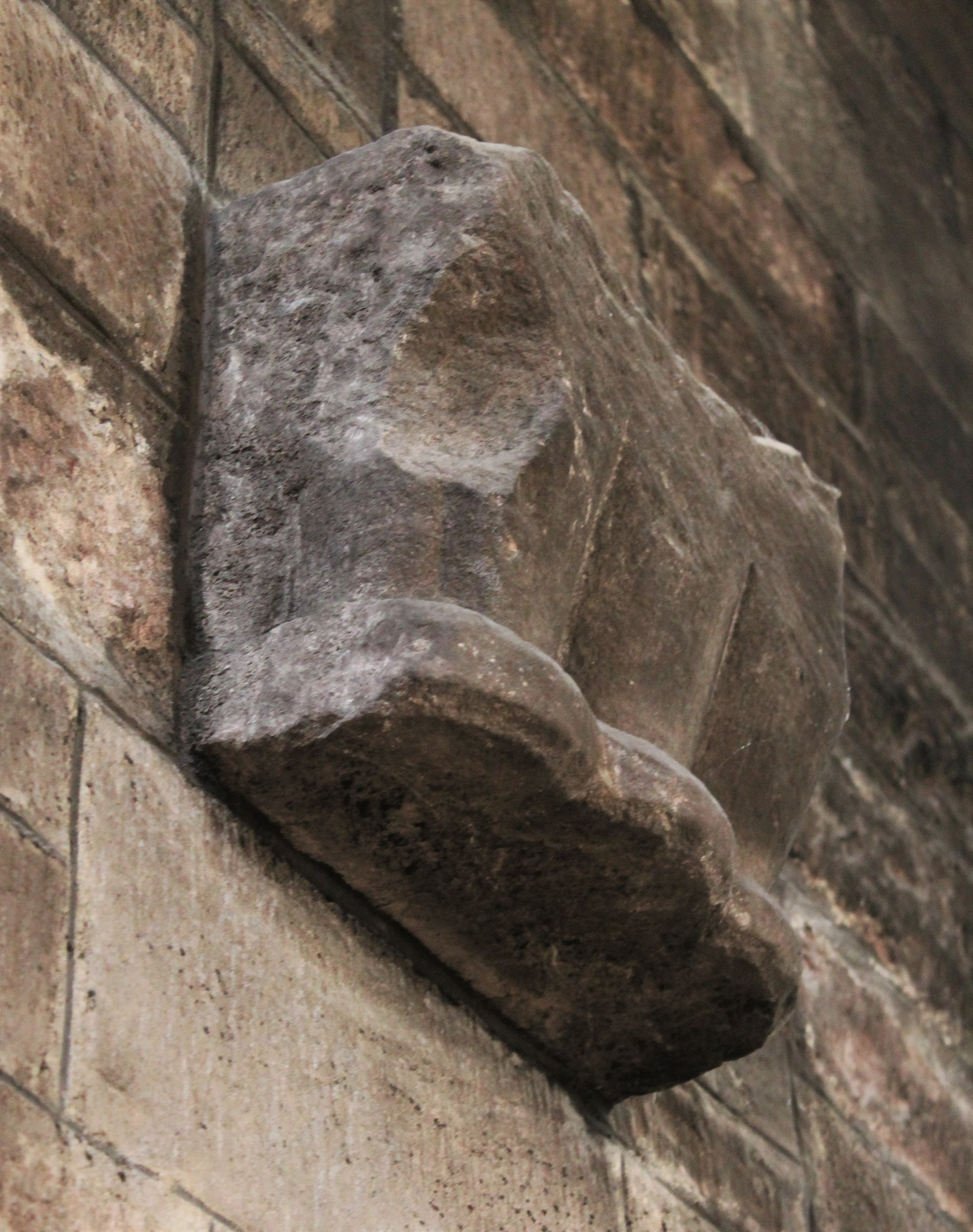
A capital from the 12th century church, reincorporated in the west wall of the St Eloi Aisle

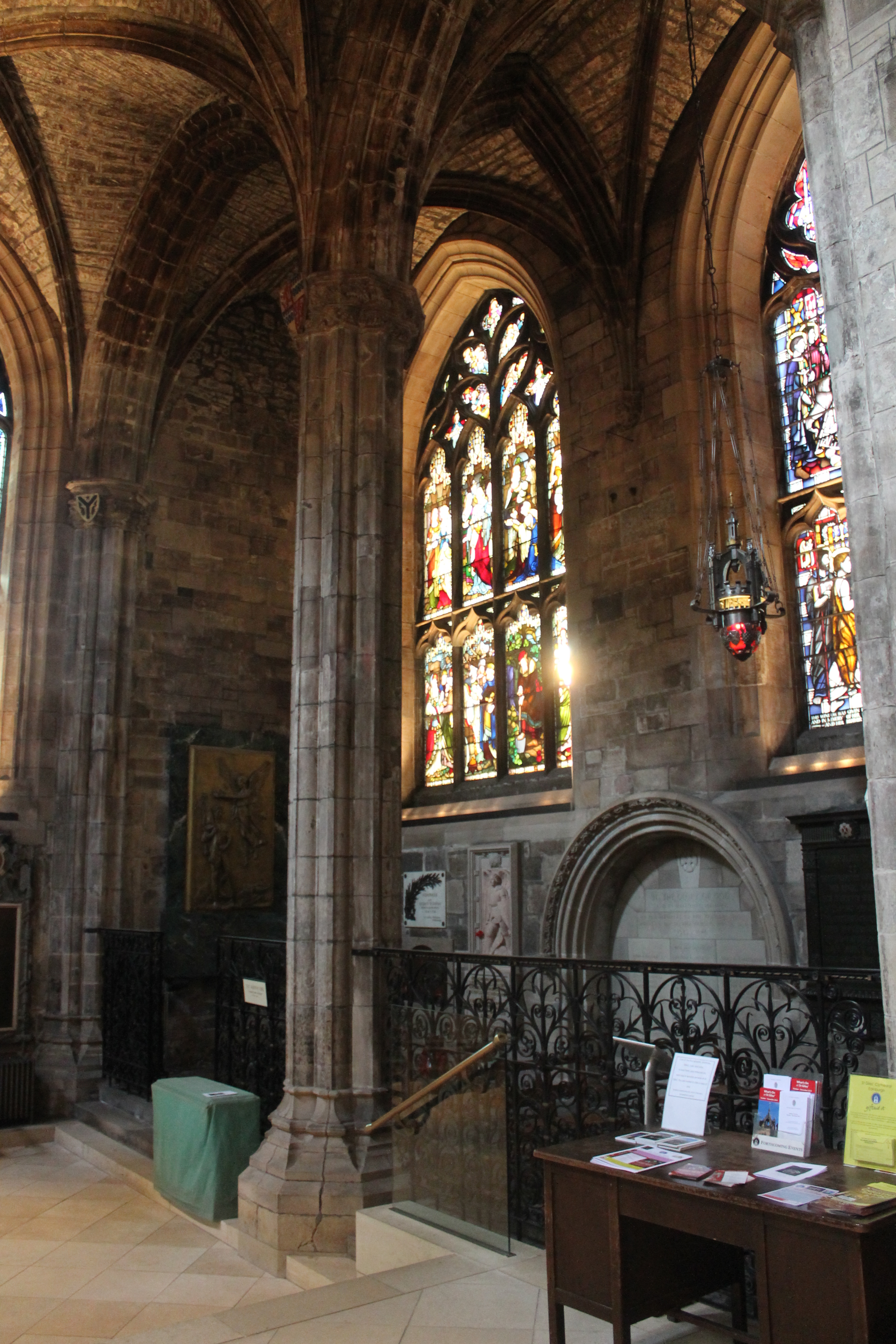
The Albany Aisle

=== South nave aisles ===
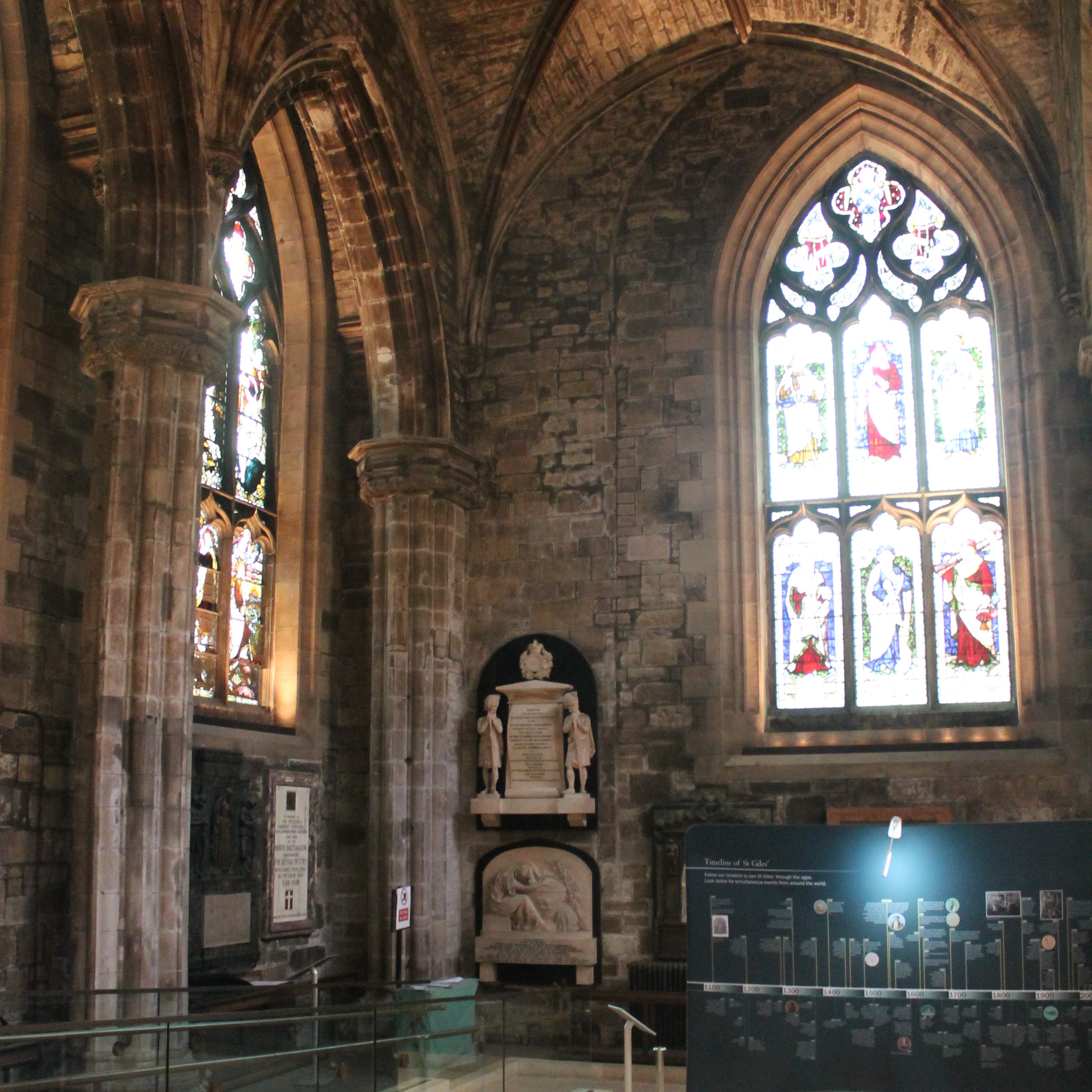
The effects of the Burn restoration can be seen at the west end of the inner south nave aisle: on the left is a gap between the pillars and the screen wall that was erected after the demolition of two bays; on the right, the outline of the original window is visible.

The inner and outer south nave aisles were likely begun in the later 15th century around the time of the Preston Aisle, which they strongly resemble. They were likely completed by 1510, when altars of the Holy Trinity, Saint Apollonia, and Saint Thomas were added to the west end of the inner aisle. The current aisles replaced the original south nave aisle and the five chapels by John Primrose, John Skuyer, and John of Perth, named in a contract of 1387. The inner aisle retains its original quadripartite vault; however, the plaster tierceron vault of the outer aisle (known as the Moray Aisle) dates to William Burn's restoration. During the Burn restoration, the two westernmost bays of the outer aisle were removed. There remains a prominent gap between the pillars of the missing bays and the 19th century wall. At the west end of the outer aisle, Burn added a new wall with a door and oriel window. Burn also replaced the window of the inner aisle with a smaller window, centred north of the original in order to accommodate a double niche on the exterior wall. The outline of the original window is still visible in the interior wall.

In 1513, Alexander Lauder of Blyth commissioned an aisle of two bays at the eastern end of the outer south nave aisle: the Holy Blood Aisle is the easternmost and only surviving bay of this aisle. It is named for the Confraternity of the Holy Blood, to whom it was granted upon completion in 1518. The western bay of the Aisle and the pillar separating the two bays were removed during the Burn restoration and the remainder was converted to a heating chamber. The Aisle was restored to ecclesiastical use under William Hay. An elaborate late Gothic tomb recess occupies the south wall of the aisle.

=== Crossing and transepts ===
The piers of the crossing date to the original building campaign of the 14th century and may be the oldest part of the present church. The piers were likely raised around 1400, at which time the present vault and bell hole were created. The first stages of both transepts were likely completed by 1395, in which year the St John's Aisle was added to the north of the north transept.

Initially, the north transept extended no further than the north wall of the aisles and possessed a tunnel-vaulted ceiling at the same height as those in the crossing and aisles. The arches between the transept and north aisles of the choir and nave appear to be 14th century. The St John's Chapel, extending north of the line of the aisles, was added in 1395; in its western end was a turnpike stair, which, at the Burn restoration, was re-set in the thick wall between the St Eloi Aisle and the north transept. The remains of St John's Chapel are visible in the east wall of the north transept: these include fragments of vaulting and a medieval window, which faces into the Chambers Aisle. The bottom half of this window's tracery, as far as its embattled transom, is original; curvilinear tracery was added to the upper half by MacGibbon and Ross in 1889–91. At the Burn restoration, the north transept was heightened and a clerestory and plaster vaulted ceiling inserted. A screen of 1881–83 by William Hay crosses the transept in line with the original north wall, creating a vestibule for the north door. The screen contains sculptures of the patron saints of the Incorporated Trades of Edinburgh by John Rhind as well as the arms of William Chambers. The ceiling and open screens within the vestibule were designed by Esmé Gordon and added in 1940. A fragment of medieval blind tracery is visible at the western end of this screen.

Initially, the south transept only extended to the line of the south aisles; it was extended in stages as the Preston, Chepman, and Holy Blood Aisles were added. The original barrel vault remains as far as an awkwardly inserted transverse arch supported on heavy corbels between the inner transept arches: this arch was likely inserted after the creation of the Preston Aisle, when the inner transept arches were expanded accordingly. The transverse arch carries an extension to the lower part of the tower, including a 15th-century traceried window. The south transept was heightened and a clerestory and plaster vaulted ceiling were inserted during the Burn restoration.

Crossing and transepts

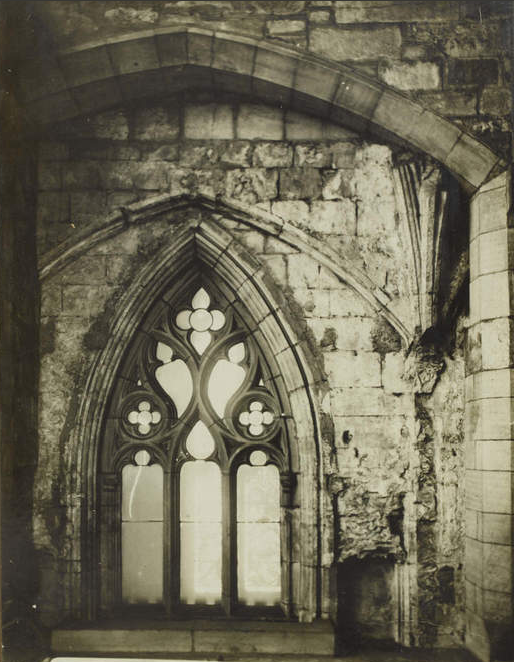
The window and remains of the vault of St John's Chapel in north transept

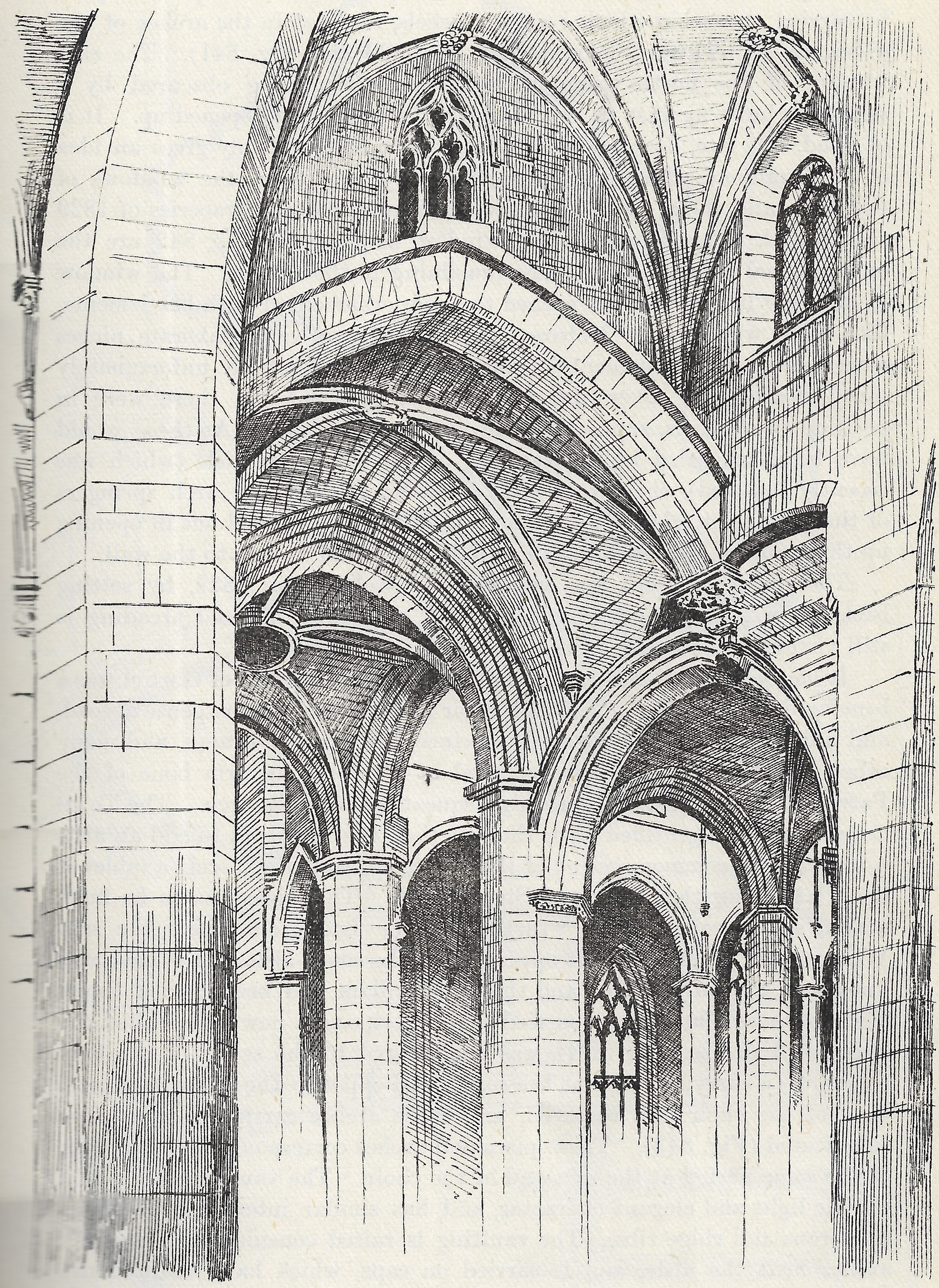
Drawing of the south transept, showing the partial barrel vault and transverse arch

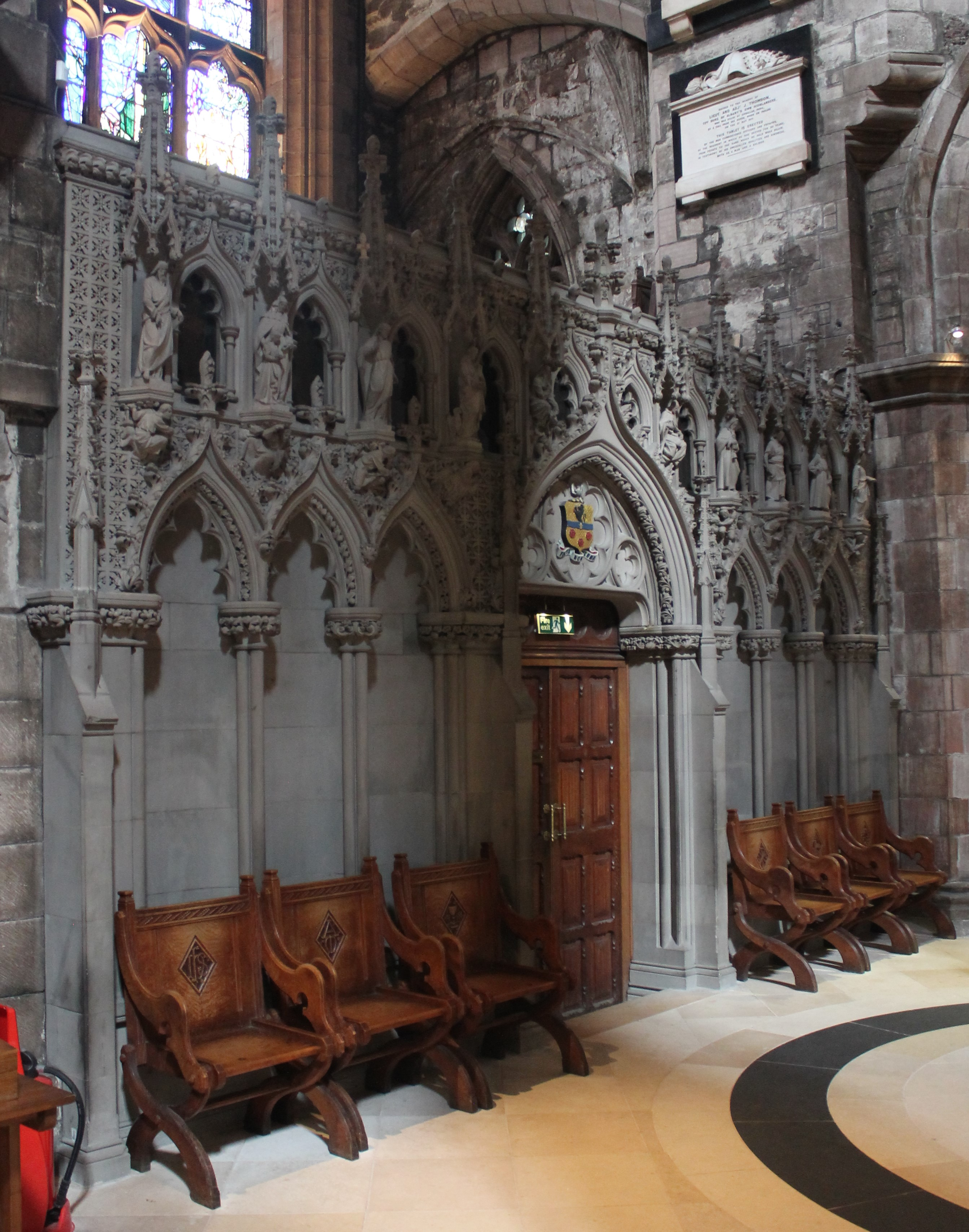
The north transept screen, designed by William Hay and carved by John Rhind

=== Choir ===
The Buildings of Scotland series calls the choir the "finest piece of late medieval parish church architecture in Scotland". The choir dates to two periods of building: one in the 14th century and one in the 15th. The archaeological excavations indicate the choir was extended to almost its current size in a single phase before the mid-15th-century work.

The choir was initially built as a hall church: as such, it was unique in Scotland. The western three bays of the choir date to this initial period of construction. The arcades of these bays are supported by simple, octagonal pillars. In the middle of the 15th century, two bays were added to the east end of the choir and the central section was raised to create a clerestory under a tierceron-vaulted ceiling in stone. The springers of the original vault are still visible above some of the capitals of the choir pillars and the outline of the original roof is visible above the eastern arch of the crossing. A grotesque at the intersection of the central rib of the ceiling and the east wall of the tower may be a fragment of the 12th century church. The two pillars and two demi-pillars constructed during this expansion in the easternmost bays of the choir are similar in type to those in the Albany Aisle.

Of the two pillars added during this extension, the northern one is known as the "King's Pillar" as its capital bears the arms of James III on its east face; James II on its west face; Mary of Guelders on its north face; and France on its south face. These arms date the work between the birth of James II in 1453 and the death of Mary of Guelders in 1463; the incomplete tressure in the arms of James II may indicate he was dead when the work commenced, dating it to after 1460. The southern pillar is known as the "Town's Pillar". Its capital bears the arms of William Preston of Gorton on its east face; James Kennedy, Bishop of St Andrews on its west face; Nicholas Otterbourne, Vicar of Edinburgh on its north face; and Edinburgh on its south face. The south respond bears the arms of Thomas Cranstoun, Chief Magistrate of Edinburgh; the north respond bears the arms of Alexander Napier of Merchiston, Provost of Edinburgh. Archaeological excavations in the 1980s found evidence these works and the creation of the Preston Aisle may have been partially spurred by a structural failure of parts of the church due to poor foundations and the need for renovations.

Choir

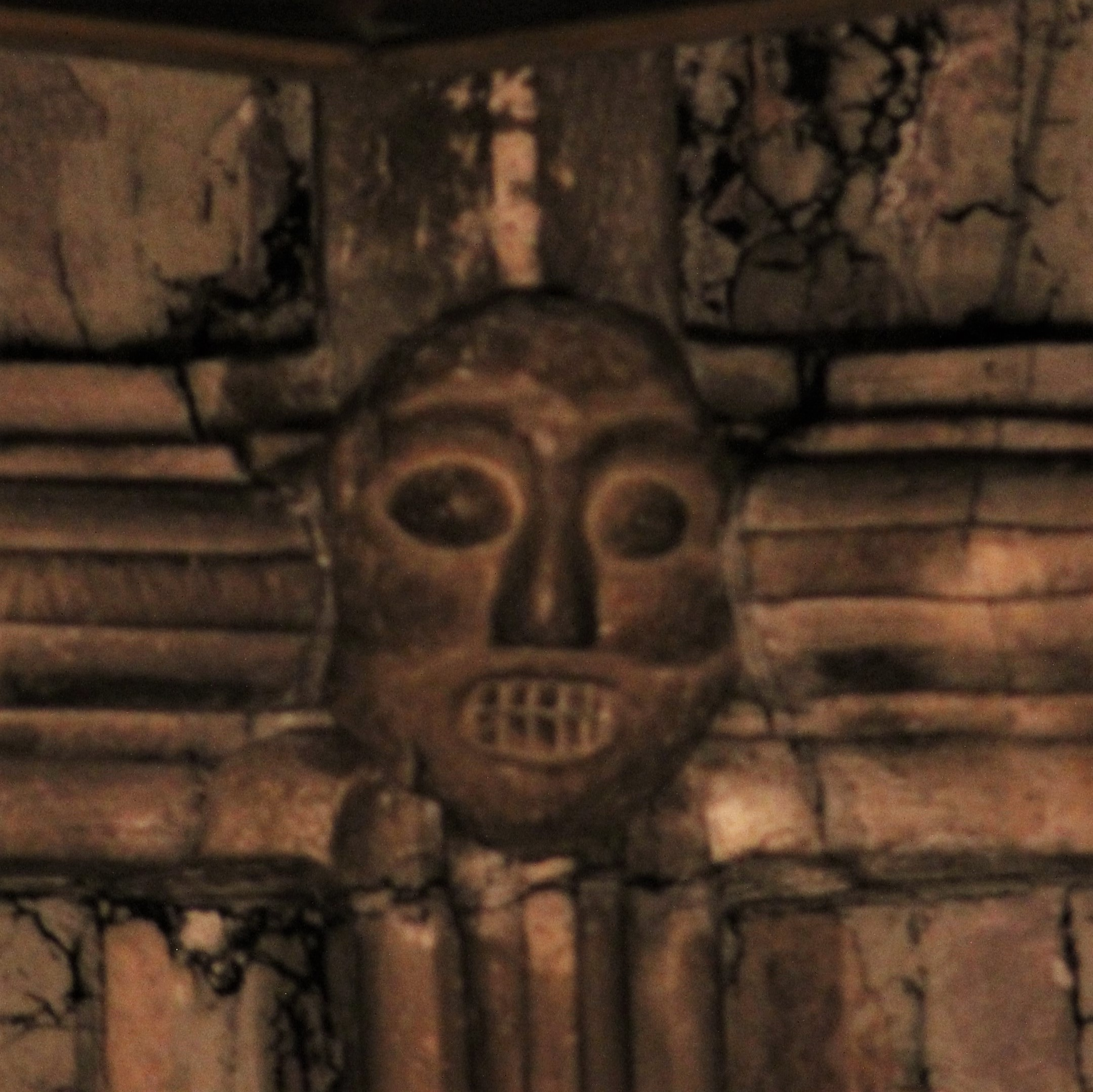
A 12th century grotesque, reincorporated in the 15th century vaulted ceiling

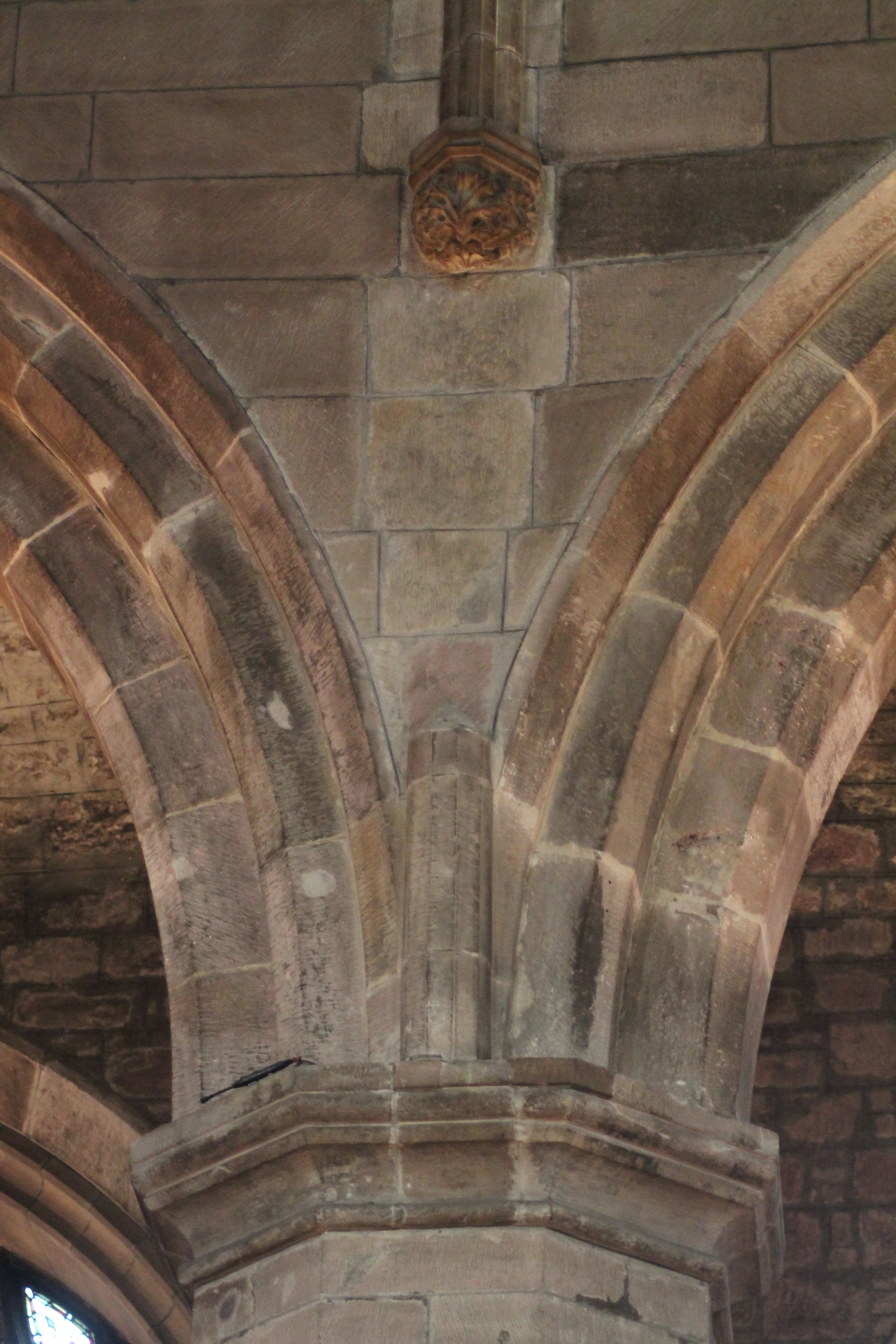
This fragment of a springer indicates that the original choir vault began at the capitals of the pillars.

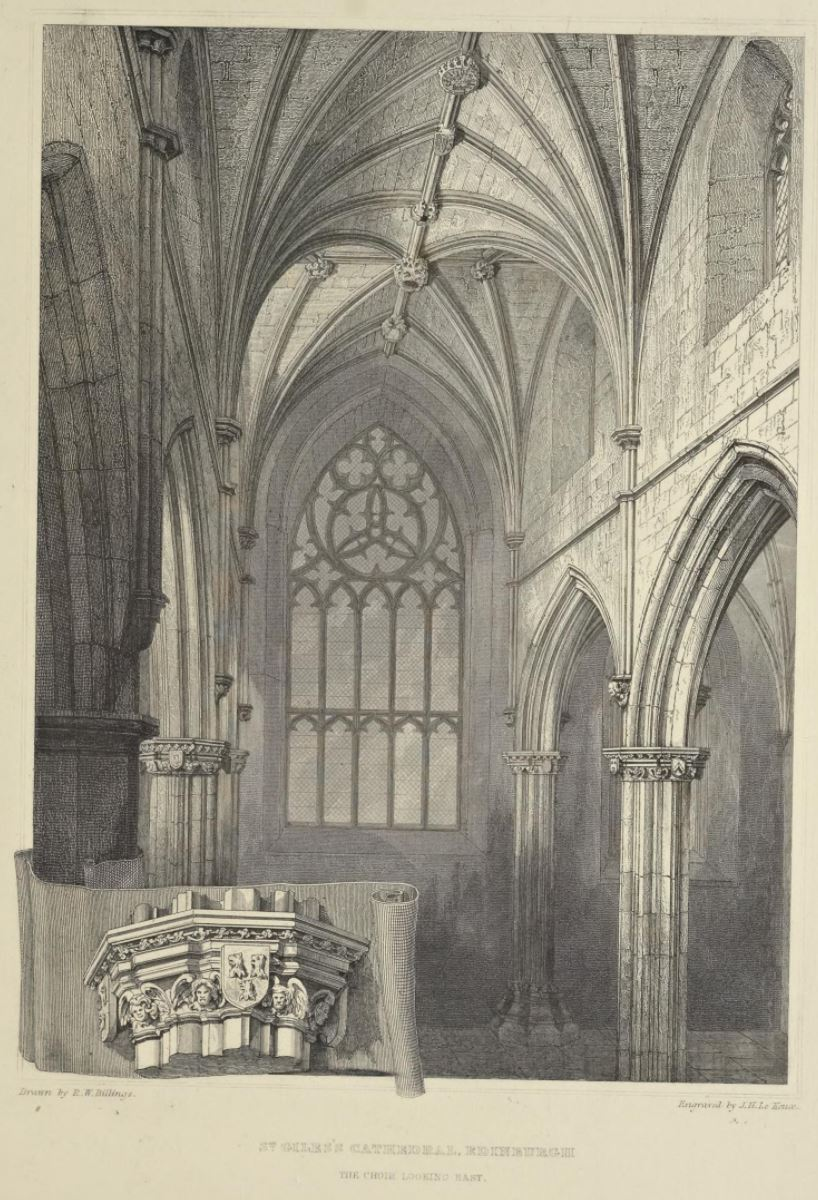
The east end of the choir, showing the vaulted ceiling, clerestory, and pillars added in the mid-15th century

=== Choir aisles ===
Of the two choir aisles, the north is only two thirds the width of the south aisle, which contained the Lady Chapel prior to the Reformation. Richard Fawcett suggests this indicates that both choir aisles were rebuilt after 1385. In both aisles, the curvature of the spandrels between the ribs gives the effect of a dome in each bay. The ribs appear to serve a structural purpose; however, the lack of any intersection between the lateral and longitudinal cells of each bay means that these vaults are effectively pointed barrel vaults. Having been added as part of the mid-15th century extension, the eastern bays of both aisles contain proper lateral cells. The north wall of the north choir aisle contains a 15th-century tomb recess; in this wall, a grotesque, which may date to the 12th century church, has been re-set. At the east end of the south aisle is a stone staircase added by Bernard Feilden and Simpson & Brown in 1981–82.

The Chambers Aisle stands north of the westernmost bay of the north choir aisle. This chapel was created in 1889–91 by MacGibbon and Ross as a memorial to William Chambers. This Aisle stands on the site of the medieval vestry, which, at the Reformation, was converted to the Town Clerk's office before being restored to its original use by William Burn. MacGibbon and Ross removed the wall between the vestry and the church and inserted a new arch and vaulted ceiling, both of which incorporate medieval masonry.

The Preston Aisle stands south of the western three bays of the south choir aisle. It is named for William Preston of Gorton, who donated Saint Giles' arm-bone to the church; Preston's arms recur in the bosses and capitals of the chapel. The town council began the Aisle's construction in 1455, undertaking to complete it within seven years; however, the presence in the Aisle of a boss bearing the arms of Lord Hailes, Provost of Edinburgh in the 1480s, suggests construction took significantly longer. The Aisle's tierceron vault and pillars are similar to those in the 15th century extension of the choir. The pillars and capitals also bear a strong resemblance to those between the inner and outer south nave aisles.

The Chepman Aisle extends south of the westernmost bay of the Preston Aisle. The Aisle was founded by Walter Chepman; permission for construction was granted in 1507 and consecration took place in 1513. The ceiling of the Aisle is a pointed barrel vault whose central boss depicts an angel bearing Chepman's arms impaled with those of his first wife, Mariota Kerkettill. The Aisle was divided into three storeys during the Burn restoration then restored in 1888 under the direction of Robert Rowand Anderson.

Choir aisles

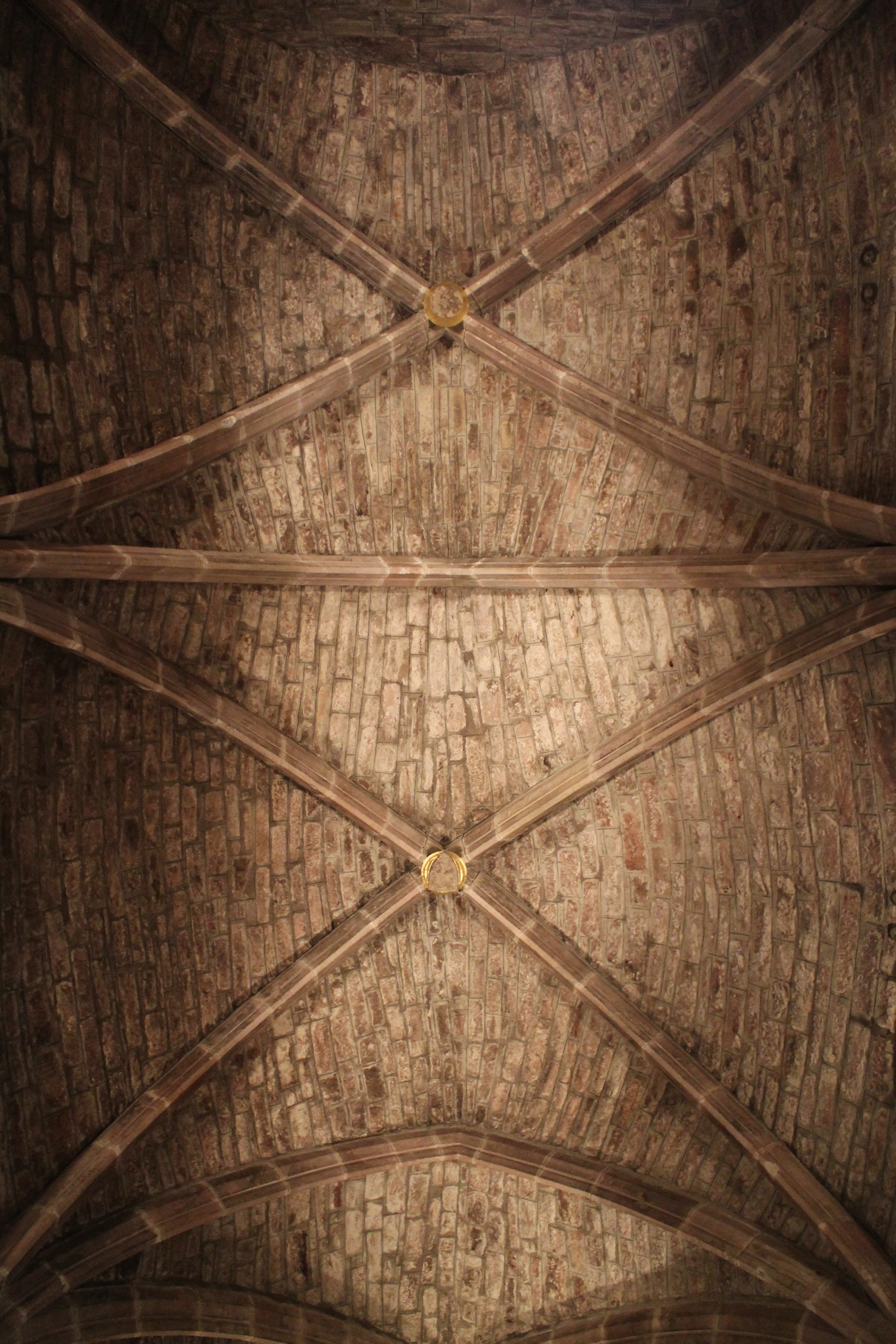
The curved barrel vault of the south choir aisle

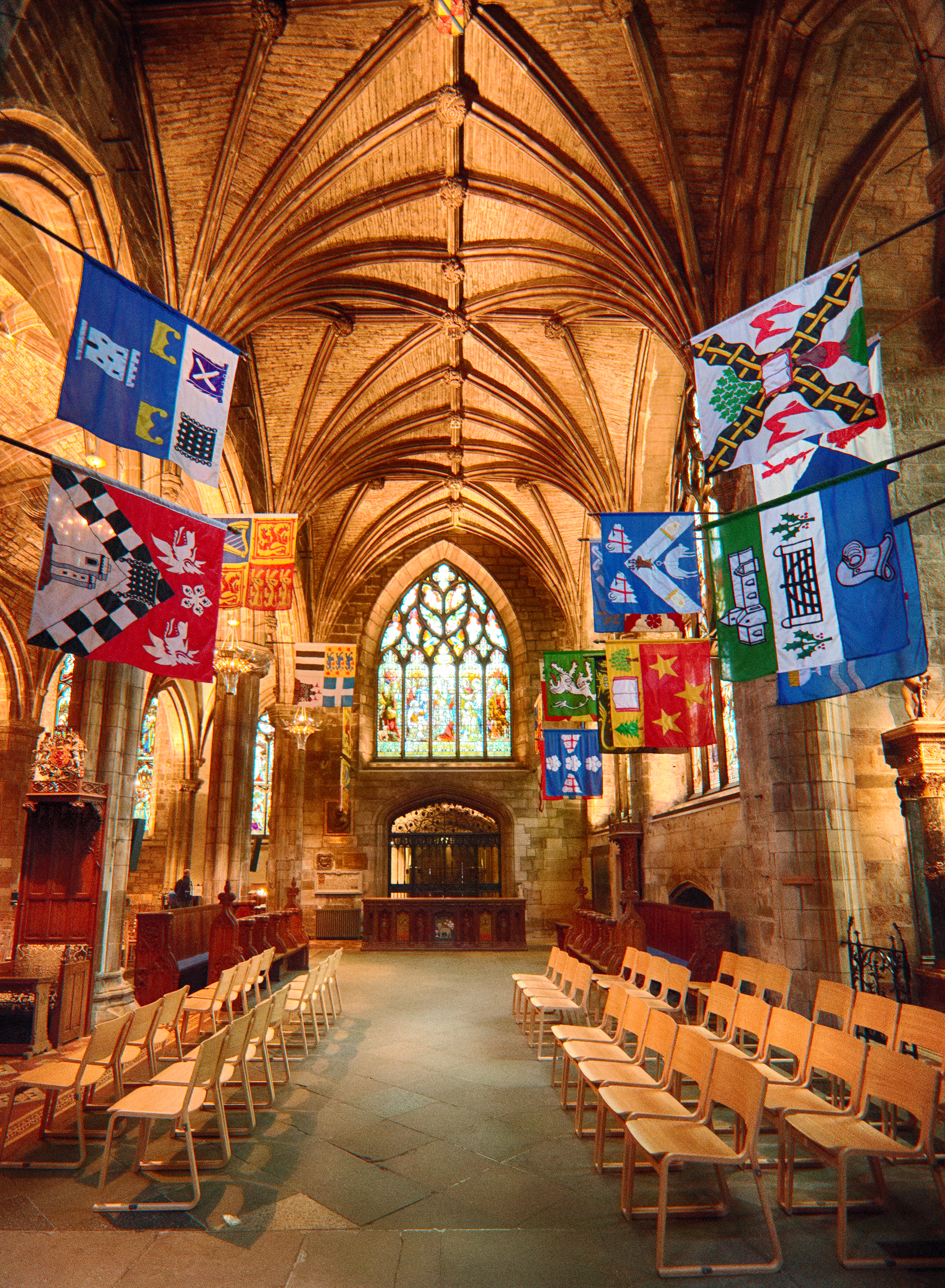
The Preston Aisle

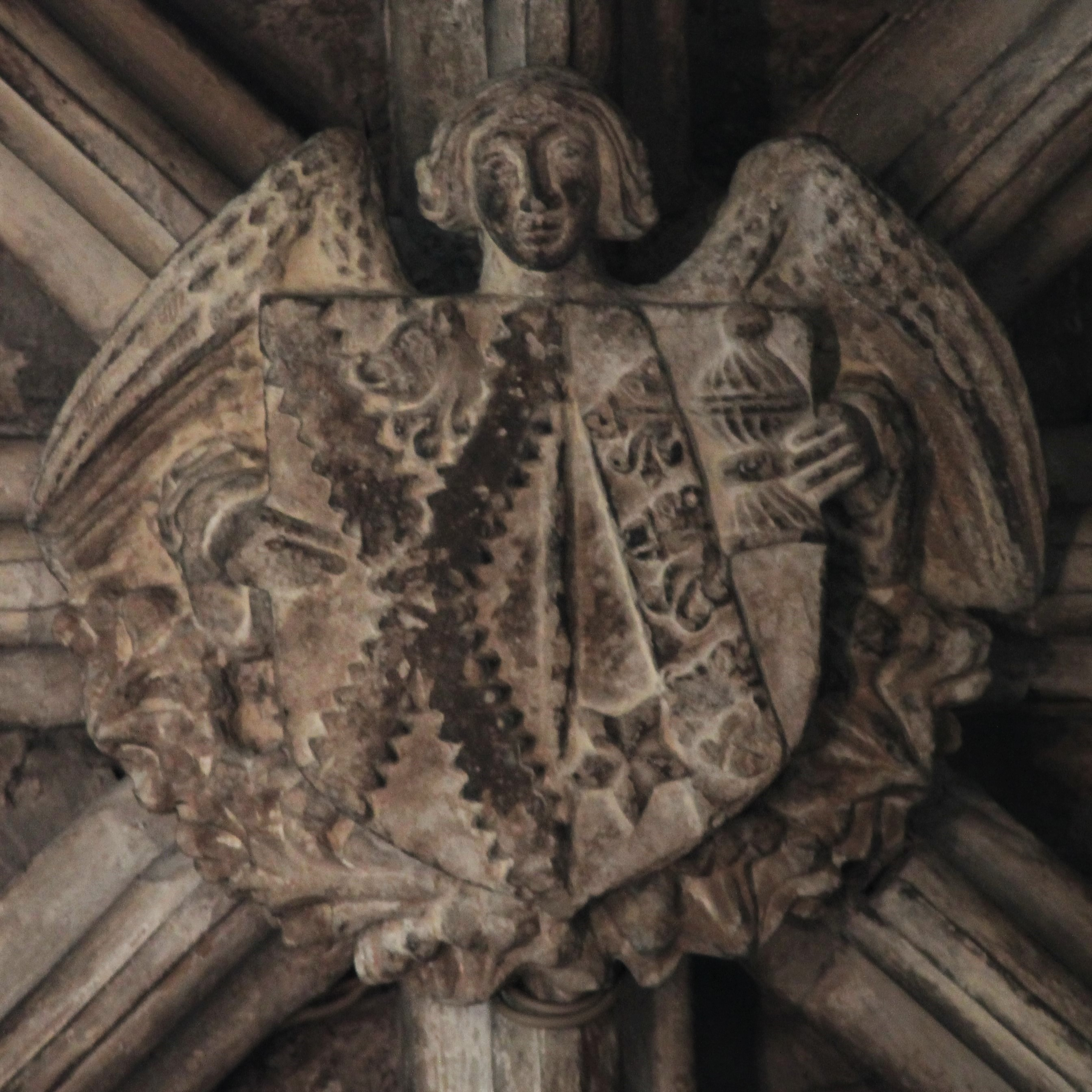
A boss in the Chepman Aisle, showing the arms of the Aisle's founder, Walter Chepman, impaled with those of his first wife, Mariota Kerkettill

== Stained glass ==
St Giles' is glazed with 19th and 20th century stained glass by a diverse array of artists and manufacturers. Between 2001 and 2005, the church's stained glass was restored by the Stained Glass Design Partnership of Kilmaurs.

Fragments of the medieval stained glass were discovered in the 1980s: none was obviously pictorial and some may have been grisaille. A pre-Reformation window depicting an elephant and the emblem of the Incorporation of Hammermen survived in the St Eloi Aisle until the 19th century. References to the removal of the stained glass windows after the Reformation are unclear. A scheme of coloured glass was considered as early as 1830: three decades before the first new coloured glass in a Church of Scotland building was installed at Greyfriars Kirk in 1857; however, the plan was rejected by the town council.

=== Victorian windows ===
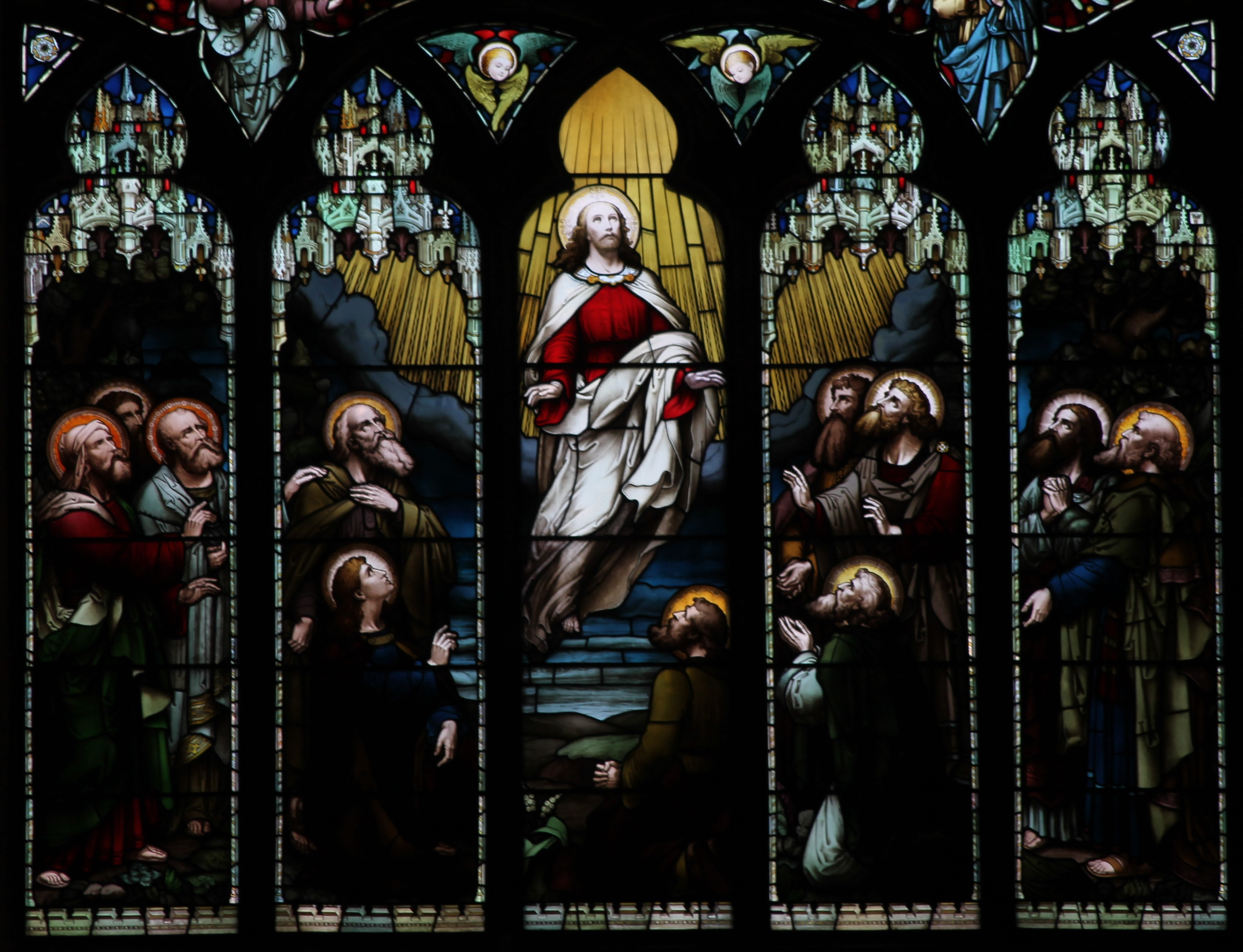
Jesus ascends into heaven in the east window by Ballantine & Son (1877). Most windows in St Giles' are by the Ballantine firm.

By the 1860s, attitudes to stained glass had liberalised within Scottish Presbyterianism and the insertion of new windows was a key component of William Chambers' plan to restore St Giles'. The firm of James Ballantine was commissioned to produce a sequence depicting the life of Christ, as suggested by the artists Robert Herdman and Joseph Noel Paton. This sequence commences with a window of 1874 in the north choir aisle and climaxes in the great east window of 1877, depicting the Crucifixion and Ascension.

Other windows by Ballantine & Son are the Prodigal Son window in the south wall of the south nave aisle; the west window of the Albany Aisle, depicting the parable of the Wise and Foolish Virgins and the parable of the talents (1876); and the west window of the Preston Aisle, depicting Saint Paul (1881). Ballantine & Son are also responsible for the window of the Holy Blood Aisle, depicting the assassination and funeral of the Regent Moray (1881): this is the only window of the church that depicts events from Scottish history. Andrew Ballantine produced the west window in the south wall of the inner south nave aisle (1886): this depicts scenes from the life of Moses. The subsequent generation of the Ballantine firm, Ballantine & Gardiner, produced windows depicting the first Pentecost (1895) and Saint Peter (1895–1900) in the Preston Aisle; David and Jonathan in the east window of the south side of the outer south nave aisle (1900–01); Joseph in the east window of the south wall of the inner south nave aisle (1898); and, in the windows of the Chambers Aisle, Solomon's construction of the Temple (1892) and scenes from the life of John the Baptist (1894).

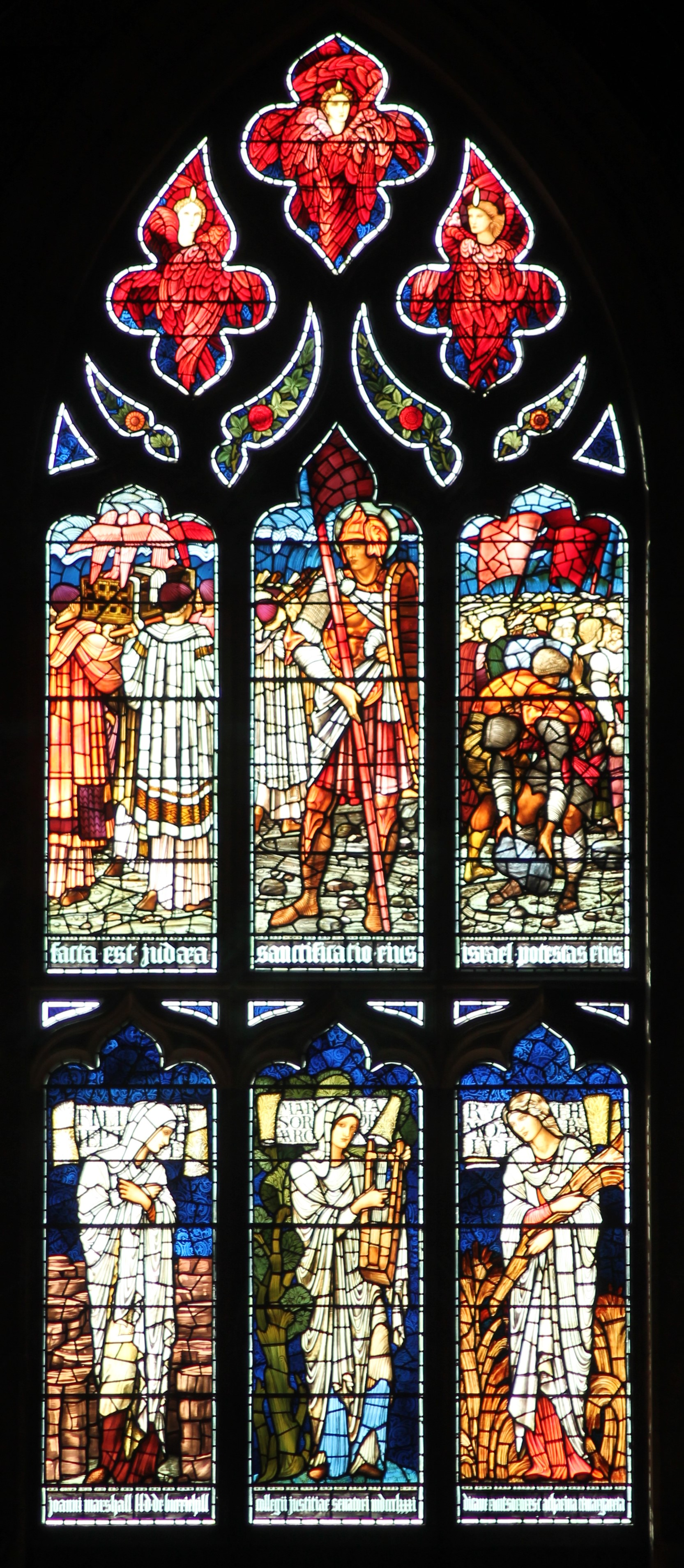
The Joshua window by Edward Burne-Jones (1886)

Multiple generations of the Ballantine firm executed heraldic windows in the oriel window of the outer south nave aisle (1883) and in the clerestory of the choir (1877–92): the latter series depicts the arms of the Incorporated Trades of Edinburgh. David Small is responsible for the easternmost window of the north side of the clerestory (1879). Ballantine & Son also produced the window of the Chepman Aisle, showing the arms of notable 17th century Royalists (1888); in the St Eloi Aisle, the Glass Stainers' Company produced a companion window, showing the arms of notable Covenanters (1895).

Daniel Cottier designed the east window of the north side of the north nave aisle, depicting the Christian virtues (1890). Cottier also designed the great west window, now-replaced, depicting the Prophets (1886). Edward Burne-Jones designed the window in the west wall of the north nave aisle (1886). This was produced by Morris & Co. and shows Joshua and the Israelites in the upper section with Jephthah's daughter, Miriam, and Ruth in the lower section. Other stained glass artists of the Victorian era represented in St Giles' are Burlison & Grylls, who executed the Patriarchs window in the west wall of the inner south nave aisle and Charles Eamer Kempe, who created the west window of the south side of the outer south nave aisle: this depicts biblical writers.

=== 20th century windows ===
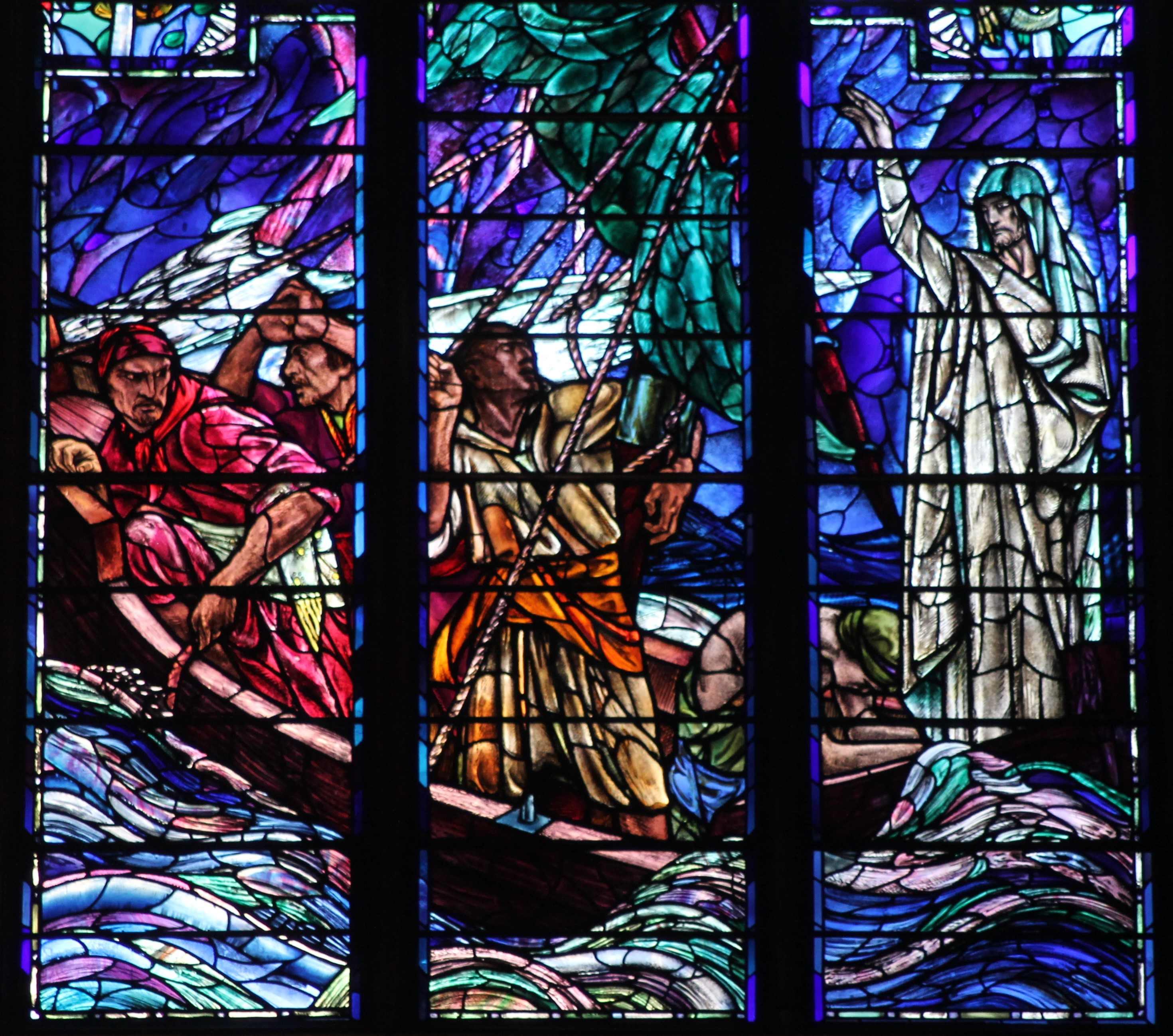
Detail of the north transept window by Douglas Strachan (1922)

Oscar Paterson is responsible for the west window of the north side of the north nave aisle (1906): this shows saints associated with St Giles'. Karl Parsons designed the west window of the south side of the south choir aisle (1913): this depicts saints associated with Scotland. Douglas Strachan is responsible for the windows of the choir clerestory that depict saints (1932–35) and for the north transept window (1922): this shows Christ walking on water and stilling the Sea of Galilee, alongside golden angels subduing demons that represent the four winds of the earth.

Windows of the later 20th century include a window in the north transept clerestory by William Wilson, depicting Saint Andrew (1954), and the east window of the Albany Aisle, on the theme of John the Divine, designed by Francis Spear and painted by Arthur Pearce (1957). The most significant recent window is the great west window, a memorial to Robert Burns (1985). This was designed by Leifur Breiðfjörð to replace the Cottier window of 1886, the glass of which had failed. A scheme of coloured glass, designed by Christian Shaw, was installed in the south transept behind the organ in 1991.

== Memorials ==
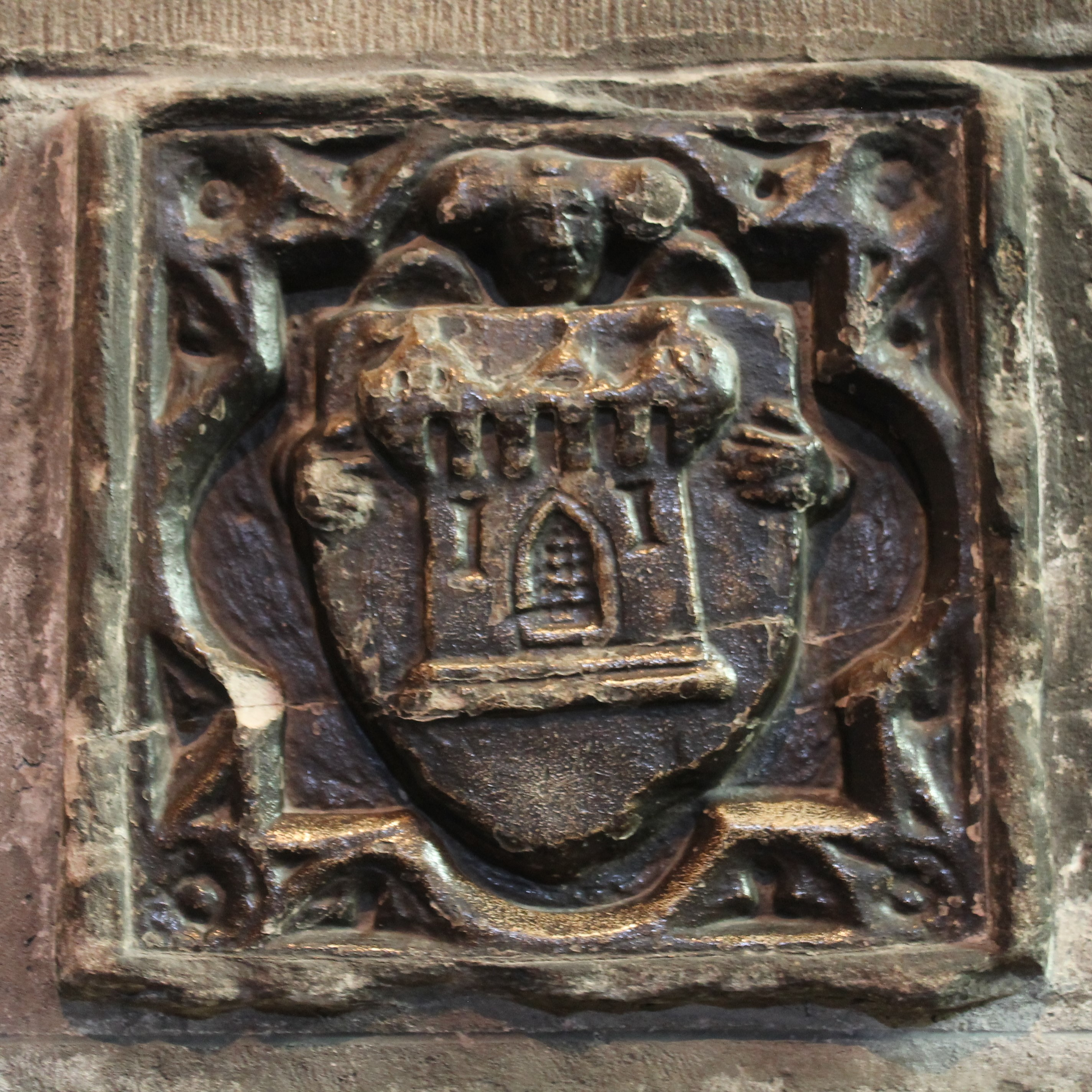
The arms of Edinburgh from a medieval plaque in the Preston Aisle

There are over a hundred memorials in St. Giles'; most date from the 19th century onwards.

In the medieval period, the floor of St Giles' was paved with memorial stones and brasses; these were gradually cleared after the Reformation. At the Burn restoration of 1829–1833, most post-Reformation memorials were destroyed; fragments were removed to Culter Mains and Swanston.

The installation of memorials to notable Scots was an important component of William Chambers' plans to make St Giles' the "Westminster Abbey of Scotland". To this end, a management board was set up in 1880 to supervise the installation of new monuments; it continued in this function until 2000. All the memorials were conserved between 2008 and 2009.

=== Ancient memorials ===
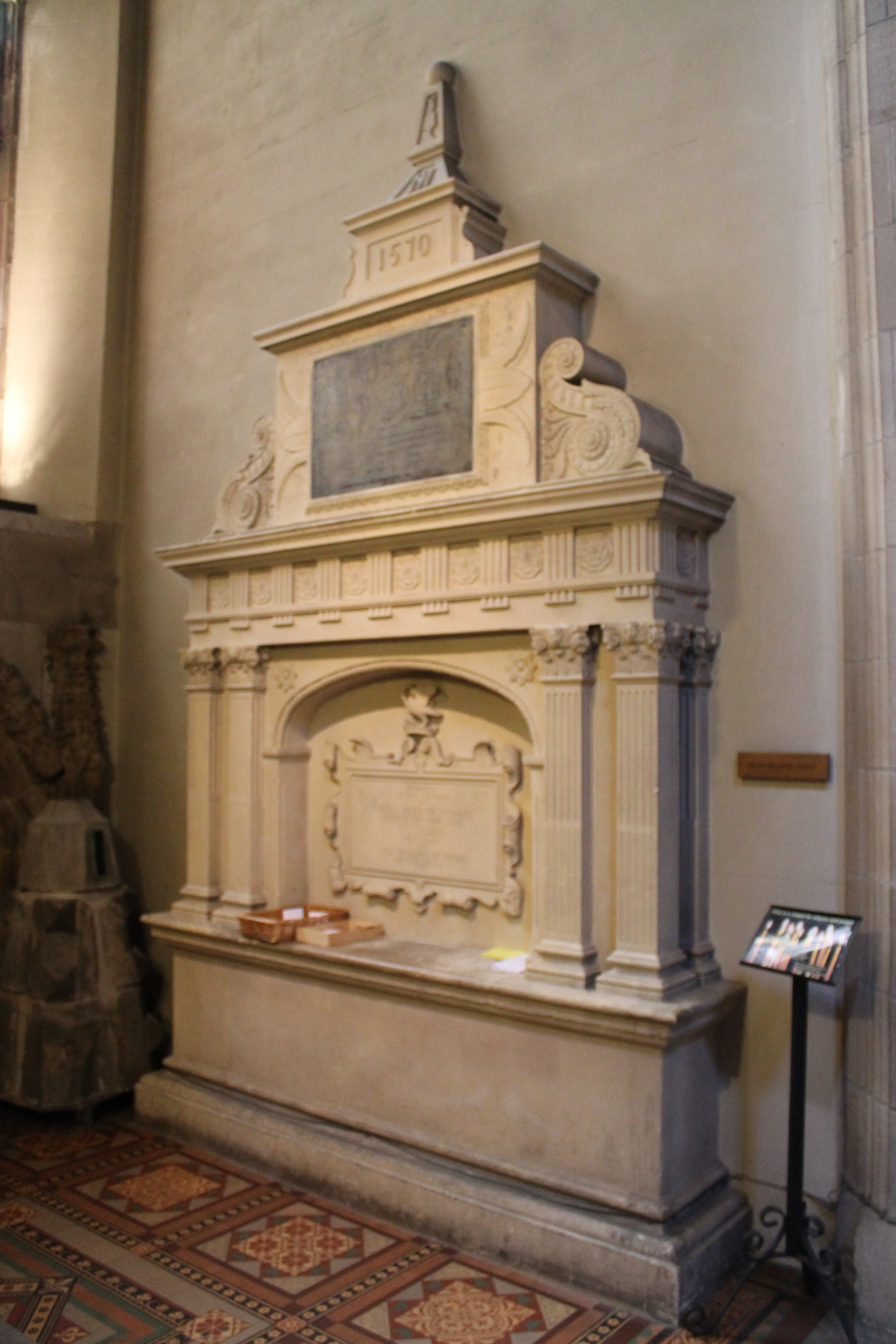
Regent Moray's monument

Medieval tomb recesses survive in the Preston Aisle, Holy Blood Aisle, Albany Aisle, and north choir aisle; alongside these, fragments of memorial stones have been re-incorporated into the east wall of the Preston Aisle: these include a memorial to "Johannes Touris de Innerleith" and a carving of the coat of arms of Edinburgh.

A memorial brass to the Regent Moray is situated on his monument in the Holy Blood Aisle. The plaque depicts female personifications of Justice and Religion flanking the Regent's arms and an inscription by George Buchanan. The plaque was inscribed by James Gray on the rear of a fragment of a late 15th century memorial brass: a fibreglass replica of this side of the brass is installed on the opposite wall. The plaque was originally set in a monument of 1570 by Murdoch Walker and John Ryotell: this was destroyed at the Burn restoration but the plaque was saved and reinstated in 1864, when John Stuart, 12th Earl of Moray commissioned David Cousin to design a replica of his ancestor's memorial.

A memorial tablet in the basement vestry commemorates John Stewart, 4th Earl of Atholl, who was buried in the Chepman Aisle in 1579. A plaque commemorating the Napiers of Merchiston is located on the north exterior wall of the choir. This was likely installed on the south side of the church by Archibald Napier, 1st Lord Napier in 1637; it was moved to its present location during the Burn restoration.

=== Victorian and Edwardian memorials ===
Most memorials installed between the Burn restoration of 1829–1833 and the Chambers restoration of 1872–83 are now located in the north transept: these include white marble tablets commemorating Major General Robert Henry Dick (died 1846); Patrick Robertson, Lord Robertson (died 1855); and Aglionby Ross Carson (1856). The largest of these memorials is a massive plaque surmounted by an urn designed by David Bryce to commemorate George Lorimer, Dean of Guild and hero of the 1865 Theatre Royal fire (1867).

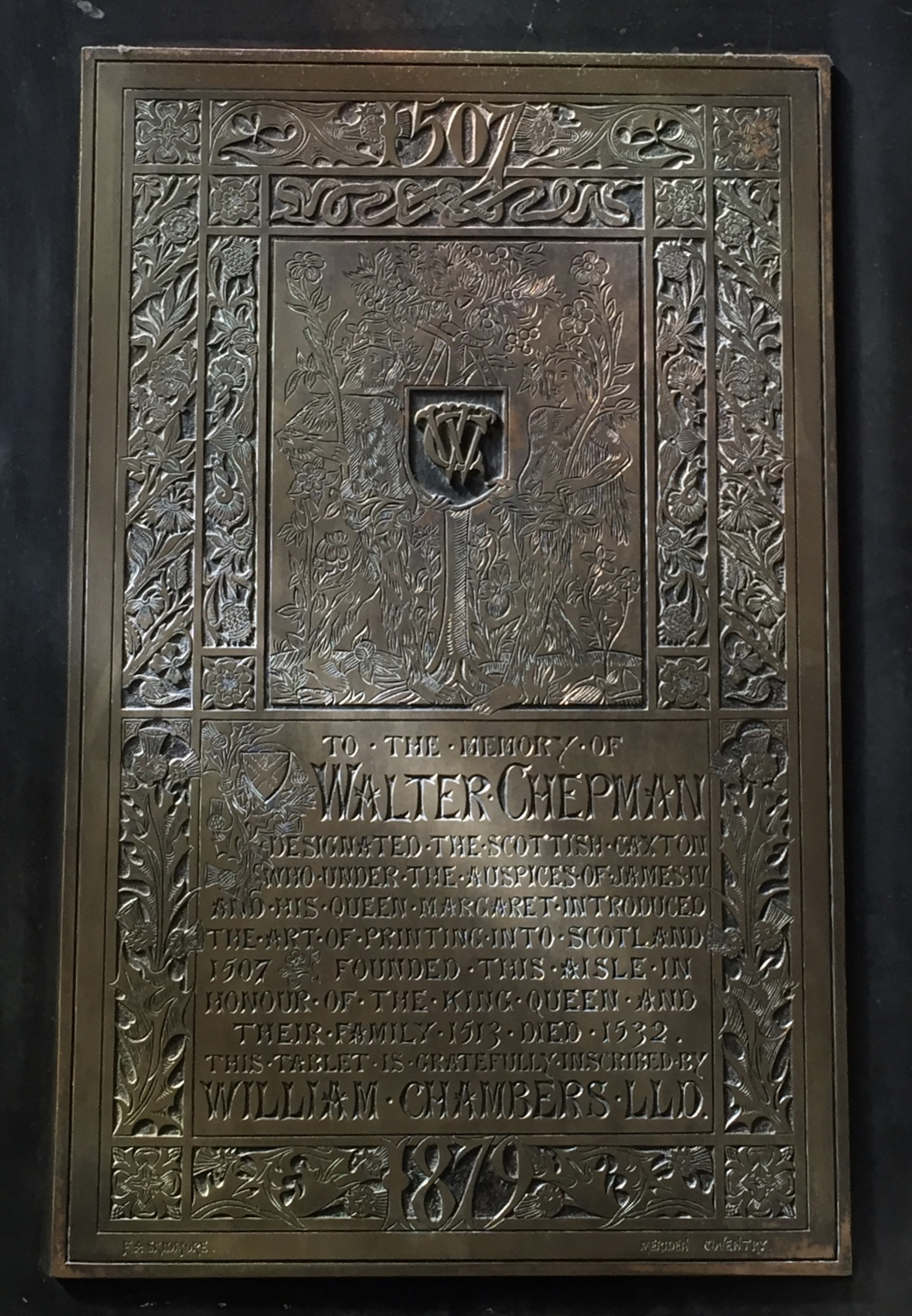
1879 memorial to Walter Chepman by Francis Skidmore

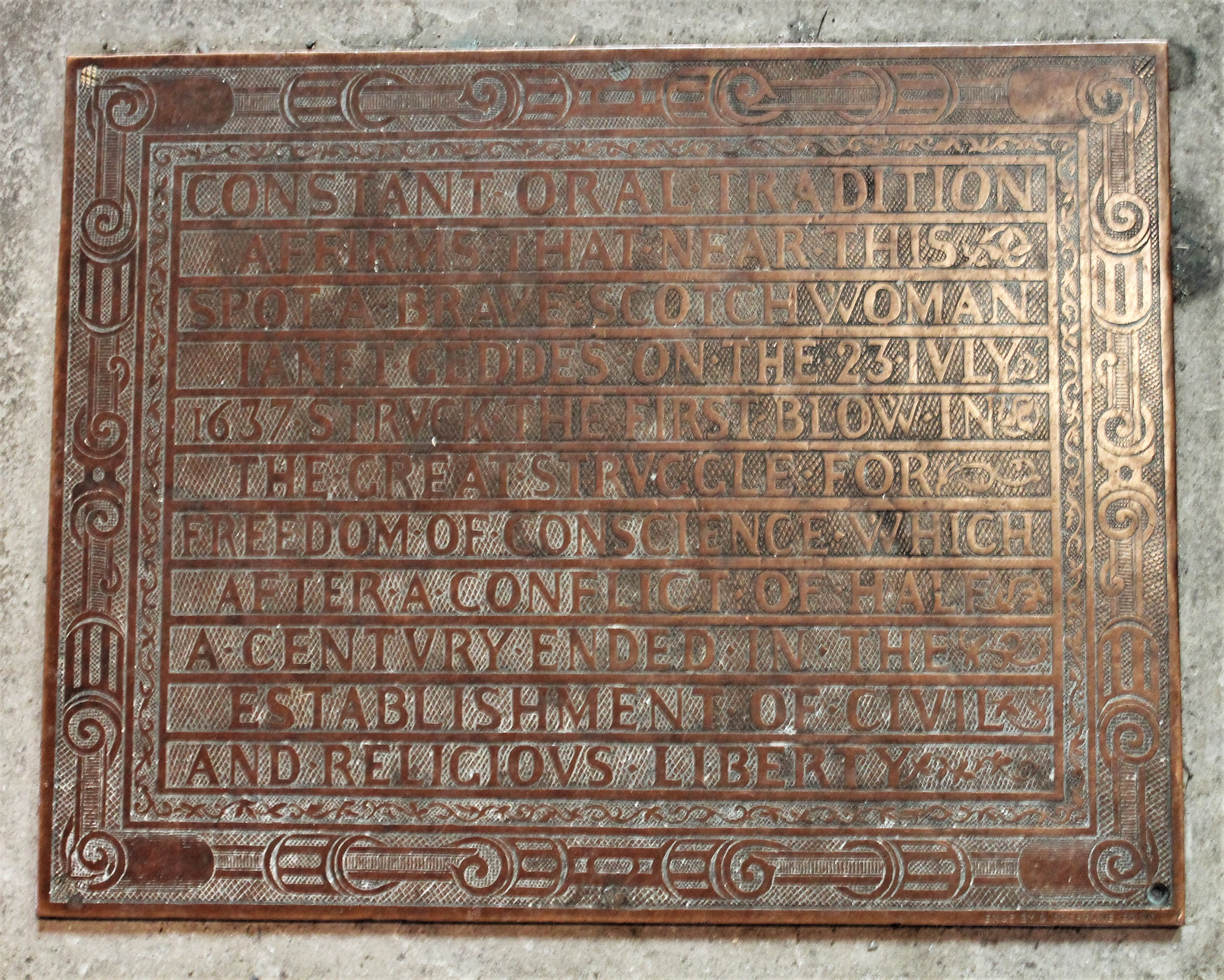
Memorial to Jenny Geddes (1885)

William Chambers, who funded the restoration of 1872–83, commissioned the memorial plaque to Walter Chepman in the Chepman Aisle (1879): this was designed by William Hay and produced by Francis Skidmore. Chambers himself is commemorated by a large plaque in a red marble frame (1894): located in the Chambers Aisle, this was designed by David MacGibbon with the bronze plaque produced by Hamilton and Inches. William Hay, the architect who oversaw the restoration (died 1888), is commemorated by a plaque in the north transept vestibule with a relief portrait by John Rhind.

The first memorial installed after the Chambers restoration was a brass plaque dedicated to Dean James Hannay, the cleric whose reading of Charles I's Scottish Prayer Book in 1637 sparked rioting (1882). In response, and John Stuart Blackie and Robert Halliday Gunning supported a monument to Jenny Geddes, who, according to tradition, threw a stool at Hannay. An 1885 plaque on the floor between south nave aisles now marks the putative spot of Geddes' action. Other historical figures commemorated by plaques of this period include Agnes Keith, Countess of Moray (1893); Robert Leighton (1883); Gavin Douglas (1883); Alexander Henderson (1883); William Carstares (1884); and John Craig (1883), and James Dalrymple, 1st Viscount Stair (1906).

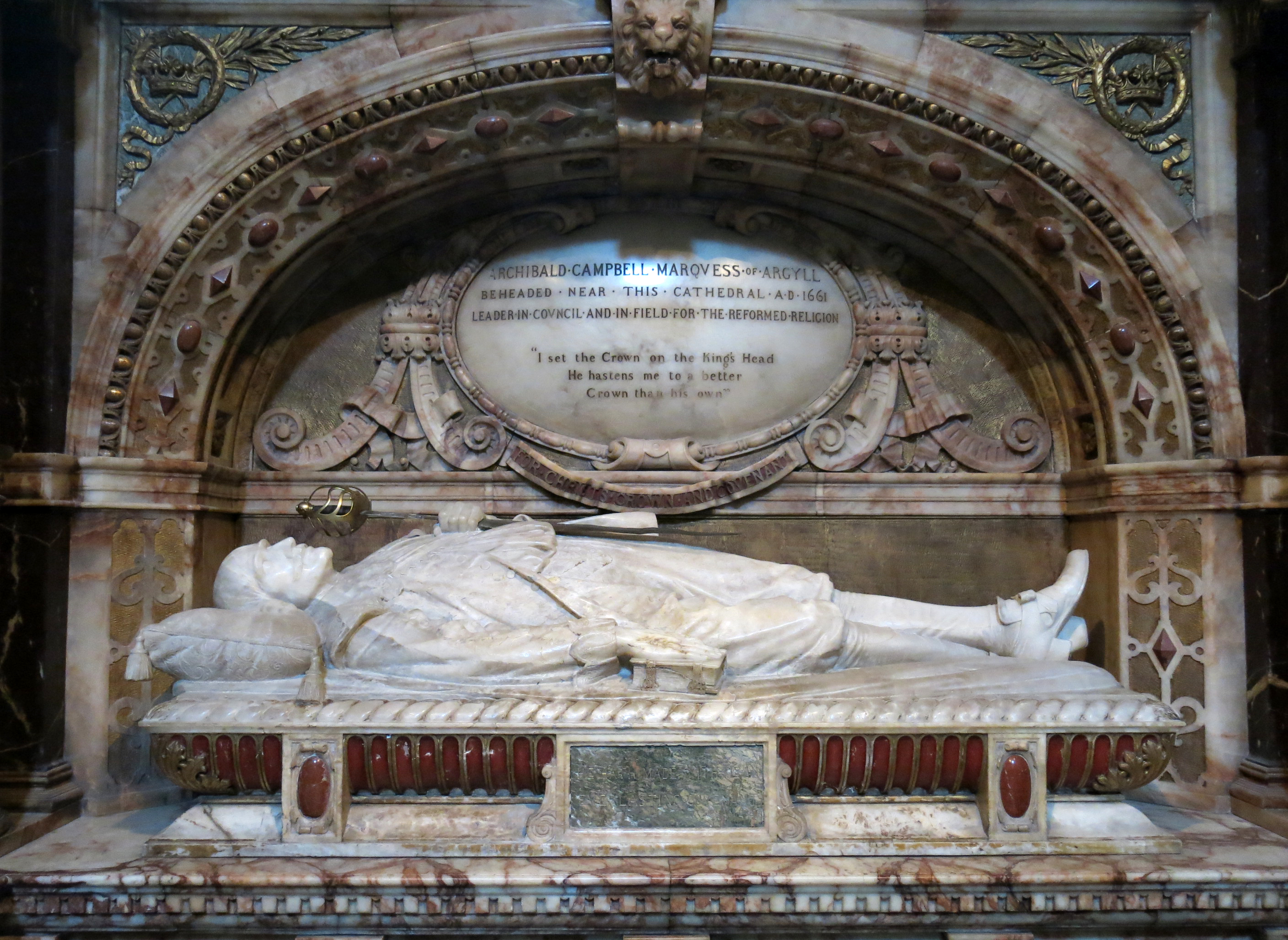
Detail of the memorial to Archibald Campbell, 1st Marquess of Argyll (1895)

The largest memorials of this period are the Jacobean-style monuments to James Graham, 1st Marquess of Montrose in the Chepman Aisle (1888) and to his rival, Archibald Campbell, 1st Marquess of Argyll, in the St Eloi Aisle (1895); both are executed in alabaster and marble and take the form of aedicules in which lie life-size effigies of their dedicatees. The Montrose monument was designed by Robert Rowand Anderson and carved by John and William Birnie Rhind. The Argyll monument, funded by Robert Halliday Gunning, was designed by Sydney Mitchell and carved by Charles McBride.

Other prominent memorials of this period include the Jacobean-style plaque on the south wall of the south choir aisle, commemorating John Inglis, Lord Glencorse and designed by Robert Rowand Anderson (1892); the memorial to Arthur Penrhyn Stanley (died 1881) in the Preston Aisle, including a relief portrait by Mary Grant; and the large bronze relief of Robert Louis Stevenson by Augustus Saint-Gaudens on the west wall of the Moray Aisle (1904). A life-size bronze statue of John Knox by James Pittendrigh MacGillivray (1906) stands in the north nave aisle. This initially stood in a Gothic niche in the east wall of the Albany Aisle; the niche was removed in 1951 and between 1965 and 1983, the statue stood outside the church, in Parliament Square.

=== 20th and 21st century memorials ===
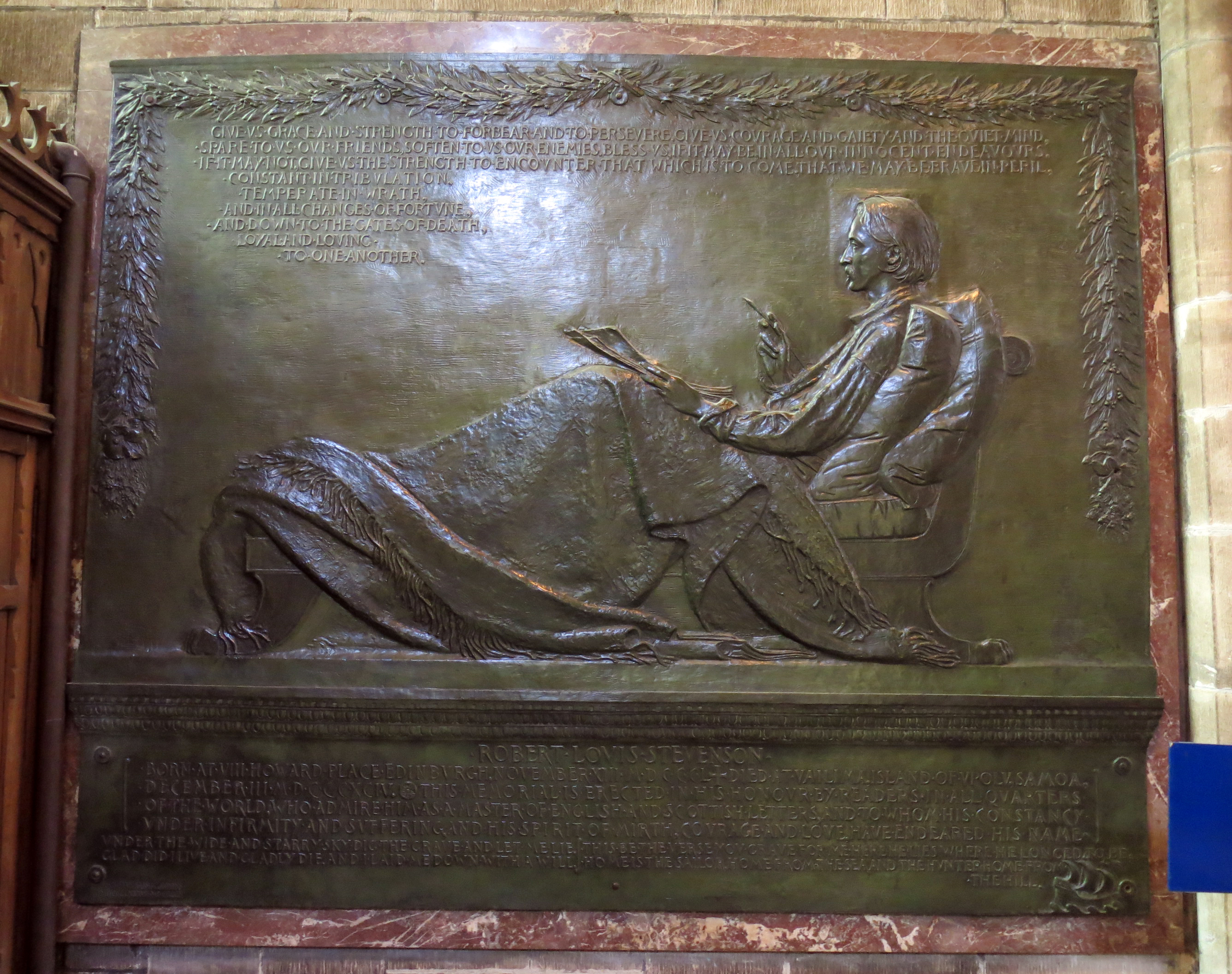
Augustus Saint-Gaudens' memorial to Robert Louis Stevenson (1906)

In the north choir aisle, the bronze plaque commemorating Sophia Jex-Blake (died 1912) and the stone plaque to James Nicoll Ogilvie (1928) were designed by Robert Lorimer. Lorimer himself is commemorated by a large stone plaque in the Preston Aisle (1932): this was designed by Alexander Paterson. A number of plaques in the "Writers' Corner" in the Moray Aisle incorporate relief portraits of their dedicatees: these include memorials to Robert Fergusson (1927) and Margaret Oliphant (1908), sculpted by James Pittendrigh Macgillivray; John Brown (1924), sculpted by Pilkington Jackson; and John Stuart Blackie (died 1895) and Thomas Chalmers (died 1847), designed by Robert Lorimer. Further relief portrait plaques commemorate Robert Inches (1922) in the former session house and William Smith (1929) in the Chambers Aisle; the former was sculpted by Henry Snell Gamley. Pilkington Jackson executed a pair of bronze relief portraits in pedimented Hopton Wood Stone frames to commemorate Cameron Lees (1931) and Wallace Williamson (1936): these flank the entrance to the Thistle Chapel in the south choir aisle.

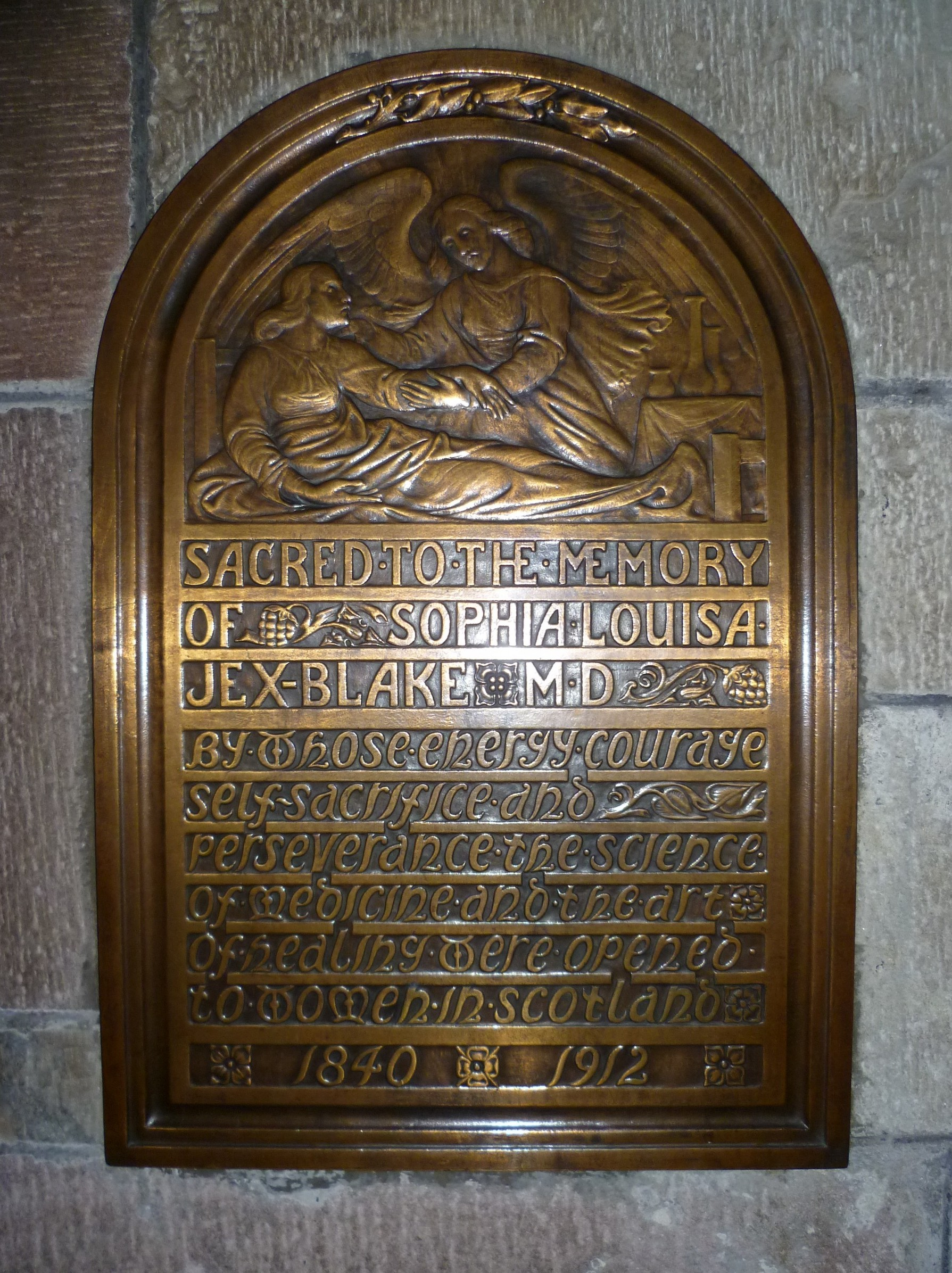
Memorial to Sophia Jex-Blake, designed by Robert Lorimer

Modern sculptures include the memorial to Wellesley Bailey in the south choir aisle, designed by James Simpson (1987) and Merilyn Smith's bronze sculpture of a stool in the south nave aisle, commemorating Jenny Geddes (1992). The most recent memorials are plaques by Kindersley Cardozo Workshop of Cambridge commemorating James Young Simpson (1997) and Ronald Colville, 2nd Baron Clydesmuir (2003) in the Moray Aisle and marking the 500th anniversary of the Royal College of Surgeons of Edinburgh in the north choir aisle (2005).

=== Military memorials ===
==== Victorian ====
Victorian military memorials are concentrated at the west end of the church. The oldest military memorial is John Steell's memorial to members of the 78th (Highlanders) Regiment of Foot killed by disease in Sindh between 1844 and 1845 (1850): this white marble tablet contains a relief of a mourning woman and is located on the west wall of the nave. Nearby is the second-oldest military memorial, William Brodie's Indian Rebellion of 1857 memorial for the 93rd (Sutherland Highlanders) Regiment of Foot (1864): this depicts, in white marble, two Highland soldiers flanking a tomb.

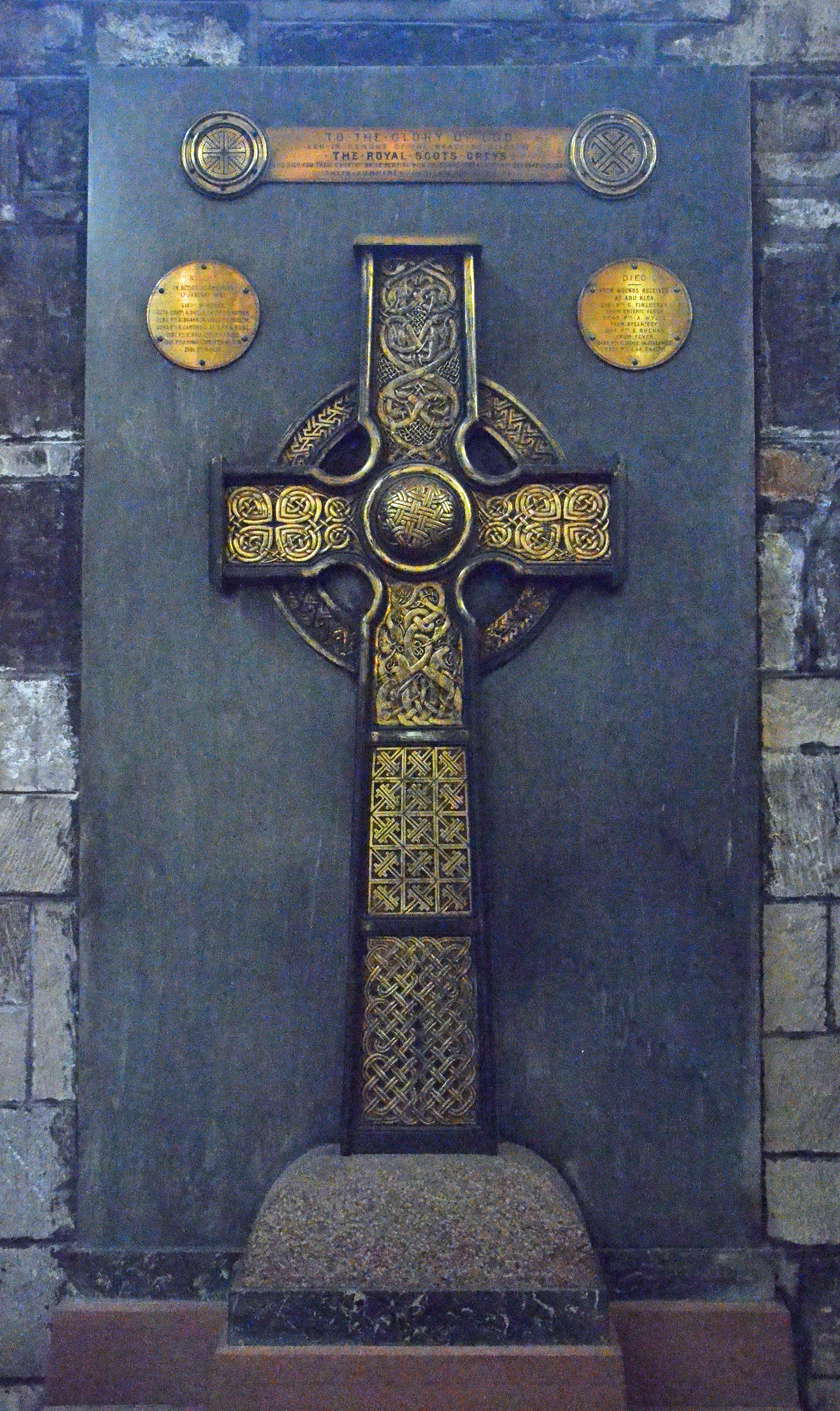
The Royal Scots Greys' Sudan memorial by John Rhind (1886)

John Rhind sculpted the Royal Scots Greys' Sudan memorial (1886): a large brass Celtic cross on grey marble. John Rhind and William Birnie Rhind sculpted the Highland Light Infantry's Second Boer War memorial: a marble-framed brass plaque. William Birnie Rhind and Thomas Duncan Rhind sculpted the Royal Scots 1st Battalion's Second Boer War memorial: a bronze relief within a pedimented marble frame (1903); WS Black designed the Royal Scots 3rd Battalion's Second Boer War memorial: a portrait marble plaque surmounted by an angel flanked by obelisks.

==== World Wars ====
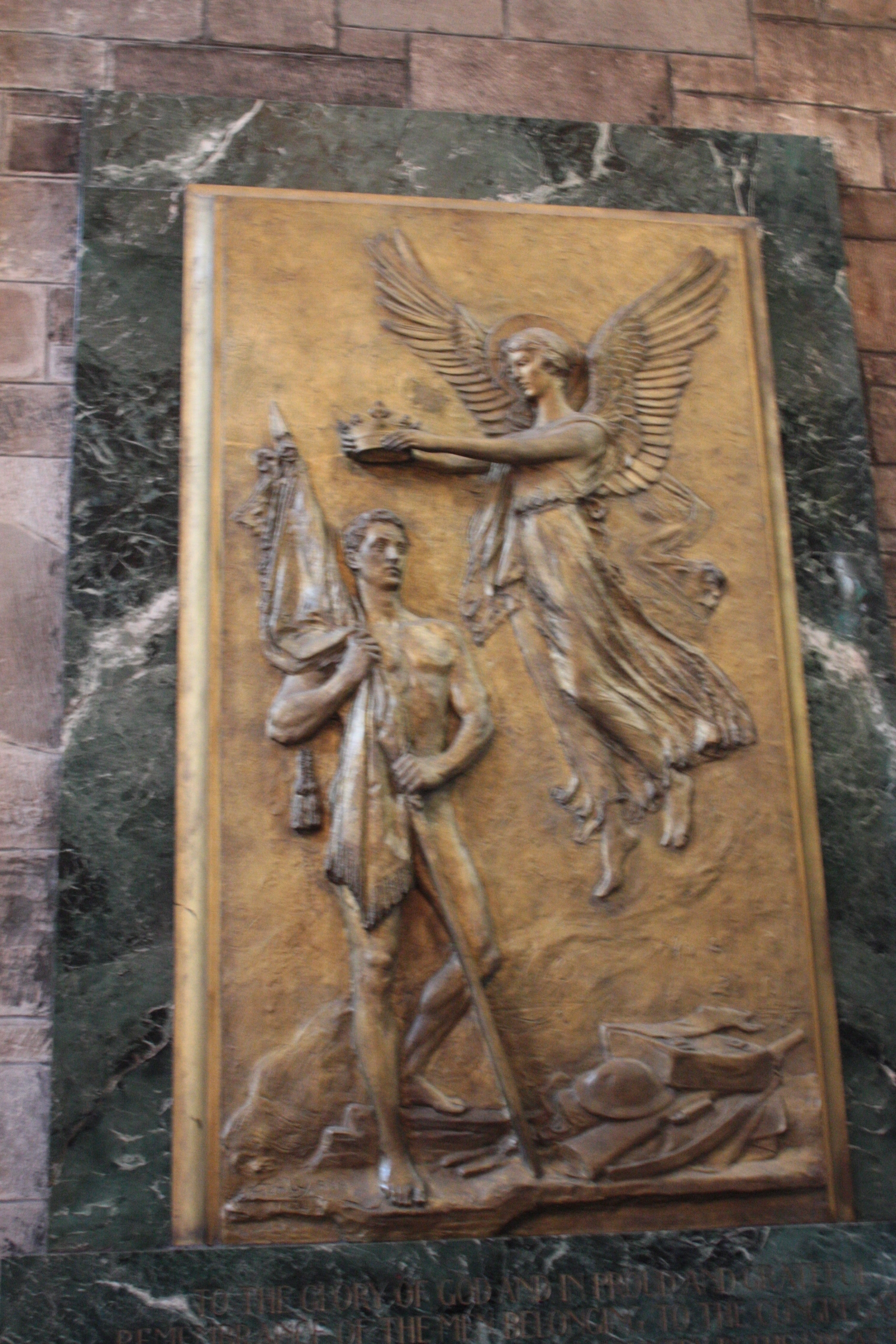
The congregation's First World War memorial by Henry Snell Gamley (1926)

The Elsie Inglis memorial in the north choir aisle was designed by Frank Mears and sculpted in rose-tinted French stone and slate by Pilkington Jackson (1922): it depicts the angels of Faith, Hope, and Love. Jackson also executed the Royal Scots 5th Battalion's Gallipoli Campaign memorial – bronze with a marble tablet (1921) – and the 16th (McCrae's) Battalion's First World War memorial, showing Saint Michael and sculpted in Portland stone: this was designed by Robert Lorimer, who also designed the bronze memorial plaque to the Royal Army Medical Corps in the north choir aisle. Individual victims of the war commemorated in St Giles' include Neil Primrose (1918) and Sir Robert Arbuthnot, 4th Baronet (1917). Ministers and students of the Church of Scotland and United Free Church of Scotland are commemorated by a large oak panel at the east end of the north nave aisle by Messrs Begg and Lorne Campbell (1920).

On 3 November 1921, a memorial service was held in St Giles cathedral to unveil a memorial to the 40 Scottish nurses who died in the First World War. The memorial is a bronze tablet set in green marble. Of the 40 nurses who lost their lives, 4 were killed by enemy action, 3 drowned whilst serving on hospital ships and 33 died of diseases arising from military service.

Henry Snell Gamley is responsible for the congregation's First World War memorial (1926): located in the Albany Aisle, this consists of a large bronze relief of an angel crowning the "spirit of a soldier", its green marble tablet names the 99 members of the congregation killed in the conflict. Gamley is also responsible for the nearby white marble and bronze tablet to Scottish soldiers killed in France (1920); the Royal Scots 9th Battalion's white marble memorial in the south nave aisle (1921); and the bronze relief portrait memorial to Edward Maxwell Salvesen in the north choir aisle (1918).

The names of 38 members of the congregation killed in the Second World War are inscribed on tablets designed by Esmé Gordon within a medieval tomb recess in the Albany Aisle: these were unveiled at the dedication of the Albany Aisle as a war memorial chapel in 1951. As part of this memorial, a cross with panels by Elizabeth Dempster was mounted on the east wall of the Aisle. Other notable memorials of the Second World War include Basil Spence's large wooden plaque to the 94th (City of Edinburgh) Heavy Anti-Aircraft Regiment, Royal Artillery (1954) in the north choir aisle and the nearby Church of Scotland chaplains memorial (1950): this depicts Saint Andrew in bronze relief and was manufactured by Charles Henshaw.

== Features ==
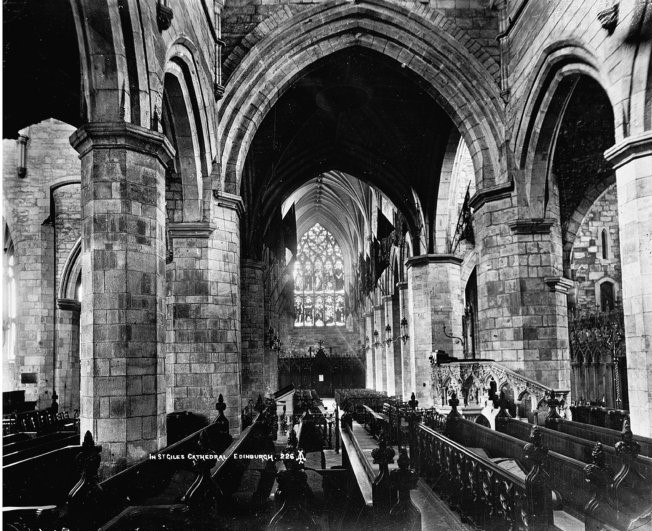
The interior around 1900, looking west from the choir: stalls face each other in the choir and chairs in the nave face east; the pulpit by John Rhind (1883) stands to the right; in the nave, gasoliers by Francis Skidmore and regimental colours hang.

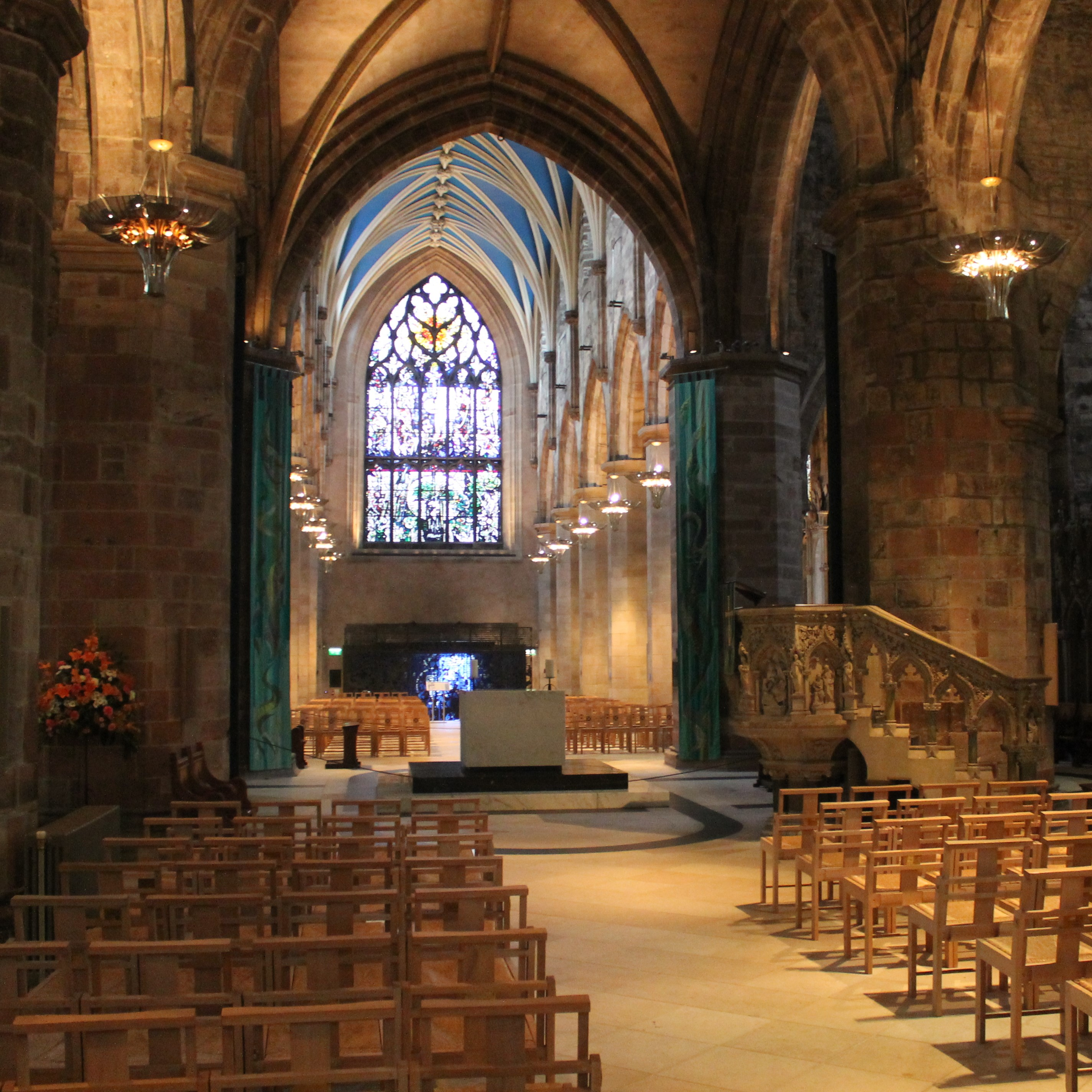
A similar view in the 21st century: the pulpit remains and chairs face the central white marble communion table by Luke Hughes (2011), chandeliers by Lighting Design Partnership (2007–08) are also visible.

Prior to the Reformation, St Giles' was furnished with as many as fifty stone subsidiary altars, each with their own furnishings and plate. The Dean of Guild's accounts from the 16th century also indicate the church possessed an Easter sepulchre, sacrament house, rood loft, lectern, pulpit, wooden chandeliers, and choir stalls. On 16 December 1558, the goldsmith James Mosman weighed and valued the treasures of St Giles' including the reliquary of the saint's arm bone with a diamond ring on his finger, a silver cross, and a ship for incense. At the Reformation, the interior was stripped and a new pulpit at the east side of the crossing became the church's focal point. Seating was installed for children and the burgh's council and trade guilds and a stool of penitence was added. After the Reformation, St Giles' was gradually partitioned into smaller churches.

At the church's restoration by William Hay in 1872–83, the last post-Reformation internal partitions were removed and the church was oriented to face the communion table at the east end; the nave was furnished with chairs and the choir with stalls; a low railing separated the nave from the choir. The Buildings of Scotland series described this arrangement as "High Presbyterian (Low Anglican)". Most of the church's furnishings date from this restoration onwards. From 1982, the church was reoriented with seats in the choir and nave facing a central communion table under the crossing.

=== Furniture ===
==== Pulpits, tables, and font ====
The pulpit dates to 1883 and was carved in Caen stone and green marble by John Rhind to a design by William Hay. The pulpit is octagonal with relief panels depicting the acts of mercy. An octagonal oak pulpit of 1888 with a tall steepled canopy stands in the Moray Aisle: this was designed by Robert Rowand Anderson. St Giles' possessed a wooden pulpit prior to the Reformation. In April 1560, this was replaced with a wooden pulpit with two locking doors, likely located at the east side of the crossing; a lectern was also installed. A brass eagle lectern stands on the south side of the crossing: this was given by an anonymous couple for use in the Moray Aisle. The bronze lectern steps were sculpted by Jacqueline Stieger and donated in 1991 by the Normandy Veterans' Association. Until 1982, a Caen stone lectern, designed by William Hay stood opposite the pulpit at the west end of the choir.

Situated in the crossing, the communion table is a Carrara marble block unveiled in 2011: it was donated by Roger Lindsay and designed by Luke Hughes. This replaced a wooden table in use since 1982. The plain communion table used after the Chambers restoration was donated to the West Parish Church of Stirling in 1910 and replaced by an oak communion table designed by Robert Lorimer and executed by Nathaniel Grieve. The table displays painted carvings of the Lamb of God, Saint Giles, and angels; it was lengthened in 1953 by Scott Morton & Co. and now stands in the Preston Aisle. The Albany Aisle contains a neo-Jacobean communion table by Whytock and Reid, which was installed at the time of the Aisle's dedication as a war memorial chapel in 1951. A small communion table with Celtic knot and floral designs was added to the Preston Aisle in 2019; this was designed by Sheanna Ashton and made by Grassmarket Furniture.

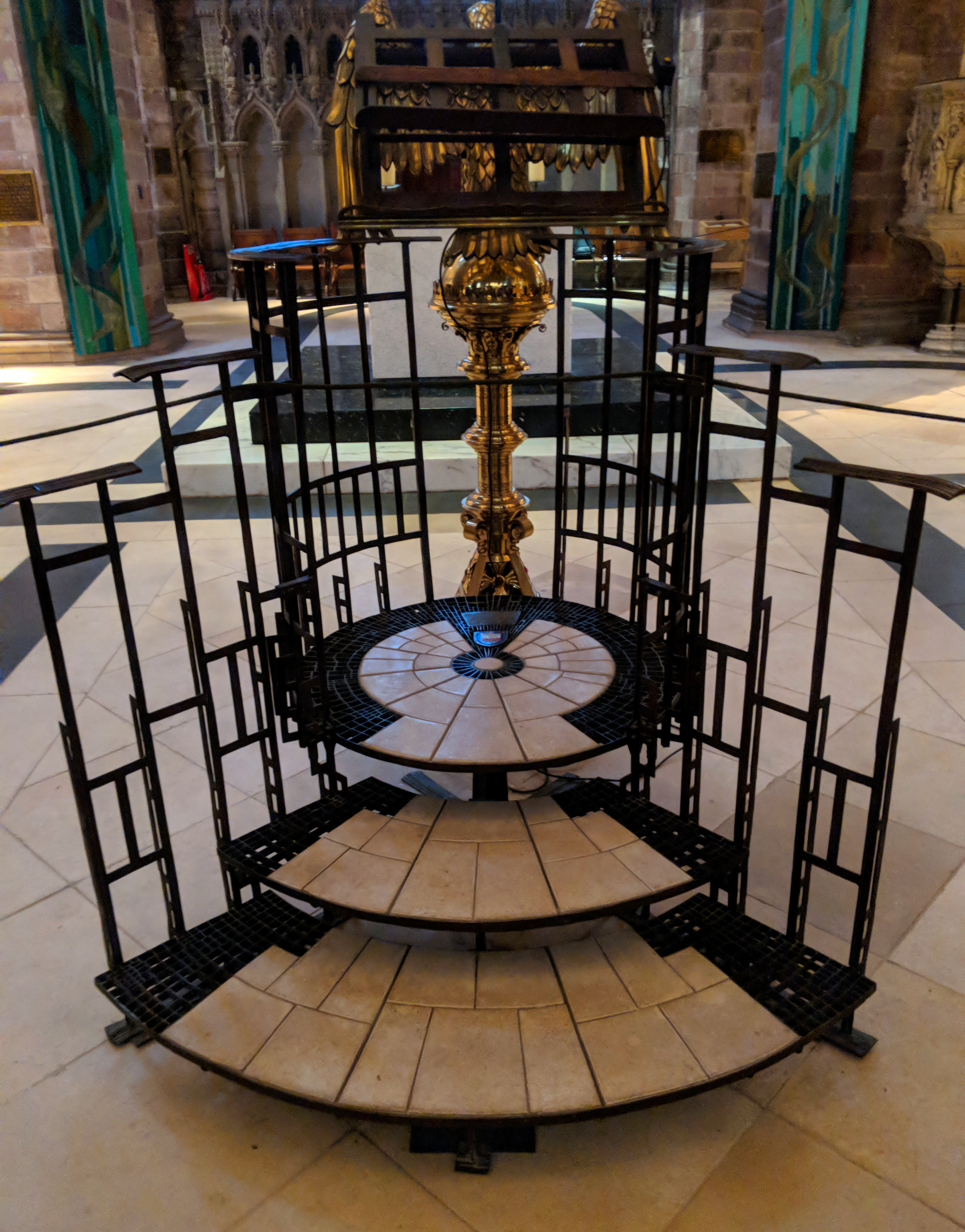
The eagle lectern (1886) and steps by Jacqueline Stieger (1991)

The communion table and reredos of the Chambers Aisle were designed by Robert Lorimer and John Fraser Matthew in 1927–29. The reredos contains a relief of the adoration of the infant Christ by angels: this is the work of Morris and Alice Meredith Williams. In 1931, Matthew designed a reredos and communion table for the Moray Aisle; these were removed in 1981 and later sold to the National Museum of Scotland. A reredos in the form of a Gothic arcade stood at the east end of the church from the Chambers restoration; this was designed by William Hay and executed in Caen stone with green marble pillars. In 1953, this was replaced with a fabric reredos, designed by Esmé Gordon. The Gordon reredos was removed in 1971; the east wall is now bare.

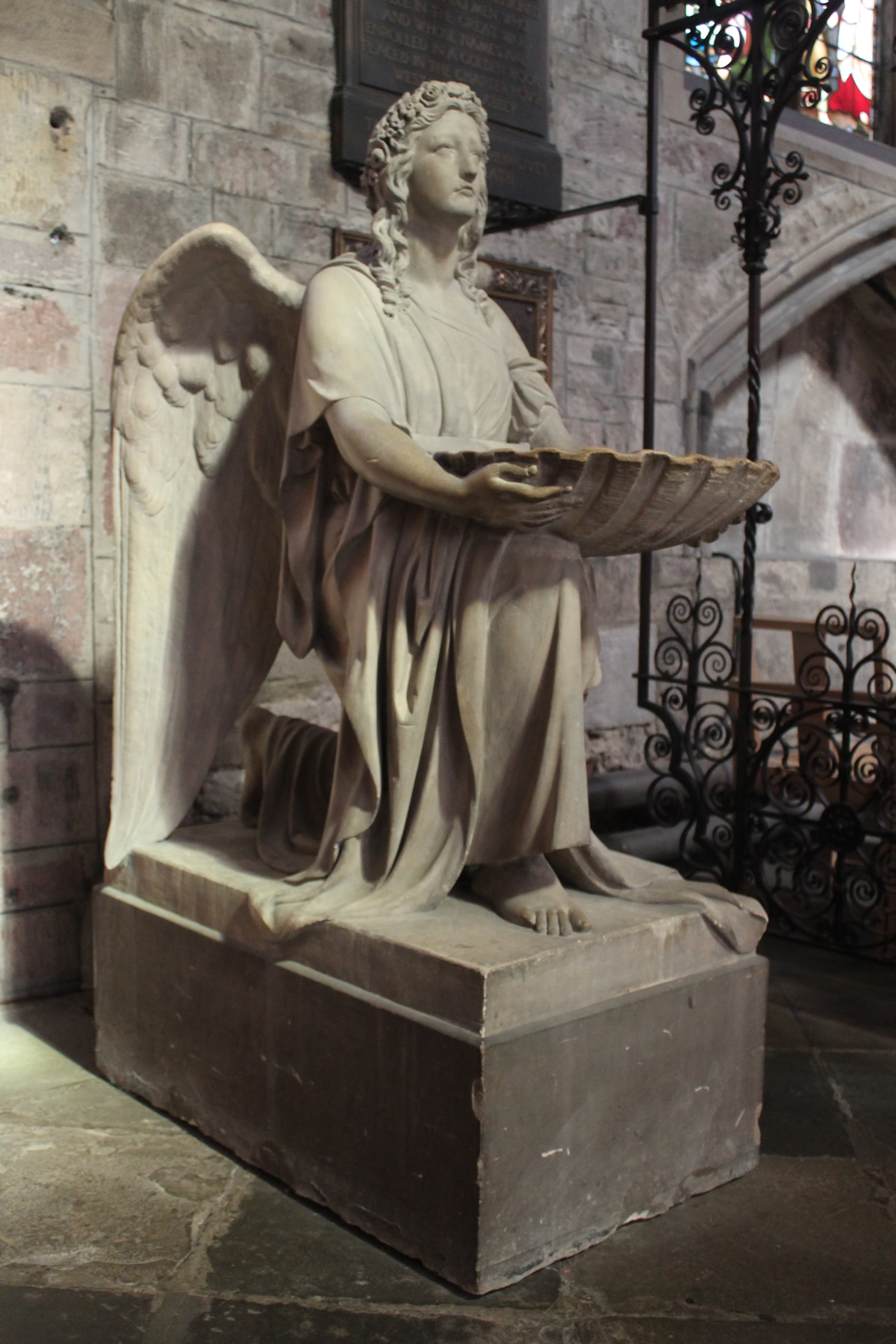
Font by John Rhind

The Caen stone font by John Rhind is in the form of a kneeling angel holding a scallop; the font is an exact replica of Bertel Thorvaldsen's font for the Church of Our Lady, Copenhagen. Initially, it stood near the pulpit before being moved to the west end of the south nave aisle; between 1916 and 1951, it stood in the Albany Aisle; it was then moved to near the west door and has stood in the north choir aisle since 2015.

==== Seating ====
Since 2003, new chairs, many of which bear small brass plaques naming donors, have replaced chairs of the 1880s by West and Collier throughout the church. Two banks of choir stalls in a semi-circular arrangement occupy the south transept; these were installed by Whytock & Reid in 1984. Whytock & Reid also provided box pews for the nave in 1985; these have since been removed. In 1552, prior to the Reformation, Andrew Mansioun executed the south bank of choir stalls; the north bank were likely imported. In 1559, at the outset of the Scottish Reformation, these were removed to the Tolbooth for safe-keeping; they may have been re-used to furnish the church after the Reformation.

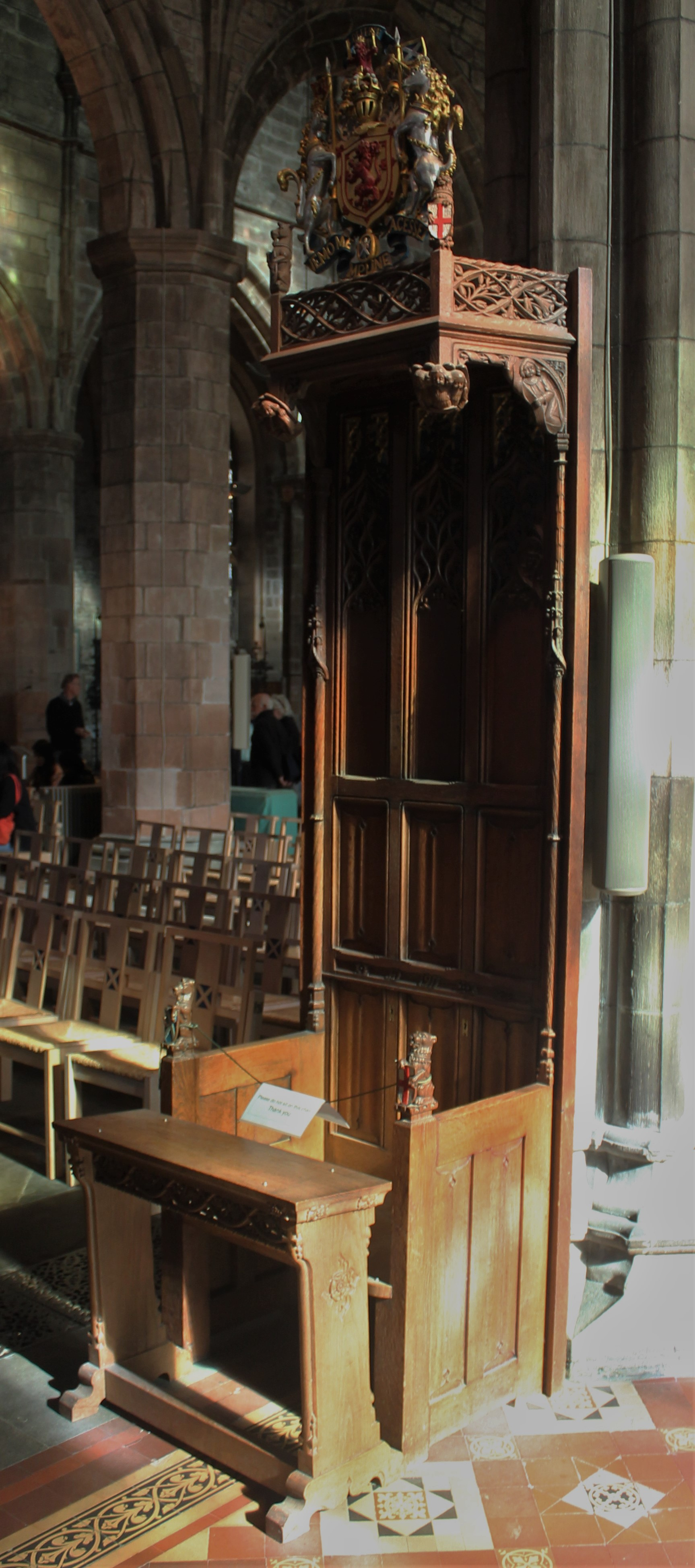
The royal pew

There has been a royal loft or pew in St Giles' since the regency of Mary of Guise. (Note: James VI's royal loft was in the Old Kirk; from the reign of Charles I to the removal of partitions in 1883, the royal loft or pew was in the East or High Kirk.) Standing between the south choir aisle and Preston Aisle, the current monarch's seat possess a tall back and canopy, on which stand the royal arms of Scotland; this oak seat and desk were created in 1953 to designs of Esmé Gordon and incorporate elements of the former royal pew of 1885 by William Hay. Hay's royal pew stood in the Preston Aisle; it replaced an oak royal pew of 1873, also designed by Hay and executed by John Taylor & Son: this was re-purposed as an internal west porch and was removed in 2008.

=== Metalwork, lighting, and plate ===
The gates and railings of the Albany Aisle, the St Eloi Aisle, the Holy Blood Aisle, and the Chepman Aisle are the work of Francis Skidmore and date from the Chambers restoration. Skidmore also produced the chancel railing – now removed – and the iron screens at the east end of the north choir aisle: these originally surrounded the Moray Aisle. The gates and font bracket in the Chambers Aisle are by Thomas Hadden and date from the aisle's designation as the Chapel of Youth in 1927–29. The west door is surrounded by a metal and blue glass screen of 2008 by Leifur Breiðfjörð.

The church is lit by stainless steel and aluminium chandeliers as well as by concealed strip lights below the windows. The chandeliers are designed to evoke lilies and were produced between 2007 and 2008 by Lighting Design Partnership near Edinburgh; they replaced a concealed lighting system of 1958. In 1882, during the Chambers restoration, Francis Skidmore provided a set of gas chandeliers based on a chandelier in St Mary Redcliffe, Bristol. Electric lighting was installed in 1911 and Robert Lorimer designed new electric chandeliers; at their removal in 1958, some of these were donated to St John's Kirk, Perth and Cleish Church. A red glass "Lamp of Remembrance" by Thomas Hadden hangs in the Albany Aisle: its steel frame imitates St Giles' crown steeple. A lamp with stained glass panels by Douglas Strachan hangs in the Chambers Aisle.

Plate in possession of the church includes four communion cups dated 1643 and two flagons dated 1618 and given by George Montaigne, then Bishop of Lincoln. Among the church's silver are two plates dated 1643 and a ewer dated 1609.

=== Clocks and bells ===
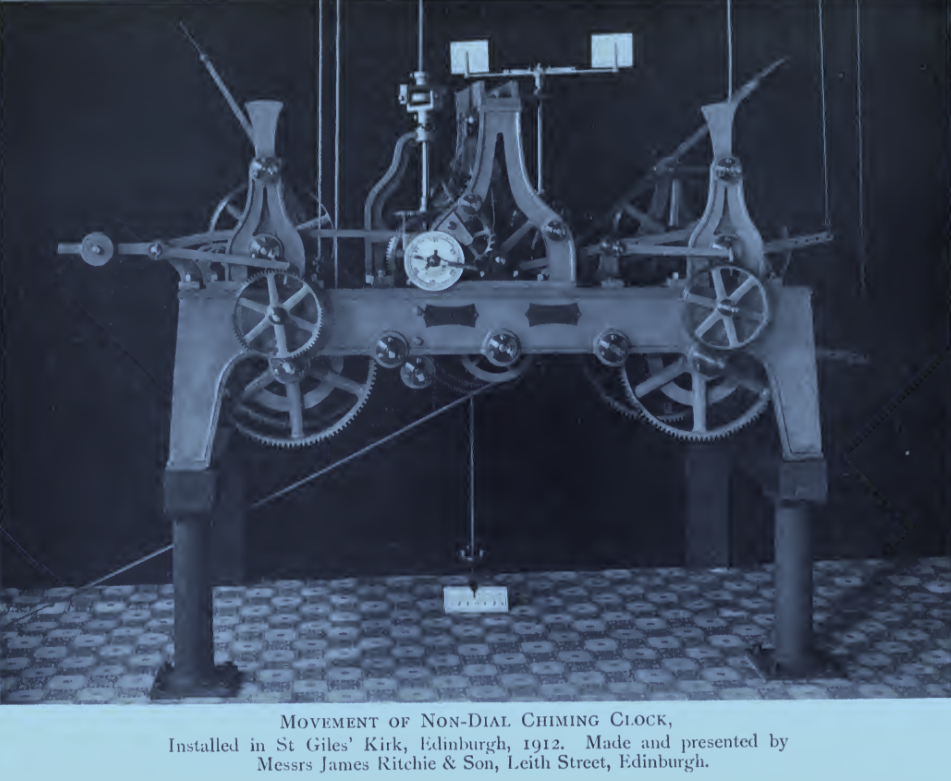
The clock of 1912

The current clock was manufactured by James Ritchie & Son and installed in 1912. It has no dial, but strikes the hours and the quarters. The great wheel of the mechanism is 16 inches (41 cm) in diameter and the pendulum is 13 feet (4.0 m) long with a ball weight of 5 cwt. The hour bell weighs 30 cwt.

The clock of 1911 replaced a clock of 1721 by Langley Bradley of London, which is now housed in the Museum of Edinburgh. In 1861 the mechanism was improved by James Ritchie & Son by changing it from a 30 hour to an 8-day wind.

A clock is recorded in 1491. Between 1585 and 1721, the former clock of Lindores Abbey was used in St Giles'.

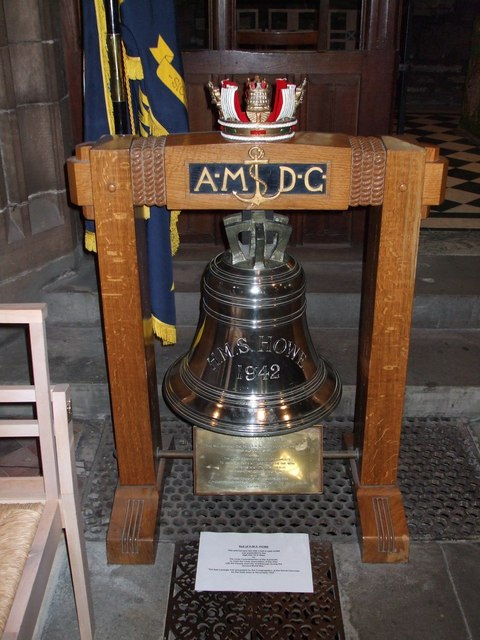
The bell of HMS Howe

The hour bell of the cathedral was cast in 1846 by the Whitechapel Bell Foundry, possibly from the metal of the medieval Great Bell, which had been taken down about 1774. The Great Bell was cast in Flanders in 1460 by John and William Hoerhen and bore the arms of Guelderland and an image of the Virgin and Child. (Note: The Great Bell was inscribed, in Latin: "HONORABILES VIRI BURGENSES VILLAE DE EDINBVRGH IN SCOTIA HANC CAMPANAM FIERI FECERVNT ANNO DNI. M.CCCC.LVV: JOHS. ET WILHELMVS HOERHEN ME FECERVNT: IPSAMQVE CAMPANAM GYELIS VOCARI VOLVERVNT: DEFVNCTOS PLANGO: VIVOS VOCO: FVLMINA FRANGO" ("The honourable burgesses of the town of Edinburgh in Scotland had the bell made in the year of Our Lord 1460: John and William Hoehren made me: They wished it to be called the Bell of Saint Giles. I toll the knell of the dead: I call the living to prayer: I break the force of the lightning.").) Robert Maxwell cast the second bell in 1706 and the third in 1728: these chime the quarters, the latter bears the coat of arms of Edinburgh. Between 1700 and 1890, a carillon of 23 bells, manufactured in 1698 and 1699 by John Meikle, hung in the tower. Daniel Defoe, who visited Edinburgh in 1727, praised the bells but added "they are heard much better at a distance than near at hand". In 1955, an anonymous elder donated one of the carillon's bells: it hangs in a Gothic wooden frame next to the Chambers Aisle. Nearby hangs the bell of HMS Howe: this was presented in 1955 by the Admiralty to mark the ship's connection to Edinburgh. The bell hangs in a frame topped by a naval crown: this was made from Howe's deck timbers. The vesper bell of 1464 stands in the south nave aisle.

=== Flags and heraldry ===
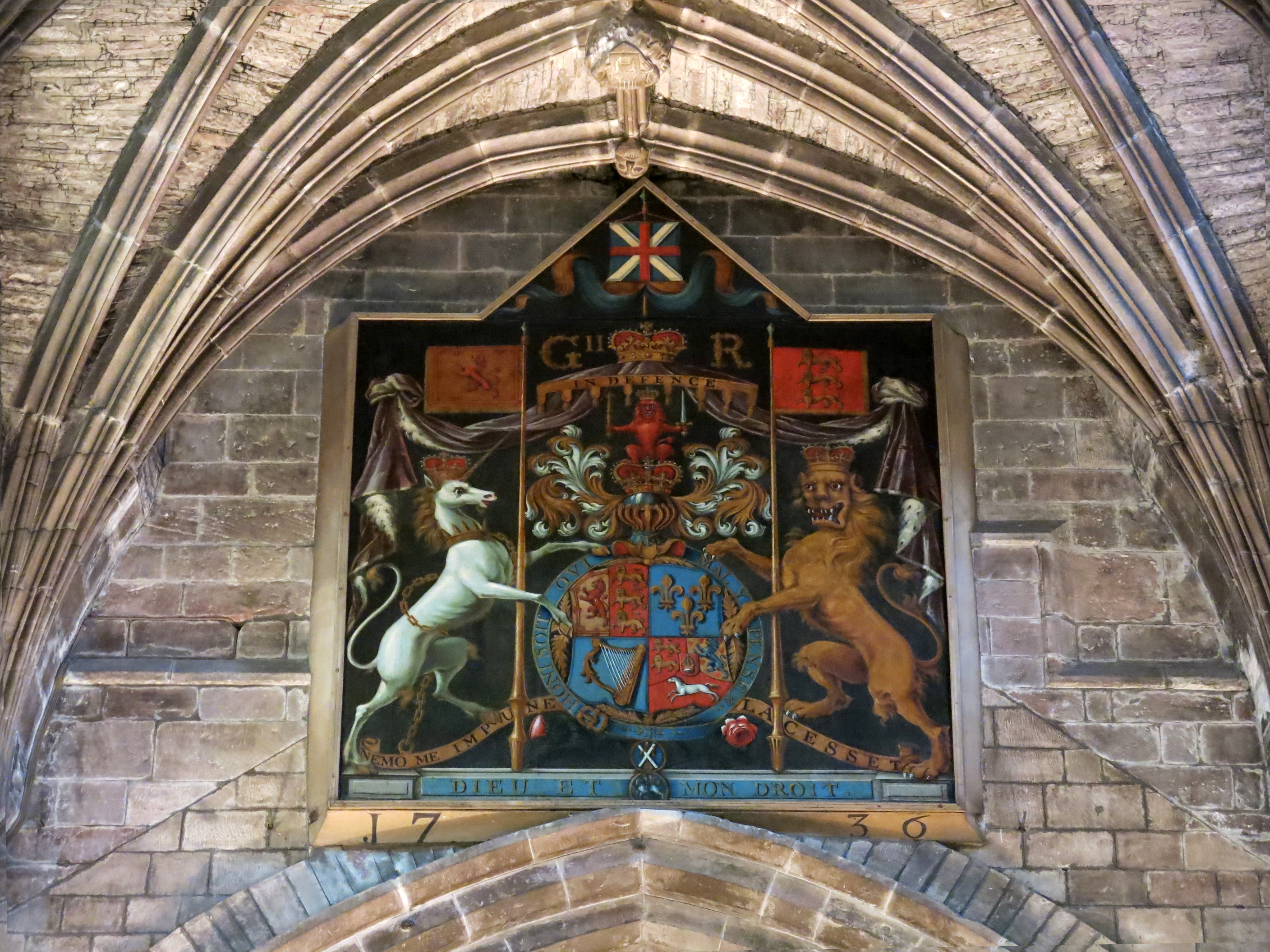
The arms of George II by Roderick Chalmers (1736)

From 1883, regimental colours were hung in the nave. In 1982, the Scottish Command of the British Army offered to catalogue and preserve the colours. The colours were removed from the nave and 29 were reinstated in the Moray Aisle. Since 1953, the banners of the current knights of the Thistle have hung in the Preston Aisle, near the entrance to the Thistle Chapel. The banner of Douglas Haig hangs in the Chambers Aisle; this was donated in 1928 by Lady Haig after her husband's lying-in-state in St Giles'. A large wooden panel, showing the arms of George II hangs on the tower wall above at the west end of the choir: this is dated 1736 and was painted by Roderick Chalmers.

The Fetternear Banner, the only surviving religious banner from pre-Reformation Scotland, was made around 1520 for the Confraternity of the Holy Blood, which had its altar in the Lauder Aisle. The banner, which depicts the wounded Christ and the instruments of His passion, is held by the National Museum of Scotland.

=== National Covenant ===
St Giles' possesses one of the original copies of Scotland's National Covenant of 1638. The copy in St Giles' was signed by leading Covenanters, including James Graham, 1st Marquess of Montrose; John Leslie, 6th Earl of Rothes; and John Kennedy, 6th Earl of Cassilis. The Covenant remained in the possession of the family of the Laird of Dundas until 1924, when it was purchased by Alexander Wallace and donated to St Giles' in 1926. It now stands in a plain oak frame in the Chepman Aisle.

== Thistle Chapel ==
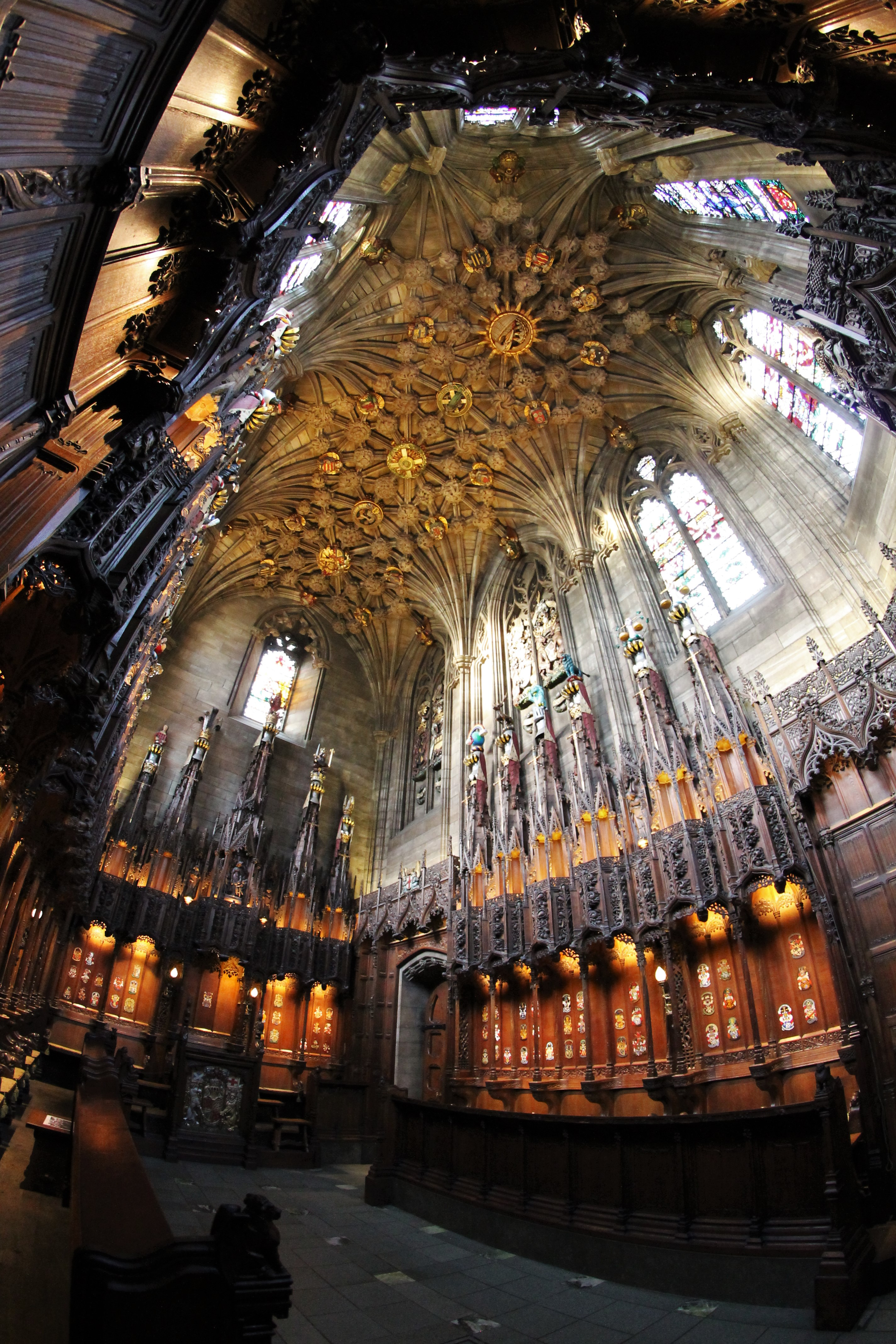
The interior of the Thistle Chapel, looking west

Located at the south-east corner of St Giles', the Thistle Chapel is the chapel of the Order of the Thistle; it is accessed externally by the east door of the church and from the church itself by the south choir aisle.

At the foundation of the Order of the Thistle in 1687, James VII ordered Holyrood Abbey be fitted out as a chapel for the Knights. At James' deposition the following year, a mob destroyed the chapel's interior before the Knights ever met there. In the 19th and early 20th centuries, multiple proposals were made either to refurbish Holyrood Abbey for the Order of the Thistle or to create a chapel within St Giles' Cathedral. In 1906, after the sons Ronald Leslie-Melville, 11th Earl of Leven donated £24,000 from their late father's estate, Edward VII ordered a new Chapel to be constructed on the south side of St Giles'.

The Trustees appointed by the King to oversee the chapel's construction appointed Robert Lorimer as architect. The Trustees insisted the choice of craftspeople should reflect the national character of the chapel. Lorimer assembled a team of leading figures in the Scottish Arts and Crafts movement, including Phoebe Anna Traquair for enamelwork, Douglas Strachan for stained glass, Joseph Hayes for stonework, and the brothers William and Alexander Clow for woodwork. Louis Davis – who supplied stained glass – and the Bromsgrove Guild – who supplied bronze fittings – were the only major contributors based outside Scotland. Construction began in November 1909 and the chapel was completed a little over a year later. After its official opening in July 1911, George V knighted Lorimer for his work. Through the continuing addition of stall plates, crests, and banners for new knights and ladies, the chapel's tradition of craftsmanship persists to the present day. The knights and ladies of the Thistle meet in the Chapel at least once a year.

Architectural critics have noted Lorimer's successful use of a limited site to create a soaring work of Gothic architecture, rich with architectural details. A number of critics have emphasised the chapel's importance as a product of the Arts and Crafts movement, in which the collaborative craftsmanship of individual artisans defines the overall effect. Some critics have also emphasised the chapel's political role as an expression of Scottish patriotism, British imperialism, and monarchism.

== Worship ==
=== Services and liturgy ===
St Giles' holds three services every Sunday:

- 9.30 a.m.: Morning Service – Choir, Sermon, Holy Communion
- 11.00 a.m.: Morning Service – Choir, Sermon
- 6 p.m.: St Giles' At Six – Programme of Music

Every weekday a service is held at 12 noon. Sunday morning service is also live-streamed from the St Giles' Cathedral YouTube channel.

Prior to the Reformation, St Giles' used the Sarum Use, with High Mass being celebrated at the high altar and Low Mass celebrated at the subsidiary altars. After the Reformation, services were conducted according to the Book of Common Order; unaccompanied congregation singing of the Psalms replaced choral and organ music and preaching replaced the Mass as the central focus of worship; public penance was also introduced. Communion services were initially held three times a year; the congregation sat around trestle tables: a practice that continued until the 1870s. The attempted replacement of the Book of Common Order by a Scottish version of the Book of Common Prayer on 23 July 1637 sparked rioting, which led to the signing of the National Covenant. From 1646, the Directory for Public Worship was used. During the Commonwealth, the Directory fell out of use; public penance, psalm-singing, and Bible readings were removed from the service and lay preaching was introduced. Between 1648 and 1655, the ministers withheld communion in protest. During the second imposition of episcopacy under Charles II and James VII the liturgy reverted to its post-Reformation form and there was no attempt to bring it into line with the practice of the Church of England. By the beginning of the 18th century, the services of the Book of Common Order had been replaced by extempore prayers.

Cameron Lees, minister between 1877 and 1911, was a leading figure in the liturgical revival among Scottish Presbyterian churches in the latter half of the 19th century. Lees used the Church Service Society's Euchologion for communion services and compiled the St Giles' Book of Common Order: this directed daily and Sunday services between 1884 and 1926. Under Lees, Christmas, Easter, and Watchnight services were introduced. With financial support from John Ritchie Findlay, daily service was also introduced for the first time since the Commonwealth. Lees' successor, Andrew Wallace Williamson continued this revival and revised the St Giles' Book of Common Order. A weekly communion service was introduced by Williamson's successor, Charles Warr. The current pattern of four Sunday services, including two communions, was adopted in 1983 during the incumbency of Gilleasbuig Macmillan. Macmillan introduced a number of changes to communion services, including the practice of communicants' gathering round the central communion table and passing elements to each other.

=== Notable services ===
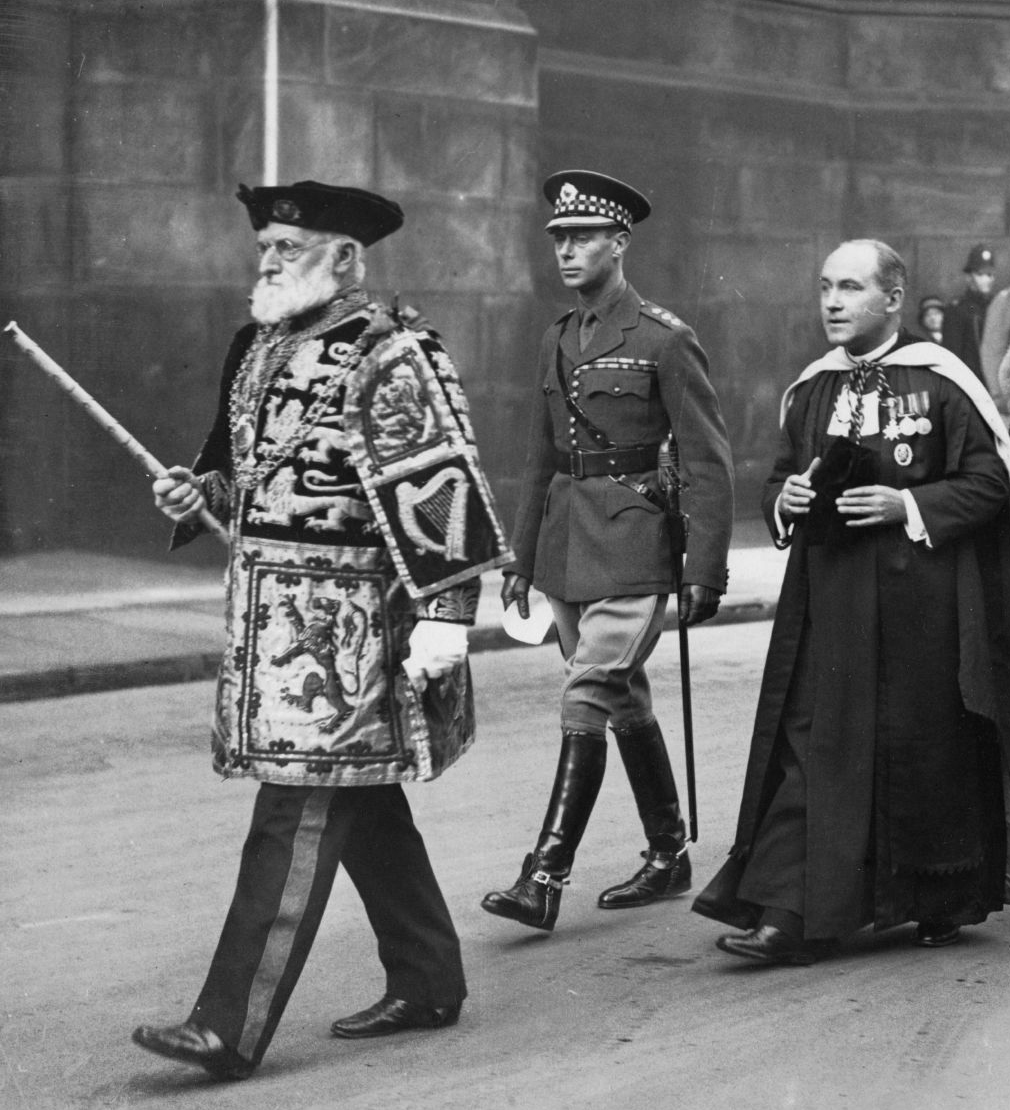
Charles Warr, Minister of St Giles' (right), accompanies the Duke of York (middle) on Remembrance Sunday, 1933.

Since the medieval period, St Giles' has hosted regular and occasional services of civic and national significance. Important annual services held in St Giles include the Edinburgh's civic Remembrance Sunday service, the Kirking of the council for the city council, the Kirking of the Courts for the legal profession, the Thistle Service for the Knights of the Thistle; and a service during the General Assembly of the Church of Scotland. The Kirking of the Parliament has been held in St Giles' at the opening of every new session of the Scottish Parliament since the Parliament's foundation in 1999; this revives an earlier service for the Parliament of Scotland.

St Giles' has also long enjoyed a close connection with the Scottish, then British royal families; the royal Knights of Thistle, including the Queen as Sovereign of the Order, attend the Thistle service in St Giles' every second year. Since the regency of Mary of Guise, there has been a royal pew or loft in St Giles'. Notable services for the royal family include the Requiem Mass for James I (1437); the service to welcome Anne of Denmark to Scotland (1590); divine service during the visit of George IV (1822); and Elizabeth II's receipt of the Honours of Scotland (1953).

Significant occasional services in St Giles' include the memorial Mass for the dead of Flodden (1513); thanksgivings for the Scottish Reformation (1560), the Union (1707), and Victory in Europe Day (1945); and the service to mark the opening of the first Edinburgh International Festival (1947). Recent occasional services have marked the return to Scotland of the Stone of Scone (1996) and the opening of the National Museum of Scotland (1998); a service of reconciliation after the 2014 Scottish independence referendum was also held in St Giles'.

St Giles' hosted the lyings-in-state of Elsie Inglis (1917) and Douglas Haig (1928). Notable recent funerals include those of Robin Cook (2005) and John Bellany (2013). Notable recent weddings include the marriage of Chris Hoy to Sarra Kemp (2010).

=== Choir ===
St Giles' Cathedral Choir is a mixed choir of 30 adults, directed by the Master of Music, Michael Harris. The Choir sings at the 10 am Communion and 11.30 am morning services on Sundays. The Choir first toured internationally, to the US, in 2004 and has since toured frequently in Europe and North America. The Choir has also appeared in television and radio broadcasts, including Choral Evensong, and has released recordings on its own label, Aegidius.

The current Choir was founded in 1879. This revived a tradition of choral music at St Giles': until the Reformation, a song school was attached to St Giles' where four official choristers were educated alongside other boys. The song school fell into disrepair after the departure of its master, John Fethy, in 1551; however, Edward Henderson oversaw its restoration in the years immediately preceding the Reformation. After the Reformation, Henderson continued to teach music there as well as leading the unaccompanied congregational singing of psalms.

=== Pipe organ ===
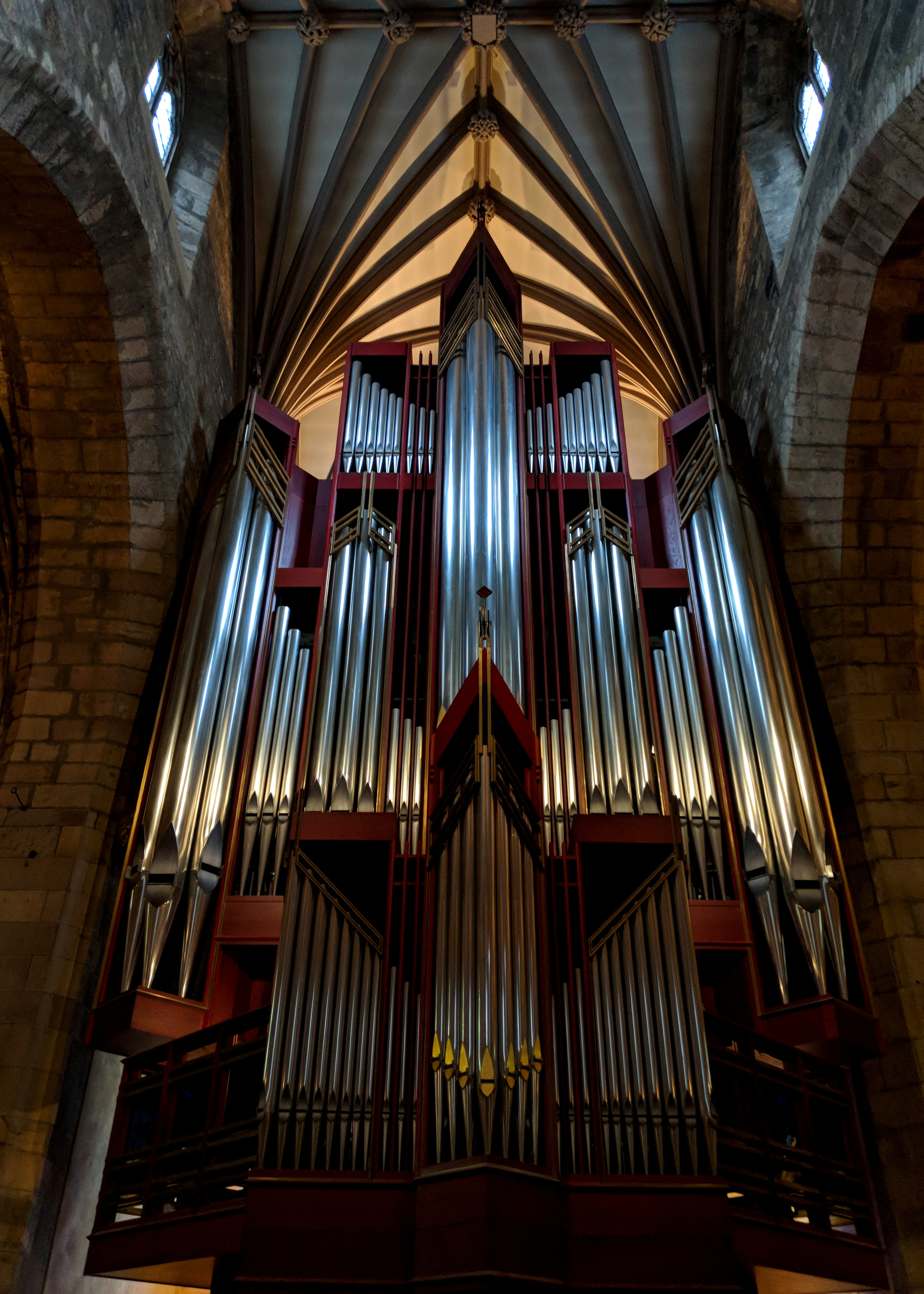
The pipe organ, built by Rieger Orgelbau and dedicated in 1992

The pipe organ was completed in 1992 and is located in the south transept: it was made by Rieger Orgelbau and donated by Alastair Salvesen. Douglas Laird designed the case: it imitates the prow of a ship and uses red-stained Austrian oak along with decorative bronze and glass features. The organ has 4,156 pipes, most of which are tin. The Glocken is a ring of 37 bells made by the Whitechapel Bell Foundry.

The current organ replaced a Harrison & Harrison organ of 1878, the first organ in the church since the Reformation. This organ initially possessed 2 manuals and 26 stops. Between 1872 and this organ's installation, a harmonium was used in services. Harrison & Harrison rebuilt the organ in 1883 and 1887. Eustace Ingram rebuilt the organ as a 4 manual, 60 stop instrument in 1895. Ingram & Co rebuilt the organ in 1909 and overhauled it between 1936 and 1939. The organ was reconstructed in 1940 by Henry Willis & Sons as a 4 manual, 74 stop instrument with a new console and an extra console in the Moray Aisle; a new case was designed by Esmé Gordon: this incorporated statues of angels and Jubal by Elizabeth Dempster. The second console was removed in 1980 and Willis overhauled the organ in 1982. The organ was removed in 1990, some of the pipes were removed to the McEwan Hall, Peebles Old Parish Church, and the Scottish Theatre Organ Preservation Trust; two were incorporated in the replacement organ; the console was donated to a church in Perth.

Since 1996, Michael Harris has served as organist and Master of Music; he is assisted by Jordan English. Since the insertion of the first post-Reformation organ in 1878, the following people have served as organist of St Giles':

- 1878–1923: John Hartley
- 1923–1944: Wilfrid Greenhouse Allt
- 1946–1996: Herrick Bunney
- 1996–present: Michael Harris

== Ministry ==
=== Clergy ===
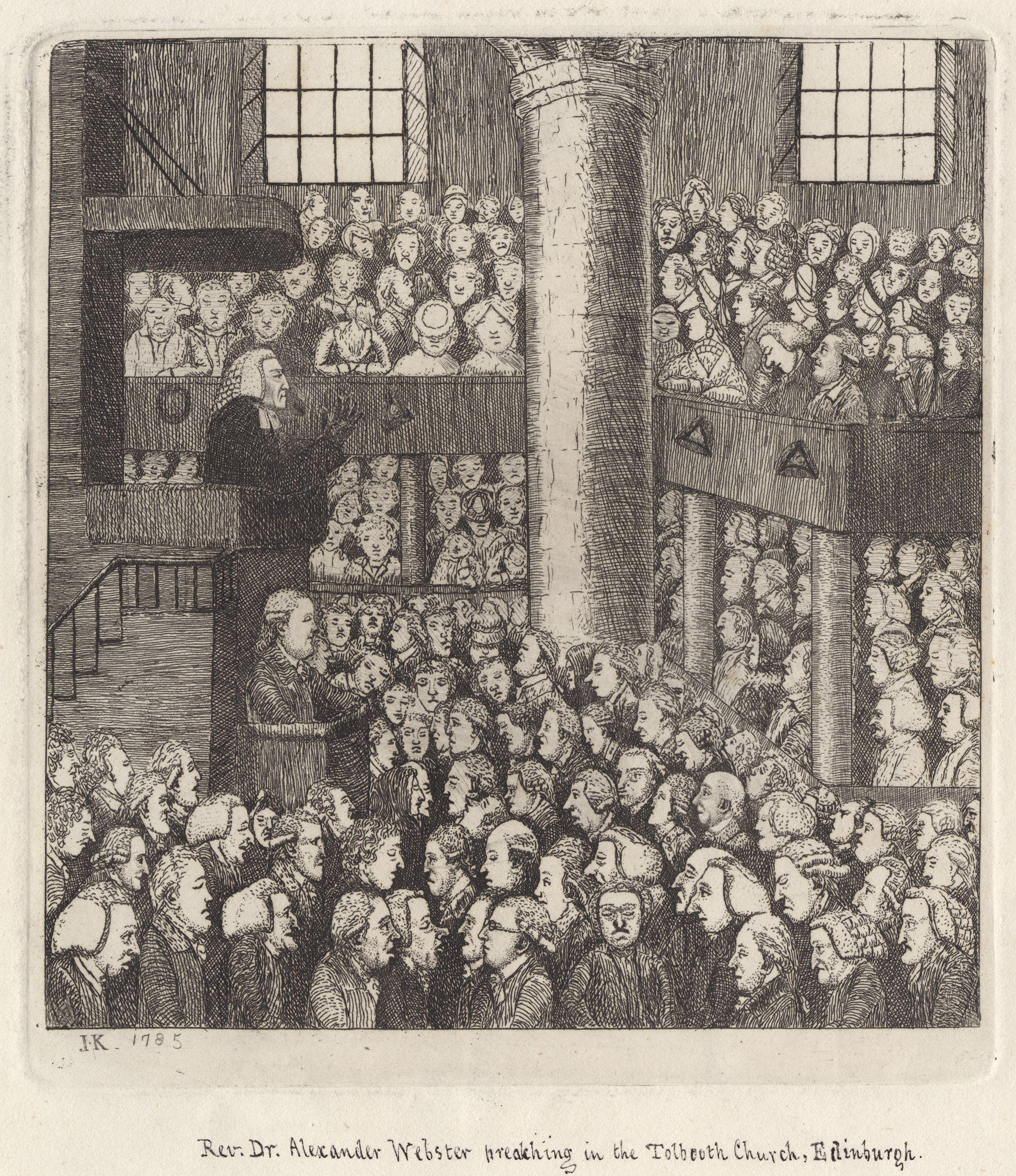
Alexander Webster preaches in the Tolbooth Kirk in a 1785 caricature by John Kay.

The Minister of St Giles' is Scott Rennie. His immediate predecessor was Calum MacLeod, who was translated from Fourth Presbyterian Church, Chicago in 2014. The Minister immediately prior to this was Gilleasbuig Macmillan, who was appointed minister in 1973 and retired in 2013. St Giles' Assistant Minister is Sigrid Marten. From Cameron Lees to Gilleasbuig Macmillan, the minister of St Giles' served as Dean of the Thistle; Lees and his two successors, Andrew Wallace Williamson and Charles Warr, also served as Dean of the Chapel Royal in Scotland. In 1980, Helen Alexander was appointed assistant minister, becoming the first woman to minister in St Giles'. Alongside the minister, St Giles' has a Kirk Session of around 50 elders.

The first vicar of St Giles' recorded by name is John, who appended his name to a charter of Holyrood Abbey in 1241. Three successive vicars of St Giles' in the 15th century – John Methven, Nicholas Otterbourne, and Thomas Bully – were noted churchmen who also held senior positions in the Scottish royal court. In 1467, a bull of Pope Paul II made St Giles' a collegiate church and replaced the role of vicar with a provost accompanied by a curate and sixteen canons. William Forbes, the last vicar of St Giles' was promoted as its first provost. Forbes was succeeded by Gavin Douglas, who completed his Middle Scots translation of Virgil's Aeneid, Eneados, in 1513 while provost.

In 1559, John Knox, leader of the Scottish Reformation became the first Protestant minister of St Giles', serving intermittently until his death in 1572. Knox's successors were influential in opposing the religious reforms of James VI. Though St Giles' had been partitioned into smaller churches, ministers were only allocated to specific churches after the division of Edinburgh into parishes in 1598. Between 1633 and 1638 and again between 1661 and 1689, St Giles' served as the seat of the bishop of Edinburgh and was served by a dean and prebendaries. Notable ministers in St Giles' during the 18th century include the influential Covenanter and Whig, William Carstares; the evangelical preacher, Alexander Webster; and Hugh Blair, a leading figure of the Scottish Enlightenment.

=== Parish and historic congregations ===
The current parish of St Giles' (or the High Kirk) covers a portion of Edinburgh's Old Town bounded by the railway, George IV Bridge, the Cowgate, and St Mary's Street. Between 1641 and 1929, the High Kirk's parish covered the north side of the High Street. From the medieval period until 1598, St Giles' parish covered the entire burgh of Edinburgh. Prior to the Reformation, St Giles' was within the Deanery of Linlithgow in the Archdiocese of St Andrews.

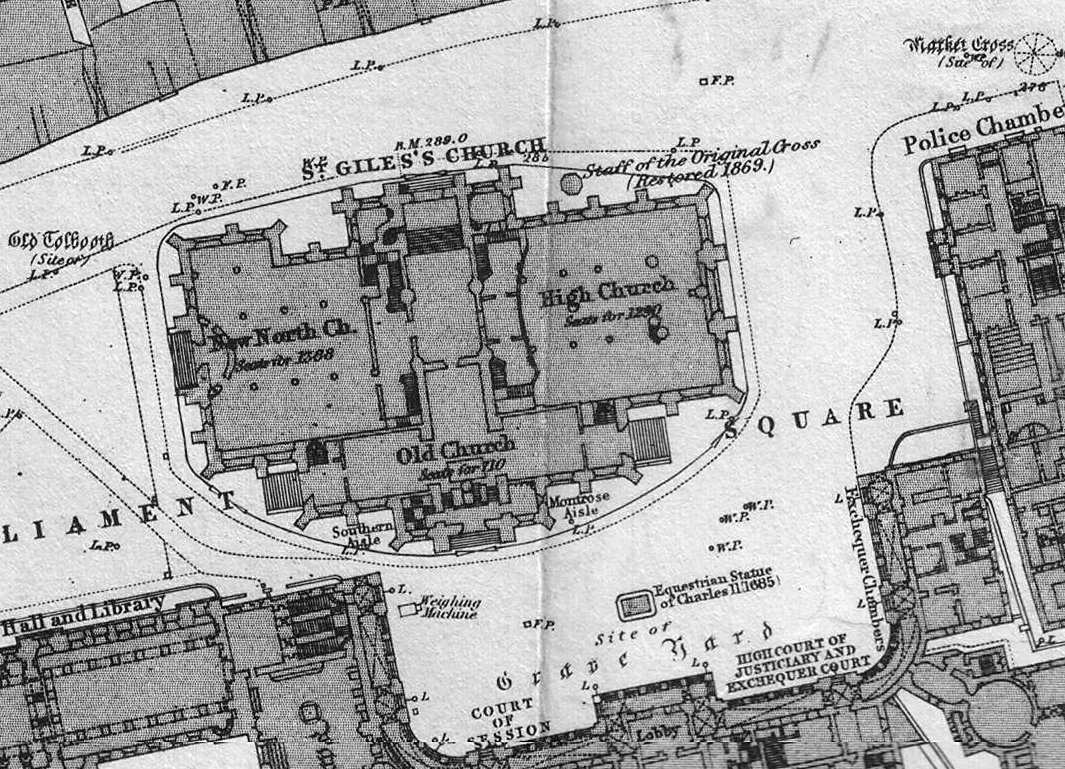
A map of 1877, showing the New North, Old, and High divisions prior to the Chambers restoration

Between 1561 and 1564, the west of the nave was partitioned: the upper floor served as a place of worship and the ground floor served as an extension to the Tolbooth. Around 1581, the choir was partitioned off to create the New or East Kirk, leaving the crossing, transepts, and the remainder of the nave to form Middle St Giles' or the Old or Great Kirk. Edinburgh's ministers alternated freely between these churches until 1598, when the Privy Council of Scotland ordered the following division of Edinburgh into four parishes, each with two ministers:

- North East: Trinity College Kirk
- South East: Old (or Great) St Giles'
- South West: Upper Tolbooth (St Giles')
- North West: New (or East or Little) St Giles'

In 1620, the South West congregation moved to the newly built Greyfriars Kirk; the Upper Tolbooth partition remained unoccupied until 1634. In 1625, the Privy Council ordered the following rearrangement of these divisions; it is not, however, clear whether this was ever enforced:

- North East: Trinity College Kirk
- South East: East (or New) St Giles'
- South West: Greyfriars Kirk
- North West: Great (or Old) St Giles'

In 1633, St Giles' became a cathedral and the partition between the Old and New Kirks was removed, the South East congregation moved to Upper Tolbooth, then occupied the Old Kirk between 1639 and 1647, when it moved to the Tron Kirk; during this period, the Old Kirk congregation occupied Parliament Hall. In 1641, a division of Edinburgh into six parishes was made; the following parishes were allocated to St Giles':

- North: New (or High or East) St Giles'
- North West: Tolbooth (or West) St Giles'
- South: Old (or Middle) St Giles' (Note: The other three divisions were: North East: Trinity College Kirk; South West: Greyfriars Kirk; South East: Tron Kirk)

In 1699, the congregation of the New North Meeting House on the Lawnmarket occupied the northern half of the Tolbooth partition, after which it was named "Haddo's Hole Kirk". The Tolbooth Kirk vacated St Giles' in 1843; the Old Kirk was suppressed in 1860 and the Haddo's Hole congregation – by then known as West St Giles' – vacated St Giles' in 1881 to allow the removal of the internal partitions. (Note: West St Giles' first moved to a tin tabernacle on Bruntsfield Links then, in 1883, to a new church on Meadow Place, Marchmont, facing onto the Meadows. In 1972, the church united with the Grange and Warrender congregations to become Marchmont St Giles', based on Kilgraston Road in the Grange.) Since 1883, the High Kirk congregation has occupied the entire church.

== Cultural depictions ==
"They had nearly all been in St Giles' with its tattered blood-stained banners of the past. Sandy had not been there, and did not want to go. The outsides of old Edinburgh churches frightened her, they were of such dark stone, like presences almost the colour of the Castle rock, and were built so warningly with their upraised fingers."

— Muriel Spark, The Prime of Miss Jean Brodie (1961)

The real-life escape of condemned smuggler, George Robertson, from the Tolbooth Kirk during divine service in 1736 is fictionalised in The Heart of Midlothian by Walter Scott (1818).

St Giles' is referenced twice in The Prime of Miss Jean Brodie by Muriel Spark (1961): first as a location the title character and her "set" of pupils pass by on a walk around Edinburgh and again as one of the "emblems of a dark and terrible salvation" contemplated by the protagonist, Sandy Stranger.

In Disorderly Knights (1966), the fourth book of Dorothy Dunnett's Lymond Chronicles series, the protagonist, Sir Francis Crawford of Lymond, swears an oath in the Lauder Aisle of St Giles' and duels with Sir Graham Reid Malett on the steps of the church's high altar.

In Avengers: Infinity War (2018), St Giles' features as one of the locations of a fight between the heroes and Thanos' Black Order. The scenes were filmed around the cathedral in spring 2017.

== See also ==
- List of Category A listed buildings in the Old Town, Edinburgh
- List of Church of Scotland parishes
- St Mary's Cathedral, Edinburgh
- Holyrood Abbey – burial site of many Scottish monarchs

== Bibliography ==
- Blair, Robin et al. (2009). The Thistle Chapel: Within St Giles' Cathedral, Edinburgh. The Order of the Thistle. ISBN 978-0-9562407-0-5.
  - Burnett, Charles J.
    - "Genesis of the Chapel".
    - "Changes & Additions to the Chapel".
- Burleigh, John Henderson Seaforth (1960). A Church History of Scotland. Oxford University Press.
- Catford, E.F. (1975). Edinburgh: The Story of a City. Hutchinson. ISBN 978-0-0912-3850-6.
- Coltart, J.S. (1936). Scottish Church Architecture. The Sheldon Press.
- Dunlop, A. Ian (1988). The Kirks of Edinburgh: 1560–1984. Scottish Record Society. ISBN 0-902054-10-4.
- Farmer, David Hugh (1978). Oxford Dictionary of Saints (Fifth ed. revised). Oxford University Press. ISBN 019860629X.
- Fawcett, Richard.
  - (1994). Scottish Architecture: From the Accession of the Stewarts to the Reformation. Edinburgh University Press. ISBN 978-0-7486-0465-4.
  - (2002). Scottish Medieval Churches: Architecture & Furnishings. Arcadia Publishing. ISBN 978-0-7524-2527-6.
- Gifford, John; McWilliam, Colin; Walker, David (1984). The Buildings of Scotland: Edinburgh. Penguin Books. ISBN 0-14-071068-X.
- Gordon, Esmé (1959). St Giles' Cathedral and the Chapel of the Thistle, Edinburgh. Pillans & Wilson Ltd.
- Gray, William Forbes (1940). Historic Edinburgh Churches. The Moray Press.
- Hannah, Ian (1934). The Story of Scotland in Stone. Oliver & Boyd.
- Harris, Stuart (1996). The Place Names of Edinburgh: Their Origins and History. Gordon Wright Publishing. ISBN 978-0-9030-6583-2.
- Hay, George (1978). "The late medieval development of the High Kirk of St Giles, Edinburgh" (PDF). Proceedings of the Society of Antiquaries of Scotland. 107: 242–260. doi:10.9750/PSAS.107.242.260. S2CID 160019255.
- Hume, John (2005). Scotland's Best Churches. Edinburgh University Press. ISBN 978-1-4744-6936-4.
- Kallus, Veronika (2009). St Giles' Cathedral: Guide Book. Jarrold Publishing. ISBN 0851014666.
- Lees, James Cameron (1889). St Giles', Edinburgh: Church, College, and Cathedral: from the Earliest Times to the Present Day. W. & R. Chambers.
- MacGibbon, David and Ross, Thomas (1896). The Ecclesiastical Architecture of Scotland: From the Earliest Christian Times to the Seventeenth Century. David Douglas.
- McIlwain, John (1994) St Giles' Cathedral. Pitkin Guides. ISBN 978-0-8537-2629-6.
- Marshall, Rosalind K.
  - (2009). St Giles': The Dramatic Story of a Great Church and its People. Saint Andrew Press. ISBN 978-0-7152-0883-0.
  - (2011). A Guide to the Memorials in St. Giles' Cathedral, Edinburgh. The Choir Press.
- Maxwell, William D. (1955). A History of Worship in the Church of Scotland. Oxford University Press.
- Steele, Alan (1993). The Kirk of the Greyfriars, Edinburgh. Society of Friends of the Kirk of the Greyfriars. ISBN 0-9521115-0-0.
- Stevenson, Robert Louis (1879). Edinburgh: Picturesque Notes. Seeley, Jackson, and Halliday.
- Royal Commission on the Ancient and Historical Monuments of Scotland (1951). An Inventory of the Ancient and Historical Monuments of the City of Edinburgh with the Thirteenth Report of the Commission. His Majesty's Stationery Office.
- Scott, Hew (1915). Fasti ecclesiae scoticanae; the succession of ministers in the Church of Scotland from the reformation. Vol. 1. Edinburgh: Oliver and Boyd.
- Spark, Muriel (1961). The Prime of Miss Jean Brodie. Macmillan.

Preceded by Old Tolbooth	Home of the Parliament of Scotland; 1563–1639	Succeeded by Parliament House
