= Timeline of the Wars of the Three Kingdoms =

Civil wars in England, Ireland, and Scotland (1639–1651)

This is a timeline of events leading up to, culminating in, and resulting from the Wars of the Three Kingdoms.

== 1620s ==
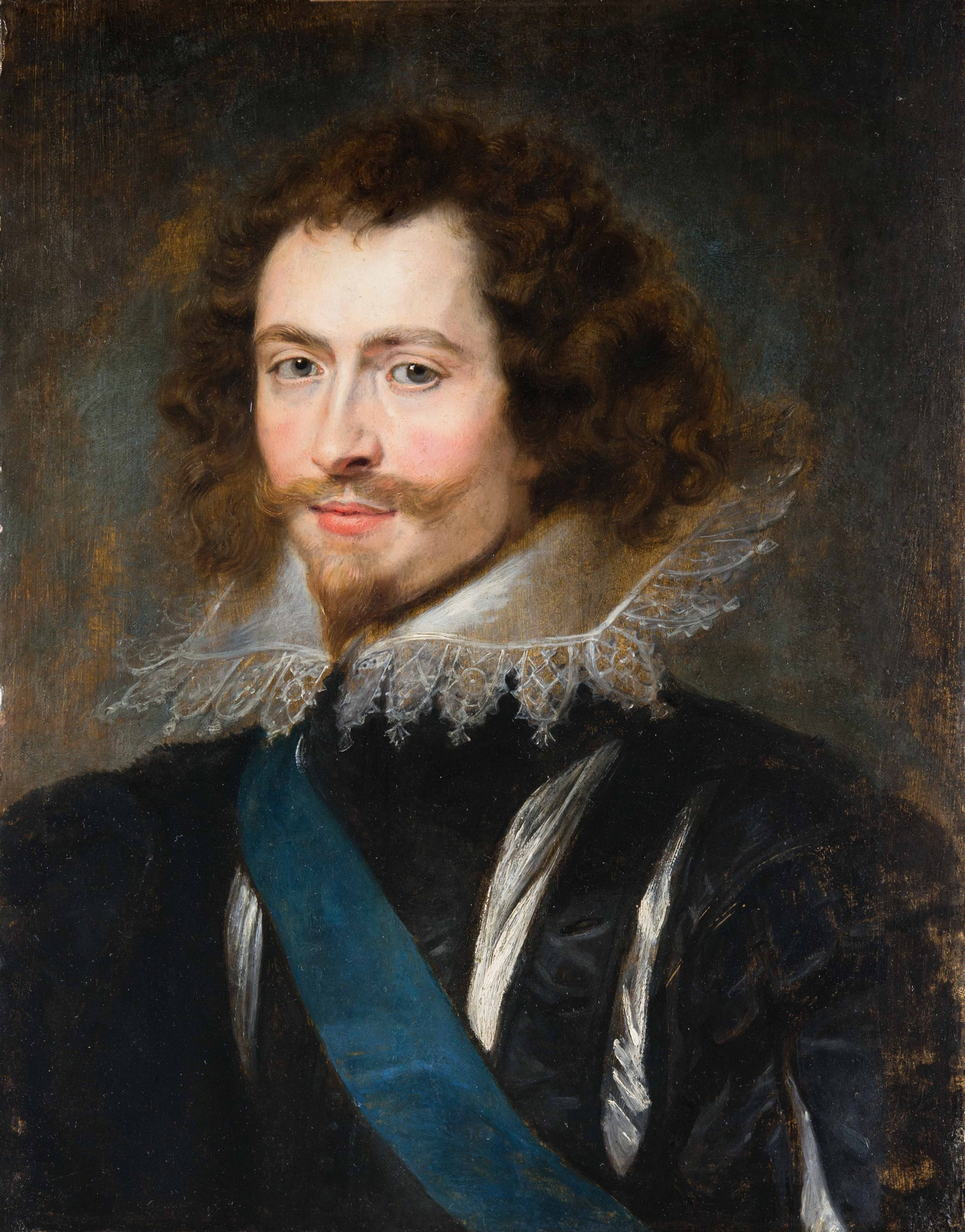
Parliament continually opposed the King and attempted to impeach one of his favourites, the Duke of Buckingham in 1626.

=== 1625 ===
- 27 March: After the death of his father, King James VI and I, King Charles I accedes to the throne.
- 13 June: Charles marries Henrietta Maria, a French catholic princess, which is unpopular due to her religion.
- 8 June–12 August: Charles' first parliament, which gets dubbed the Useless Parliament, is held. Parliament aims to limit the power of the King by only granting him the right to collect tonnage and poundage duties for one year, rather than for life as had been customary.
- October: In order to raise funds, Charles issues the Act of Revocation in Scotland, revoking all gifts of royal or church land made to the nobility.

=== 1626 ===
- 6 February–15 June: Charles' second parliament sits, but rather than discuss the financial matters Charles wanted, parliament sought to impeach one of the King's favourites, the Duke of Buckingham, causing Charles to dissolve parliament.
- October: Charles attempts to bypass parliament by raising funds through a 'forced loan', demanding money from taxpayers to finance war against Spain.

=== 1628 ===
- 17 March: Charles' third parliament convenes.
- 7 June: The King signs the Petition of Right, legislation forced on him by parliament banning non-parliamentary taxation and imprisonment.

=== 1629 ===
- 2 March: The Speaker attempts to adjourn parliament as directed by the King, but is held in his chair while parliament passed motions condemning non-parliamentary taxation, and opposing any change to religious practices. The King is so frustrated that he dissolves parliament on 10 March and resolves to rule without them, beginning the period of Personal Rule.

== 1630s ==
- 1637: Charles I attempts to impose Anglican services on the Presbyterian Church of Scotland, Jenny Geddes starts riots
- 1638: Signing of the National Covenant in Scotland
- 1639: First Bishops' War - conflict between Covenanters and Royalists in Scotland, beginning with the Covenanters seizing the city of Aberdeen in February. In June, English and Scottish armies muster on the border near Berwick but both demobilise without a battle after a truce is negotiated.

== 1640s ==
- 1640: Charles recalls the English Parliament in order to obtain money to finance his military struggle with Scotland. Parliament agrees to fund Charles, but only on condition he answer their grievances relating to his 11-year personal rule. Charles refuses and dissolves the Parliament, now known as the Short Parliament, after only three weeks.
- 1640: The Second Bishops' War breaks out in August. Responding to Charles' attempt to raise an army against them, an army of Covenanters crosses the Tweed and overruns an English force at the Battle of Newburn (28 August), before occupying the city of Newcastle and other parts of northern England.
- 1640: The Treaty of Ripon (26 October) is agreed which leaves the Scots in indefinite occupation of north-east England, while receiving daily payments from England, until a final settlement is negotiated. Charles has no option but to recall Parliament to raise the necessary funds. Parliament convenes in November and remains convened, in one form or another, until 1660, thus earning the name of the Long Parliament.
- 1641: Charles signs the Treaty of London (10 August), formally ending the Bishops' Wars. The Scots army departs northern England.
- 1641: 23 October, Irish Rebellion breaks out in Ulster, with violence marked by the massacre of Protestants by Catholics. The rebels win a battle against Crown forces at Julianstown Bridge near Drogheda in December.
- 1641: 1 December, Parliament issues the Grand Remonstrance to Charles. Charles refuses to address the grievances it raises.
- 1642: The Covenanters send a Protestant Scots army to Ulster to defend the Protestant plantations

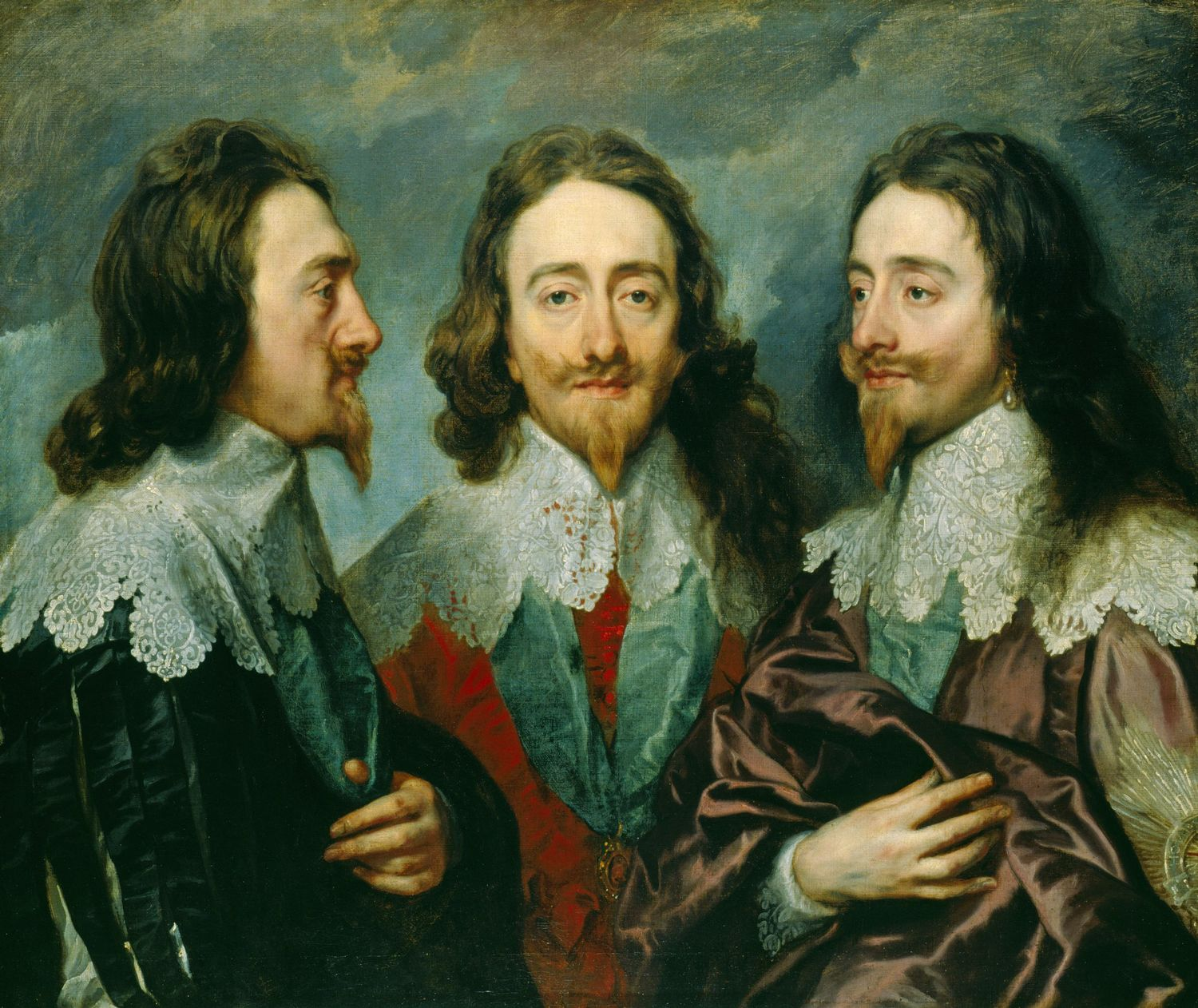
"Charles I, King of England, from Three Angles" by Anthony van Dyck

- 1642: Backed by armed troops, Charles enters the House of Commons to arrest the five members whom he accused of treason. The news causes uproar in London, and Charles flees the capital in fear of his life. In his absence, Parliament passes the Militia Bill which, in effect, seizes control of the London arsenal and places the Trained bands and militia under its authority. Charles retaliates by appointing individuals to take control of other regional militias in the King's name. From this moment both sides actively raise troops and gather munitions.
- 1642–1646: The First English Civil War
- 1642: An alliance of Irish Catholics; Gaelic Irish and the Old English forms the Catholic Confederation, based at Kilkenny, meeting first in March 1642.
- 1642: 23 October: the Battle of Edgehill, the inconclusive first battle in the English Civil War
- 1643: Ceasefire between the English Royalists and Irish Confederates declared
- 1643: 25 September: an alliance between the English Parliament and the Scottish Covenanters — the Solemn League and Covenant — declared. Scottish troops march into England to support the English Parliamentarians
- 1644: 2 July: the Battle of Marston Moor, a major defeat of the royalists by the Parliamentarians and Scots
- 1644: Scottish Civil War started by the Scottish Royalist Montrose, with the aid of Irish Confederate troops under Alasdair MacColla, including the Scots-Irish forces serving under Manus O'Cahan
- 1645: the English Parliament forms the New Model Army
- 1645: 14 June: the Battle of Naseby: the New Model Army crushes the Royalist army, effectively ending the First English Civil War
- 1645: 15 August, Montrose wins Royalist control of Scotland at the Battle of Kilsyth; subsequently Covenanter armies returned from England defeat him at the Battle of Philiphaugh (13 September 1645)
- 1646: May: Charles I surrenders to Scots Covenanters, who hand him over to the English Parliament
- 1646: 5 June: in the battle of Benburb, an Irish Confederate army under Owen Roe O'Neill defeats the Scottish Covenanter army in Ulster
- 1647: in the Battle of Dungans Hill (August) and the Battle of Knocknanauss (November) English Parliamentarian forces smash the Irish Confederate armies of Leinster and Munster respectively
- 1648–1649: The Second English Civil War
- 1648–1649: Ormonde Peace — formal alliance between Irish Confederates and English Royalists declared, causing a split among the Confederates and some allying with Cromwellian forces
- 1648: the Battle of Preston (August): Scottish Covenanter (Engagers faction) army invades England to restore Charles I; defeated by the Parliamentarians
- 1649: 30 January: Execution of Charles I by the English Parliament
- 1649: Feb 5: The Parliament of Scotland proclaims Charles II as King of Britain.
- 1649: 2 August: in the battle of Rathmines, Parliamentarians rout an Irish-Royalist force outside Dublin; 15 August, New Model Army lands in Ireland — begins Cromwellian conquest of Ireland.
- 1649: 11 September: Cromwell takes Drogheda; followed by Wexford on 11 October

== 1650s ==
- 1650: Montrose tries to launch a Royalist uprising in Scotland; the Covenanters defeat, arrest and execute him
- 1650: Charles II takes the oath in support of the Solemn League and Covenant and repudiates his alliance with the Irish Confederates. (The Scots subsequently crown him at Scone on New Year's Day, 1651.)
- 1650: Anglo-Scottish War breaks out between the Scots and the English Parliament. Cromwell invades Scotland and smashes the Scottish army at the Battle of Dunbar (3 September 1650)
- 1651: Henry Ireton besieges Limerick
- 1651: June: Capture of the Isles of Scilly by Admiral Robert Blake
- 1651: 3 September: the defeat of Charles II and the Scots at Worcester ends the Anglo-Scottish War. Charles II goes into exile in France
- 1652: Surrender of the last Irish stronghold in Galway — guerrilla warfare continues
- 1653: Surrender of the last organised Irish troops in Cavan.
- 1654: The end of the Royalist rising of 1651 to 1654 in Scotland
- 1655: March: Penruddock uprising in southwest England
- 1658: 3 September: Oliver Cromwell dies. Succeeded as Lord Protector by his son Richard.
- 1659: August: Booth's Uprising along Welsh border

== 1660s ==
- 1660: 25 May: Charles II lands at Dover. The Restoration of England, Scotland, Ireland, and the English colonies commences.
- 1661: 1–4 January: Venner's Uprising in London

== Bibliography ==
- Gaunt, Peter (1997). The British Wars 1637–1651. London: Routledge. ISBN 0-415-12966-4.
- Fritze, Ronald; Robison, William, eds. (1996). Historical Dictionary of Stuart England, 1603–1689. Westport, Connecticut: Greenwood Press. ISBN 0-313-28391-5.
