= Treaty of Ripon =

1640 treaty ceasing hostilities

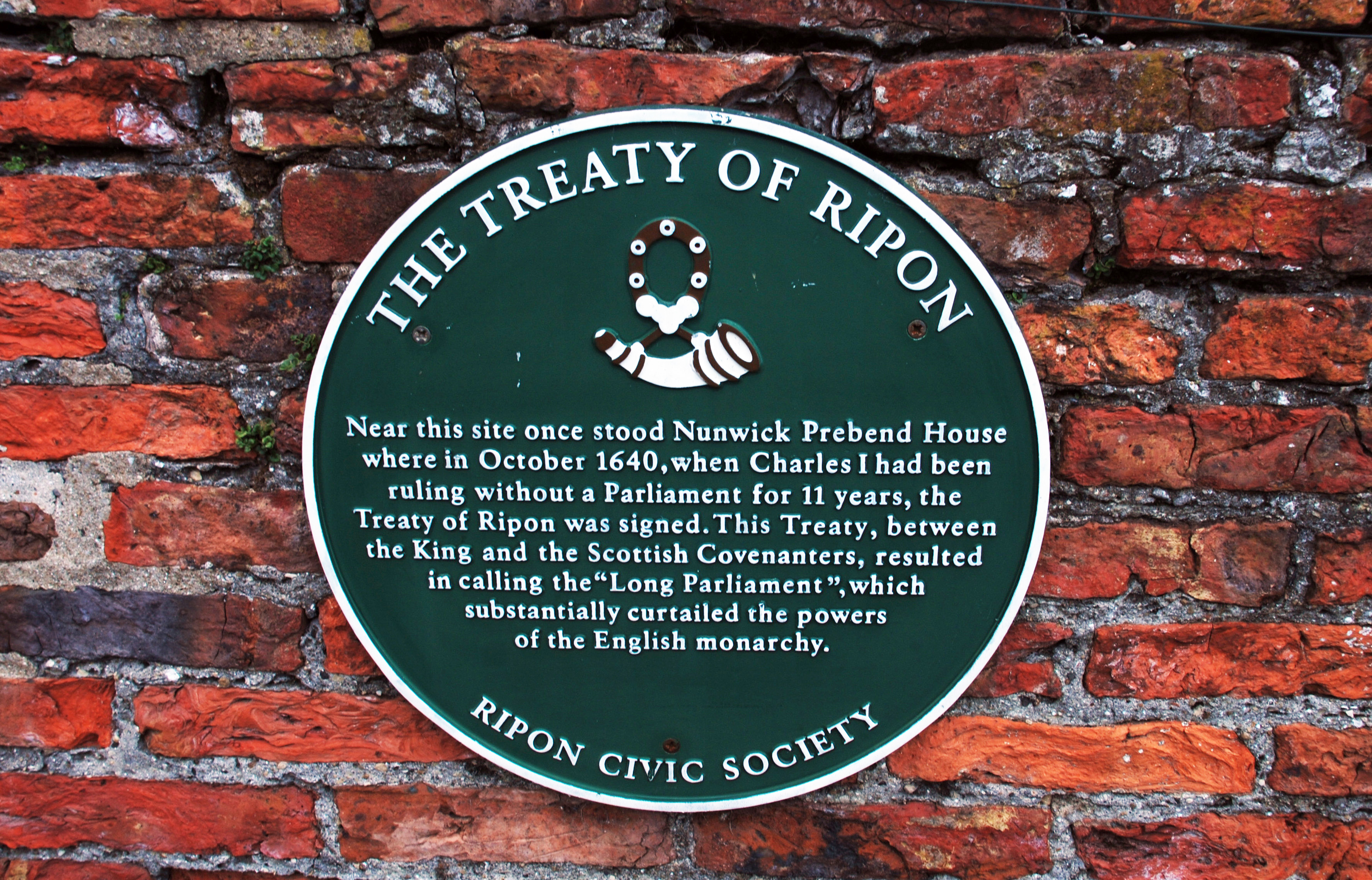
- Plaque commemorating the signing of the treaty
- Context: Bishops' Wars
- Drafted: 16 October 1640
- Signed: 28 October 1640
- Location: Ripon
- Negotiators: (England) Great Council of Peers; (Scotland) Covenanters
- Original signatories: Charles I
- Parties: Kingdom of England; Kingdom of Scotland

The Treaty of Ripon was a truce between Charles I, King of England, and the Covenanters, a Scottish political movement, which brought a cessation of hostilities to the Second Bishops' War.

The Covenanter movement had arisen in opposition to attempts by Charles, who was also King of Scotland, to reform the Church of Scotland to bring it into closer alignment with the Church of England. In 1638, the Covenanters gained political supremacy in Scotland and the next year Charles mobilised to restore his authority over Scotland by force. A confrontation between Scots and English armies was avoided when a truce was negotiated in June 1639, ending what would later be known as the First Bishops' War. However, this did not resolve fundamental issues and the political struggle continued into the next year. To gain the funds for a second military action against the Scots, Charles called a new English parliament—the first in 11 years. When this assembled in April 1640, the parliament would not agree to supply funds for his renewed war effort unless he first addressed various long-standing grievances. Unwilling to do so, Charles dissolved what became known as the Short Parliament after only three weeks and again prepared for war using his own resources.

In August 1640, a Scots Covenanter army invaded England, won a decisive victory at the Battle of Newburn and proceeded to occupy Northumberland, County Durham, and Newcastle upon Tyne. Charles assembled the Great Council of Peers to negotiate with the Scots. The two sides met in Ripon near York where the Scots agreed to a cessation of hostilities provided they were paid daily expenses indefinitely until a final settlement could be negotiated and ratified by a new English parliament.

Over the next year, further negotiations in London led eventually to a formal peace treaty ending the Bishops' Wars. Meanwhile, the Long Parliament, as it became known, was strongly opposed to the King and his government and passed a series of acts which meant Charles could no longer dissolve it at will. Antagonism between the King and the Parliament escalated to armed conflict in 1642: the start of the English Civil War.

== Background ==
=== National Covenant ===
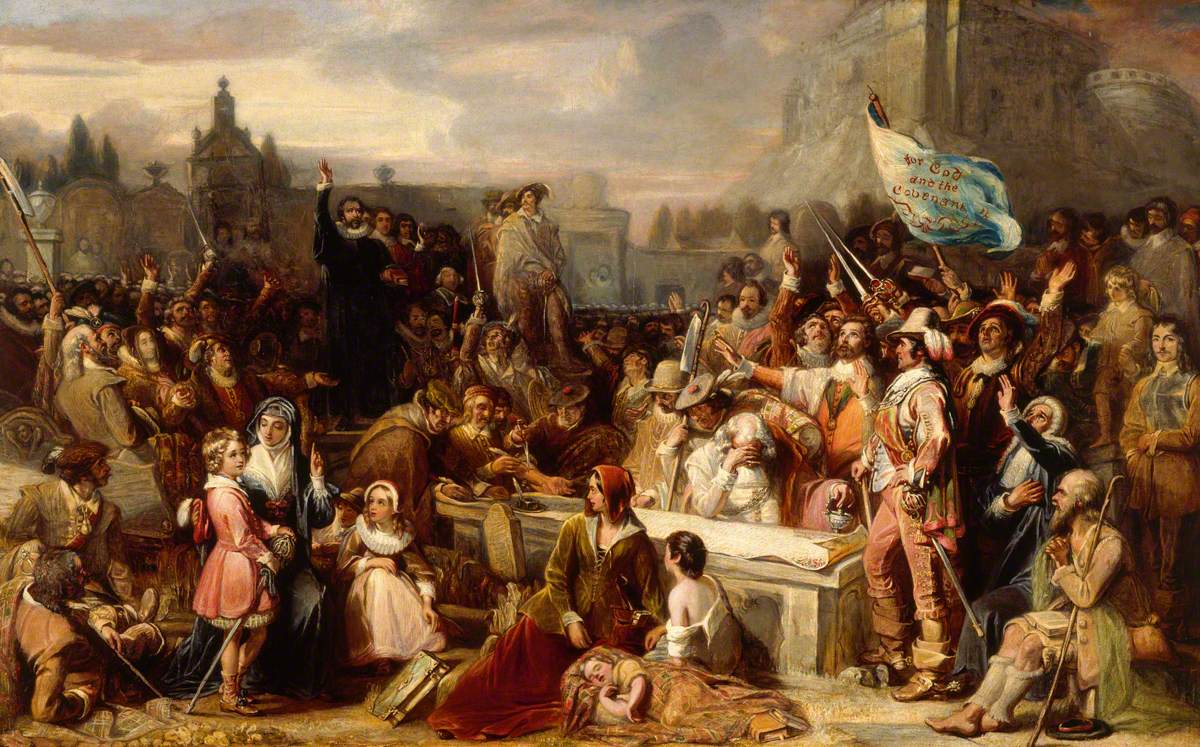
Signing of the National Covenant in Greyfriars Kirkyard, Edinburgh

The Protestant Reformation created a Church of Scotland, or 'kirk', Presbyterian in structure, and Calvinist in doctrine. While 'Presbyterian' and 'Episcopalian' now implies differences in both governance and doctrine, this was not the case in the 17th century. Episcopalian structures were governed by bishops, usually appointed by the monarch, Presbyterian by presbyters, elected by ministers and elders. Arguments over the role of bishops were as much about politics and the power of the monarch as religious practice.

When James VI and I succeeded as king of England in 1603, he viewed a unified Church of Scotland and England as the first step in creating a centralised, Unionist state. This policy was adopted by his son, Charles I, but the two were very different in doctrine, while English Puritans also objected to proposed reforms to the Church of England.

In 1636, a new Book of Canons replaced John Knox's Book of Discipline and excommunicated anyone who denied the King's supremacy in church matters. Charles failed to consult either the kirk or the Scottish Parliament, and these reforms caused outrage in Scotland. When followed in 1637 by a new Book of Common Prayer, it resulted in riots, and in February 1638, representatives from all sections of Scottish society agreed a National Covenant, pledging resistance to liturgical 'innovations.' It tapped into widespread dissatisfaction with the policies advocated by a largely absentee monarch, and the loss of Scottish political influence to England. The Covenant was supported by most of the nobility, including the Marquess of Argyll and six other members of the Scottish Privy Council.

Although Charles agreed to defer discussion of the new canons to the General Assembly of the Church of Scotland, he made it clear he had no intention of making any concessions. When the Assembly gathered in Glasgow in December it rejected the changes, expelled bishops from the kirk, and affirmed its right to meet annually, not just when the king agreed. The Marquis of Hamilton advised Charles there was now no alternative to war. With the Scottish Parliament recruiting soldiers and seeking support from foreign governments and English Puritans, Charles decided to treat this as an act of rebellion and responded by gathering an army to march on Scotland.

=== Bishops' Wars ===
In March 1639, Covenanter forces seized Edinburgh and other Scottish towns, starting the First Bishops' War, which ended without a battle in June by the Treaty of Berwick. Following this, Charles called the Short Parliament in April 1640, seeking funds for a second campaign; when Parliament refused to approve taxes until he had agreed to address other issues, it was dissolved after only three weeks, ahead of a debate likely to result in a petition against the war in Scotland. Instead, Charles turned to the Parliament of Ireland for funds, and planned another invasion of Scotland supported by an army from Ireland, a naval blockade of the Forth, and an uprising in the Highlands.

The success of the Covenanters in asserting the rights of Parliament in Scotland emboldened Charles' English opponents, led by John Pym, who began secret talks with the Scots. Seeking to limit royal authority in England, this group represented a much broader body of dissenters who had been alienated by Charles' policies during his over a decade-long period of Personal Rule. With this invitation, and warned about the king's plans by allies from within the English parliament, the Covenanters launched an invasion of England, bypassing the heavily defended city of Berwick, starting the Second Bishops' War. At the Battle of Newburn, 28 August 1640, the English army was routed by Scottish forces who then captured Newcastle two days later before continuing their advance south, occupying Durham and establishing an advanced line on the River Tees on 18 September.

== Negotiations ==
With Newcastle, along with most of Northumberland and Durham, under the control of the Covenanters, Charles called a meeting of the Great Council of Peers in York, the first time this body had met for a century. The Council declined to assume the functions of Parliament, but did negotiate the treaty with the Covenanters.

Meanwhile, the Scottish army was facing shortages of supply and started collecting moneys from the nearby shires and church properties, as well as from Newcastle itself in order to pay for the continued upkeep of the army. This shortage of supplies did confer a negotiating advantage to the Covenanters though. With incidents of pillaging by soldiers already being reported, the English lords did not want to see the army become a mob living in the area of Newcastle, but Charles could not afford to pay the invaders' demands without the tax-raising powers of Parliament, making a settlement involving both king and Parliament inevitable. In collaboration with the king's opponents the Covenanters also refused to withdraw until Charles summoned the English Parliament.

== Terms ==
Map showing territorial implications of the treaty. In light blue is territory occupied by Scotland following the treaty.

Under the terms of the treaty the Scots continued to occupy parts of Northumberland and Durham (Mainly Newcastle), and were to receive expenses of £850 a day starting from 16 October paid from England, but agreed to a temporary cessation of hostilities. This situation was to continue until a full settlement was agreed. The Scottish Government was also to be reimbursed for its expenses in the war.

Though humiliating for Charles, he was desperate to stop the Covenanters from taking York and, with little support from his peers, his options were limited, and he was compelled to agree terms.

Terms were finalised on 16 October, and accepted by Charles on the 28th. Negotiations on the permanent settlement would continue for another 10 months until August 1641, when the Treaty of London was signed.

== Aftermath ==
Charles issued writs for what became known as the Long Parliament, which assembled on 3 November 1640. Since the Scots made it clear they would only return home once paid, and would only agree terms with Parliament, Charles was now faced with a body that he could not dissolve at will. During this time the Covenanters used their army's continued presence in England to strengthen the position of the king's English opponents.

Over the next few months, Parliament voted to ensure it could not be dissolved without its own consent, imprisoned Archbishop Laud, and executed the Earl of Strafford. Only then did it agree the Treaty of London on 10 August 1641, which agreed to pay the Scots £300,000 to cover the costs of the war. The Covenanters' army then returned to Scotland, where most of it was disbanded.

Disputes between Charles and Parliament continued to escalate, culminating in the attempted arrest of the Five Members in January 1642. Charles left London and began rallying support for his cause; the First English Civil War began on 22 August 1642.

== See also ==
- 1640 in England
- Outline of the wars of the Three Kingdoms
- Scottish invasions of England
- Timeline of the English Civil War
- Wars of the Three Kingdoms

== Sources ==
- Arnold-Baker, Charles (2001). "The Companion to British History". The Companion to British History, Routledge (2 ed.). Great Council or Magnum Concilium: Routledge. ISBN 0415185831.
- Bannerman, James (1868b). The church of Christ: a treatise on the nature, powers, ordinances, discipline, and government of the Christian church. Vol. 2. Edinburgh: T. T. Clark.
- BBC (19 September 2014). "The National Covenant & Civil War". www.bbc.co.uk. BBC.
- Britannica. "Short Parliament". Encyclopedia Britannica. Encyclopædia Britannica, Inc.
- Cust, Richard (2015). "The Collapse of Royal Power in England, 1637–1642". In Braddick, Michael J. (ed.). The Oxford Handbook of the English Revolution. OUP Oxford. ISBN 978-0-19-166727-5.
- Gericke, Bradley T (2001). Civil Wars in Britain; 1640–1646 (PDF) (PhD). U.S. Army Command and General Staff College. Archived (PDF) from the original on 9 March 2014.
- Goodare, Julian (2015). "The Rise of the Covenanters, 1637–1644". In Braddick, Michael J. (ed.). The Oxford Handbook of the English Revolution. OUP Oxford. ISBN 978-0-19-166727-5.
- Harris, Tim (2014). Rebellion: Britain's First Stuart Kings, 1567–1642. OUP. ISBN 978-0199209002.
- Healey, Jonathan (12 July 2018). "What sparked the Civil War?". HistoryExtra. Immediate Media Company Ltd.
- "Why was there a civil war in England in 1642?". The Hutchinson Unabridged Encyclopedia with Atlas and Weather Guide. Helicon. 2018a.
- Helicon (2018b). "Bishops' Wars". The Hutchinson Unabridged Encyclopedia with Atlas and Weather Guide. Bishops' Wars: Helicon. Archived from the original on 9 October 2020 – via Credo Reference.
- HistoryExtra (2012). "Britain's civil wars: the 15 key moments". HistoryExtra. Immediate Media Company Ltd.
- Kishlansky, Mark A.; Morrill, John (4 October 2008). "Charles I (1600–1649)". Oxford Dictionary of National Biography (online ed.). Oxford University Press. doi:10.1093/ref:odnb/5143. (Subscription, Wikipedia Library access or UK public library membership required.)
- Lockyer, Roger (2009). "Bishops' wars". The Oxford Companion to British History. Oxford University Press. doi:10.1093/acref/9780199567638.001.0001. ISBN 9780199567638.
- Mackie, JD; Lenman, Bruce; Parker, Geoffrey (1986). A History of Scotland. Hippocrene Books. ISBN 978-0880290401.
- Mason, Roger A. (2007). "National Covenant and Solemn League and Covenant". The Oxford Companion to Scottish History. Oxford University Press. doi:10.1093/acref/9780199234820.001.0001. ISBN 9780199234820.
- Matthews, Rupert (2003). England Versus Scotland: Great British Battles. Newburn: Leo Cooper. ISBN 978-0850529494.
- McDonald, Alan (1998). The Jacobean Kirk, 1567–1625: Sovereignty, Polity and Liturgy. Routledge. ISBN 185928373X.
- OpenLearn (7 January 2001). "Timeline 1640". OpenLearn. The Open University.
- Plant, David (14 December 2006). "The Scottish National Covenant". bcw-project.org. BCW Project.
- Plant, David (24 November 2010). "The Treaty of London, 1641". bcw-project.org. BCW Project.
- Plant, David (3 November 2012). "Crisis in Scotland, 1638–1641". bcw-project.org. BCW Project.
- Stephen, Jeffrey (2010). "Scottish Nationalism and Stuart Unionism". Journal of British Studies. 49 (1, Scottish Special). doi:10.1086/644534. S2CID 144730991.
- Stevenson, David (1973). Scottish Revolution, 1637–44: Triumph of the Covenanters (2003 ed.). David & Charles. ISBN 0715363026.
