= Outline of the wars of the Three Kingdoms =

Civil wars in England, Ireland, and Scotland (1639–1651)

The following outline is provided as an overview of and topical guide to the wars of the Three Kingdoms:

Wars of the Three Kingdoms – A series of interconnected conflicts within the kingdoms of England, Ireland and Scotland which took place from 1639-1651.

== Background ==
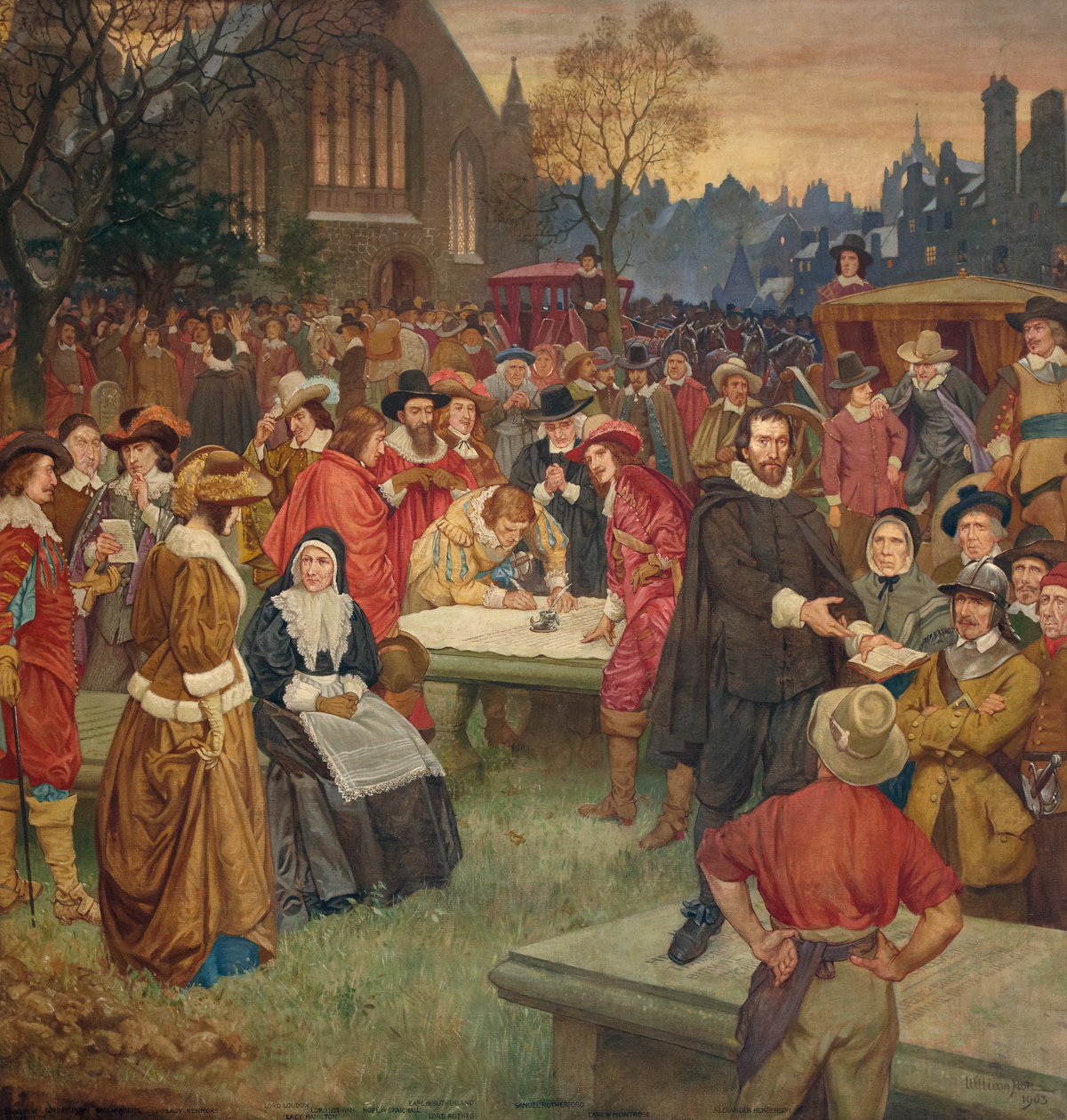
The Signing of the National Covenant in Greyfriars Churchyard, 1638, a painting by William Hole from 1903

Incidents which can be seen as leading to the wars of the Three Kingdoms:

- Personal Rule – The period of 1629–1640 where King Charles I ruled without recourse to Parliament.
- Jenny Geddes starts riot in Edinburgh – Incident in 1637 starting protests over the use of the Book of Common Prayer by the Church of Scotland.
- Signing of the National Covenant – 1638 declaration to defend the Church of Scotland from the reforms of King Charles I

== Participants ==
The wars of the Three Kingdoms was fought between combatants of the following forces:

- Royalists - Forces in all three kingdoms loyal to Charles I of England and his son Charles II of England.
- Covenanters - Scottish Presbyterians organised by the Church of Scotland.
- Confederate Ireland - For a period from 1642-1649 this faction achieved self rule, and was allied to the Royalists.
- Parliamentarians - Fought with the goal of giving Parliament supreme executive power.

== Governing bodies ==
The following bodies were all involved in governing one of the participating groups.

- Long Parliament - Parliament of England sitting from 1640-1660
- Committee of Estates - Governed Scotland
- Oxford Parliament (1644) - Formed by Charles I as part the Royalist war effort.

== Main conflicts ==
The wars of the Three Kingdoms included the following conflicts:

- Bishops' Wars - Conflicts in 1639 and 1640 over the governance of the Church of Scotland.
- Irish Confederate Wars - Conflict in Ireland from 1641-1653.
  - Irish Rebellion of 1641 - Rebellion by Irish Catholics.
  - Cromwellian conquest of Ireland - Conquest of Ireland led by Oliver Cromwell from 1649-1653.
- English Civil Wars - Series of conflicts over the rule of England which included combatants from Scotland and Ireland as well.
  - First English Civil War - 1642-1646.
  - Second English Civil War - 1648.
  - Third English Civil War - 1649-1651.

== Notable events ==
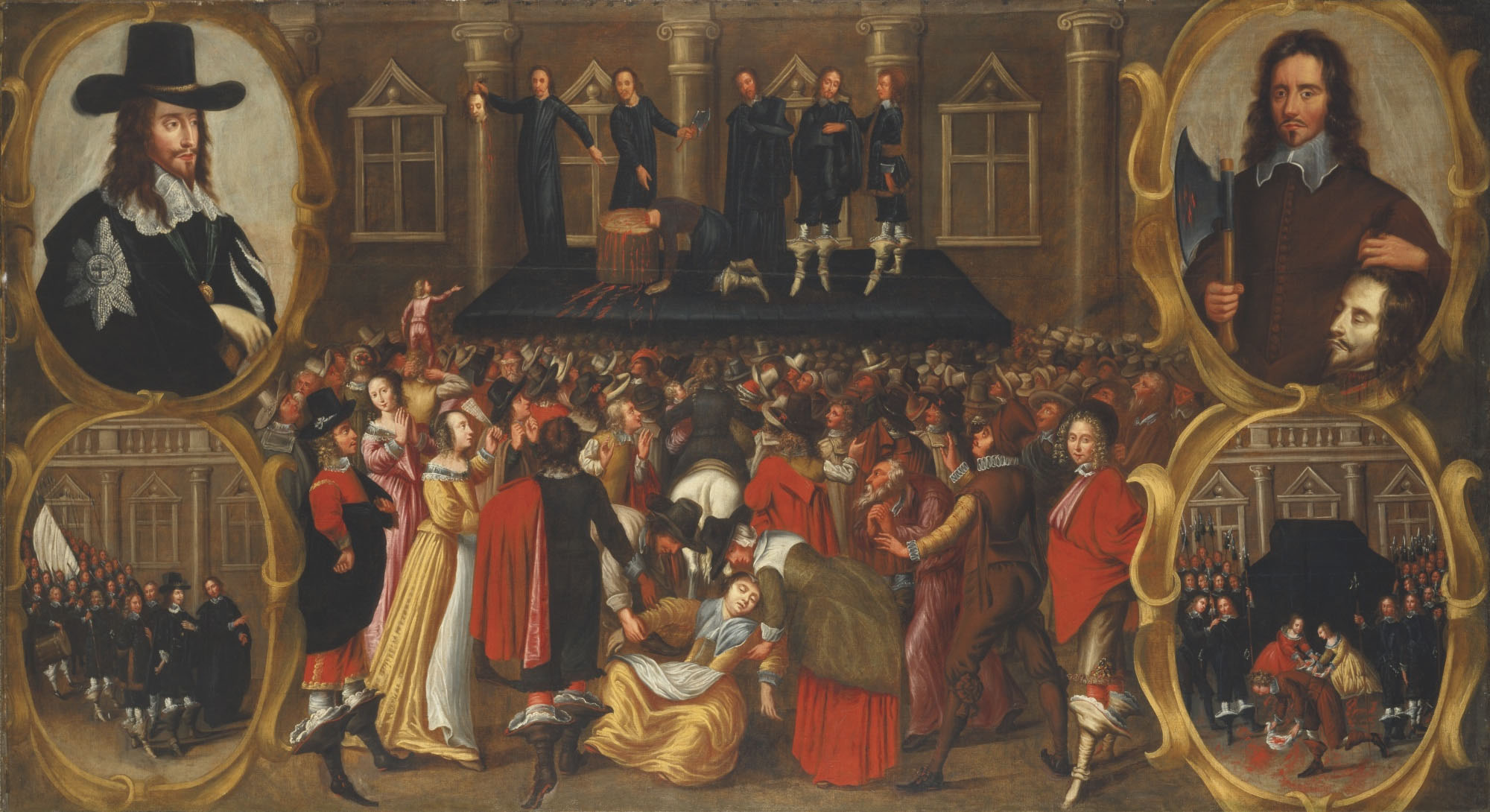
Anonymous Dutch painting of the execution of Charles I, 1649.

The following non-military events were connected to the wars of the Three Kingdoms.

- Short Parliament - Sat for three weeks in 1640, before being dissolved by Charles.
- Treaty of Ripon - 1640 agreement ceding Northumberland and County Durham to Scottish Covenanter forces, forcing King Charles I to recall Parliament.
- Grand Remonstrance - List of grievances presented by Parliament to King Charles I in 1641.
- Solemn League and Covenant - 1643 agreement between Scottish Covenanters and English Parliamentarians.
- Execution of Charles I - Occurred in 1649.

== Notable individuals ==
=== Political leaders ===
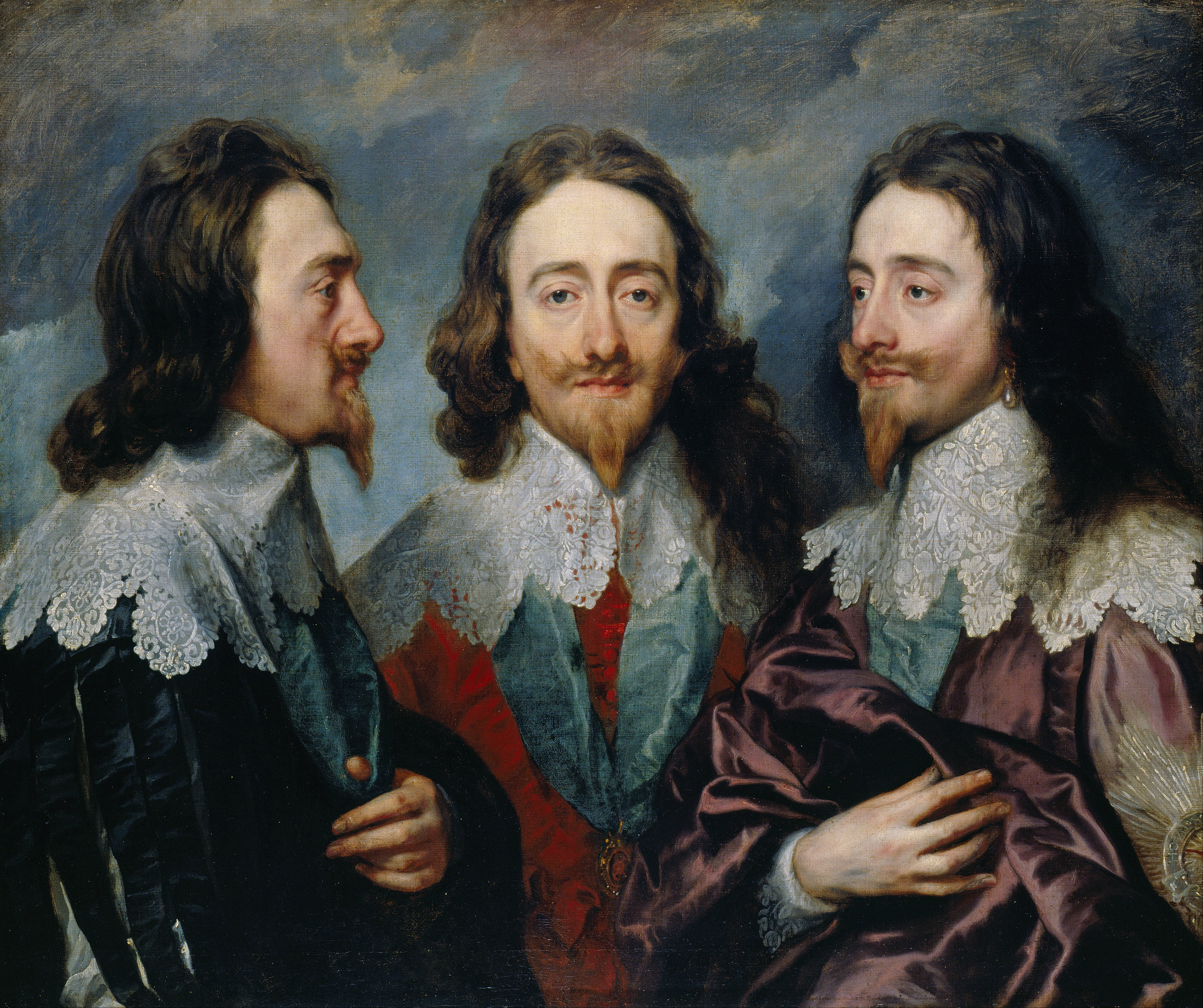
Charles I in Three Positions by Anthony van Dyck, 1635–1636

- King Charles I - Ruler of the Three Kingdoms from 1625 to 1649.
- King Charles II - King of Scotland from 1649 to 1651 and then ruler of all three kingdoms from 1660.
- John Pym - Leader of Parliamentary opposition to the King.
- Archibald Campbell, 1st Marquess of Argyll - De facto head of the Scottish government throughout most of the period.

=== Military leaders ===
- Oliver Cromwell - General in the Parliamentarian army.
- Thomas Fairfax - Commander-in-Chief of the Parliamentarian army.
- Alexander Leslie, 1st Earl of Leven - Covenanter commander.
- James Graham, 1st Marquess of Montrose - Fought initially for the Scottish Covenanters, before later fighting for King Charles I as the English Civil War developed.
- Prince Rupert of the Rhine - Royalist commander.

=== Others ===
- Jenny Geddes - Incited riot thought to have led to the Bishops' Wars

== Events outside the Three Kingdoms ==
Prior to and during the wars of the Three Kingdoms, the Kingdom of England held dominion over a number of colonies and protectorates. The wars spread to these areas as well.

- Channel Islands in the Wars of the Three Kingdoms
- English overseas possessions in the Wars of the Three Kingdoms

== Aftermath ==
Flag of the Commonwealth

The wars of the Three Kingdoms resulted in the following situations:

- Commonwealth of England - Created in 1649 following the execution of Charles I of England.
- Interregnum (1649–1660) - Ended when Charles II of England ascended to the throne.

== See also ==
- European wars of religion
- Thirty Years' War
- Timeline of the Wars of the Three Kingdoms
