= Scottish invasions of England =

Scottish invasions of England occurred several times over a period of centuries. This is a list of notable invasions.

== List of invasions ==
List of invasions
Date	Details
1061–1091	Scottish invasions of England, undertaken by King Malcolm III of Scotland who invaded England four times. Malcolm III was killed at the Battle of Alnwick in 1093.
1138	King David I of Scotland invaded England in support of his niece Matilda's claim to the English throne against that of King Stephen. The Scots were defeated at the Battle of the Standard, sometimes called the Battle of Northallerton. Despite this defeat the Scots occupied northern England until 1157.
1215	Alexander II led an army into the Kingdom of England in support of the English barons in their struggle against King John of England, sacking Berwick-upon-Tweed. The Scottish forces then reached the south coast of England at the port of Dover where in September 1216, Alexander paid homage to the pretender Louis VIII of France, chosen by the barons to replace King John.
1322	Scottish invasion of England during the Great Raid of 1322, resulting in the Battle of Old Byland, part of the First War of Scottish Independence.
1327	Scottish invasion of England with Weardale campaign, culminating with the Battle of Stanhope Park, part of the First War of Scottish Independence.
1346	Scottish invasion of England, undertaken by King David II of Scotland who is routed at the Battle of Neville's Cross at Neville's Cross, Durham, part of the Second War of Scottish Independence. David II is captured by the English.
1513	Scottish invasion of England, undertaken by King James IV of Scotland who is defeated at the Battle of Flodden near Branxton, Northumberland. James IV dies on the battlefield.
1640	Scottish Covenanter forces invade England as part of the Second Bishops' War and are victorious at the Battle of Newburn, leading to a truce and the 1641 Treaty of London.
1644	Scottish Covenanter forces under the Earl of Leven invade Northumberland as part of the First English Civil War.
1648	Scottish forces (the Engagers) under the Duke of Hamilton invade England, culminating in their defeat at the Battle of Preston (1648).
1651	Scottish forces under David Leslie with Charles Stuart (Charles II of England) invade England, ending in their defeat at the Battle of Worcester on 3 September 1651.
1745	Jacobite forces invade England during the Jacobite rising of 1745.

== See also ==
- English invasions of Scotland
