= English invasions of Scotland =

List of notable invasion of Scotland by England

English invasions of Scotland occurred on numerous occasions over the centuries. This is a list of notable invasions.

== 10th century ==
- 934 - Æthelstan's invasion of Scotland

== 13th century ==
- 1296 - English invasion of Scotland (1296), undertaken by King Edward I of England, event that initiated the First War of Scottish Independence.
- 1298 - English invasion of Scotland (1298), undertaken by King Edward I of England, to retaliate against the defeat of an English army at the Battle of Stirling Bridge to conquer Scotland.
- 1300 - English invasion of Scotland (1300), undertaken by King Edward I of England, to continue to attempt the conquest from the 1298 invasion and in reaction to the Scots recapture of Stirling Castle in 1299.

== 14th century ==
- 1301 - English invasion of Scotland, undertaken by King Edward I of England, aiming to conquer Scotland in a two-pronged attack along the eastern and western coasts.
- 1303 - English invasion of Scotland, undertaken by King Edward I of England after the failure of the 1301 invasion, another two-pronged attack along the eastern and western coasts to conquer Scotland.
- 1304 - English invasion of Scotland, undertaken by King Edward I of England who remained at war there for two years with battles across the entire land.
- 1306 - English invasion of Scotland, undertaken by an English army under the command of Aymer de Valence, Earl of Pembroke in retaliation of the murder of John Comyn, Lord of Badenoch and the crowning of King Robert I of Scotland; remaining in Scotland for the summer and autumn.
- 1307 - Proposed English invasion of Scotland, undertaken by King Edward I that, however, did not proceed after Edward I died while on his way north.
- 1310 - English invasion of Scotland, undertaken by King Edward II of England where he remained refurbishing English-held castles until midsummer 1311.
- 1314 - English invasion of Scotland which ended in English defeat at the Battle of Bannockburn.
- 1319 - English invasion of Scotland, undertaken by King Edward II of England who laid siege to Berwick but withdrew in response to a Scottish incursion into England.
- 1322 - English invasion of Scotland that turned back in response to Scottish incursion into England.
- 1332 - English invasion of Scotland led by Edward Balliol and Henry Beaumont. The Scots are defeated at the Battle of Dupplin Moor and Balliol is crowned Scottish king.
- 1333 - English invasion of Scotland, undertaken by King Edward III of England as part of the Second War of Scottish Independence.
- 1338 - English invasion of Scotland under William Montagu, 1st Earl of Salisbury.
- 1356 - English invasion of Scotland, undertaken by King Edward III of England and known as Burnt Candlemas.
- 1385 - English invasion of Scotland (1385), undertaken by King Richard II of England.
- 1400 - English invasion of Scotland (1400), undertaken by King Henry IV of England.

== 15th century ==
- 1482 - English invasion of Scotland (1482) under Richard, Duke of Gloucester.

== 16th century ==
- 1544 - English invasion of Scotland led by Edward Seymour, 1st Earl of Hertford and John Dudley, 2nd Earl of Warwick, burning the city of Edinburgh at the command of Henry VIII of England.
- 1548 - English invasion of Scotland led to the occupation of much of southern Scotland, known as the Rough Wooing.

== 17th century ==
- 1650 - English invasion of Scotland (1650) led by Oliver Cromwell, followed by the Royalist invasion of England, and the absorption of Scotland into the Commonwealth of England.

== See also ==
- Scottish invasions of England
