= Battle of Newburn =

Battle of the Second Bishops' War

- Part of the Bishops' Wars
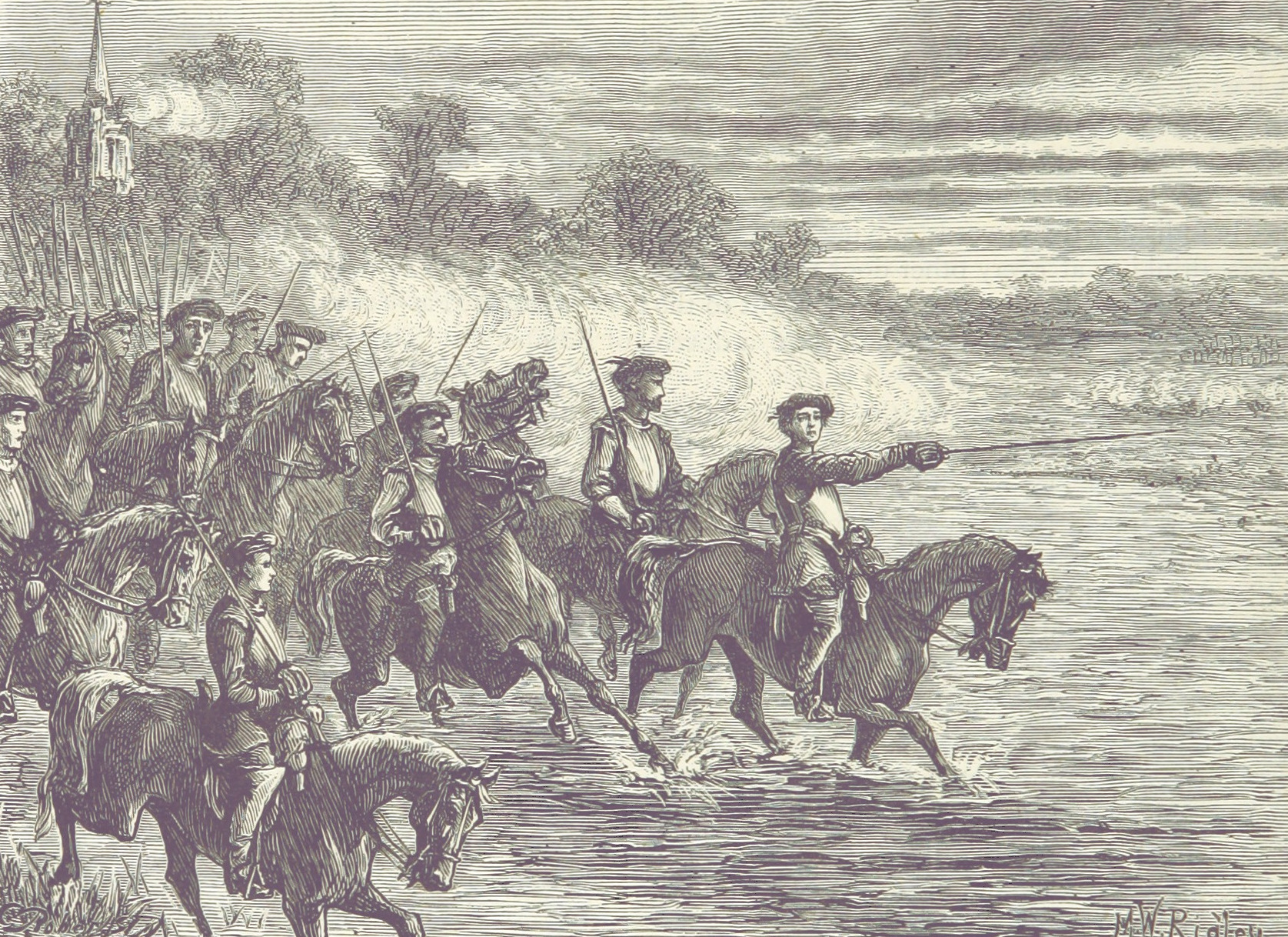
- Covenanter cavalry fording the River Tyne during the battle
Date	28 August 1640
Location	Newburn, Tyne and Wear 54°59′00″N 01°45′05″W
Result	Covenanter victory

Belligerents
Covenanters	England

Commanders and leaders
Alexander Leslie; Alexander Hamilton; Montrose	Viscount Conway; Sir Jacob Astley; Lord Rochester (POW); Thomas Lunsford

Strength
20,000	5,000

Casualties and losses
300 killed or wounded	300 killed or wounded

The Battle of Newburn, (Note: Also known as the Battle of Newburn Ford) 28 August 1640, was the decisive action of the Second Bishops' War. Fought near Newburn in northern England, a Covenanter army under Alexander Leslie defeated a smaller English force led by Viscount Conway.

Victory enabled the Scots to take Newcastle upon Tyne, which provided the bulk of London's coal supplies, and allowed them to put pressure on Charles I of England. The October 1640 Treaty of Ripon required him to recall Parliament to ratify the peace settlement. He did so in November 1640, a key element in the events leading to the outbreak of the First English Civil War in August 1642.

== Background ==
The Protestant Reformation created a Church of Scotland, or 'kirk', Presbyterian in structure, and Calvinist in doctrine. Presbyterian churches were ruled by Elders, nominated by congregations; Episcopalian were governed by bishops, appointed by the monarch. In 1584, bishops were imposed on the kirk against considerable resistance; since they also sat in Parliament and usually supported Royal policies, arguments over their role were as much about politics as religion.

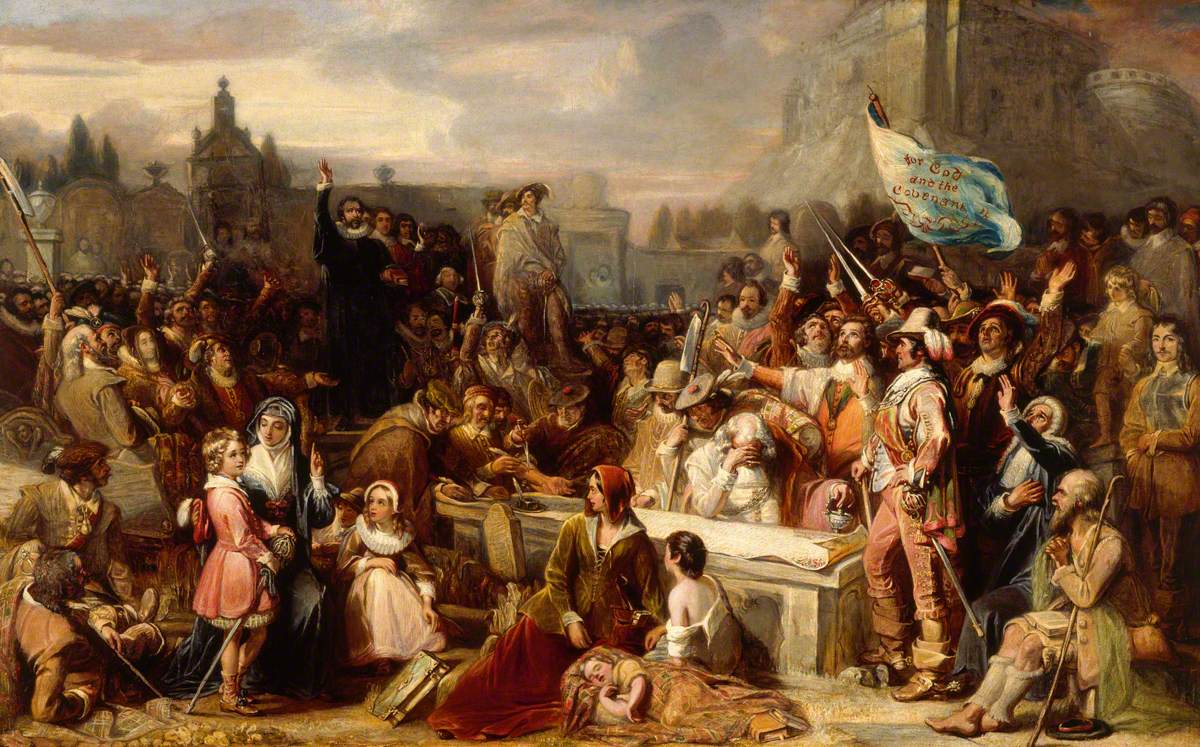
Signing of the National Covenant in Edinburgh

The Protestant Reformation created a Church of Scotland, or 'kirk', Presbyterian in structure, and Calvinist in doctrine. Presbyterian churches were ruled by Elders, nominated by congregations, while traditional Episcopalian churches were governed by bishops, appointed by the monarch. In 1584, bishops were imposed on the kirk, and since they also sat in Parliament where they usually supported Royal policy, arguments over their role were as much about politics as religion.

As in England, the vast majority of Scots, whether Covenanter or Royalist, believed monarchy was divinely mandated, but disagreed on who held ultimate authority in religion. In general, Scottish Royalists held this resided with the king, but there were many factors determining choice of sides, including nationalist allegiance to the kirk. Montrose fought for the Covenant in 1639 and 1640, then became a Royalist, and switching sides was common throughout the period.

When James VI and I succeeded as king of England in 1603, he viewed a unified Church of Scotland and England as the first step in creating a centralised, Unionist state. However, the two churches were very different in doctrine, while even Scottish bishops objected to many Church of England practices. Opposition to religious reforms imposed by Charles I led to the National Covenant on 28 February 1638, whose signatories vowed to oppose any changes. These included Argyll and six other members of the Privy Council of Scotlandl, and in December, bishops were expelled from the kirk.

The Newburn campaign, 1640

Charles resorted to military action to assert his authority, resulting in the First Bishops' War in 1639. His chief Scottish advisor James Hamilton, 1st Duke of Hamilton proposed an ambitious three part strategy, in which Scottish Royalists would be supported by additional troops from England and Ireland. However, Charles' suspension of the Parliament of England during the period of Personal Rule from 1629 to 1640 meant there was insufficient support or money to conduct such operations, which largely failed to materialise. This allowed the Covenanters to consolidate their domestic position by defeating Royalist forces in Aberdeenshire, while the chaotic state of the English army left them unable to mount any effective opposition.

While the two sides agreed the Treaty of Berwick in June, both saw it primarily as an opportunity to strengthen their position. In April 1640, Parliament was recalled for the first time in eleven years but when it refused to vote taxes without concessions, it was dissolved after only three weeks. Despite this, Charles went ahead, supported by his most capable advisor, the Earl of Strafford. As in 1639, he planned an ambitious three-part attack; an Irish army from the west, an amphibious landing in the north, supported by an English attack from the south.

Once again, the first two parts failed, while his English troops consisted largely of militia levied in the south, poorly-equipped, unpaid, and unenthusiastic about the war. On the march north, lack of supplies meant they looted the areas they passed through, creating widespread disorder; several units murdered officers suspected of being Catholics, before deserting. Lacking reliable troops, Lord Conway, commander in the north, assumed a defensive posture and focused on reinforcing Berwick-upon-Tweed, the usual starting point for invading England. On 17 August, cavalry units under Montrose crossed the River Tweed, followed by the rest of Leslie's army of around 20,000. The Scots bypassed the town, and headed for Newcastle-on-Tyne, centre of the coal trade with London, and a valuable bargaining point.

== Battle ==
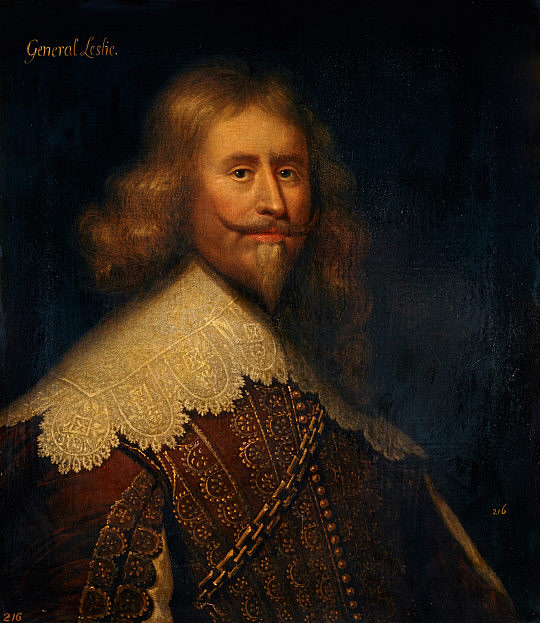
The Scottish commander, Alexander Leslie

Since Conway had insufficient men to adequately hold Newcastle and provide a large enough field army to confront Leslie, he left the town with a skeleton garrison and positioned most of his troops near Hexham, gambling on the Scots crossing the River Tyne there. By 27 August, the Scots were approaching Newcastle; supplying such a large army meant Leslie either had to capture it, or retreat. Given the strong defences north of the river, he decided to cross the Tyne at Newburn, then a small village six miles outside Newcastle, which would allow him to attack its weaker, southern side.

On the evening of 27 August, Conway arrived at Newburn with 1,000 cavalry and 2,000 infantry, who began building defences on the south bank of the Tyne, supervised by Colonel Thomas Lunsford. They were joined next morning by Sir Jacob Astley, with another 2,000 infantry, but in addition to being heavily outnumbered, their positions around the ford were almost indefensible. Leslie's artillery commander, Alexander Hamilton, was an extremely experienced soldier, who placed his guns on high ground to the north; this provided a clear field of fire on the English troops below, while making them almost impervious to return fire.

In addition, most of the English artillery was still at Hexham, leaving them only eight light guns with which to reply to the Scottish batteries. Sir Jacob, also a veteran of the Thirty Years' War, suggested neutralising this disadvantage by withdrawing into the woods further back, but this advice was rejected. While waiting for low tide, Leslie asked Conway to allow his army across to 'deliver a petition to the king', which was refused; Conway then received instructions from Strafford, ordering him to prevent a crossing of the ford. In retrospect, retreat might have been a better option; taking Newcastle would have taken time, and English prisoners later reported the Scots had only enough rations for three days.

The battle started around 13:00 when a Scots officer who came too close to the ford was shot, initiating an outbreak of musket fire. Around 300 Covenanter cavalry attempted to cross the river but came under concentrated fire from Lunsford's infantry and retreated. Hamilton's artillery now began an intense bombardment of the hastily prepared defences around the ford, which they soon dismantled; despite Lunsford's efforts to rally them, his troops abandoned their positions, allowing the Scots to cross. A counter-attack by the English cavalry was initially successful, but they were driven back, and their commander Henry Wilmot captured.

Since his cavalry and infantry withdrew in opposite directions, Conway was unable to reform his lines, and by early evening, the English were in full retreat towards Newcastle. One of the few members of the English army to emerge with any credit from the battle was George Monck, who managed to ensure their artillery escaped intact. Both sides suffered around 300 casualties, and Leslie ordered his troops to refrain from pursuit; already in secret contact with John Pym and the Parliamentary opposition, the Scots wanted to avoid making it harder to agree terms.

== Aftermath ==
Despite this victory, the Scots still had to take Newcastle, but to Leslie's surprise, when they arrived on 30 August, Conway had withdrawn to Durham. One suggestion is he did not trust his ill-disciplined and mutinous troops, but morale in the rest of the army now collapsed, forcing Charles to make peace. Under the October Treaty of Ripon, the Scots were paid £850 per day, and allowed to occupy Northumberland and County Durham pending final resolution of terms. Funding this required the recall of Parliament, and the Scots finally evacuated Northern England after the August 1641 Treaty of London.

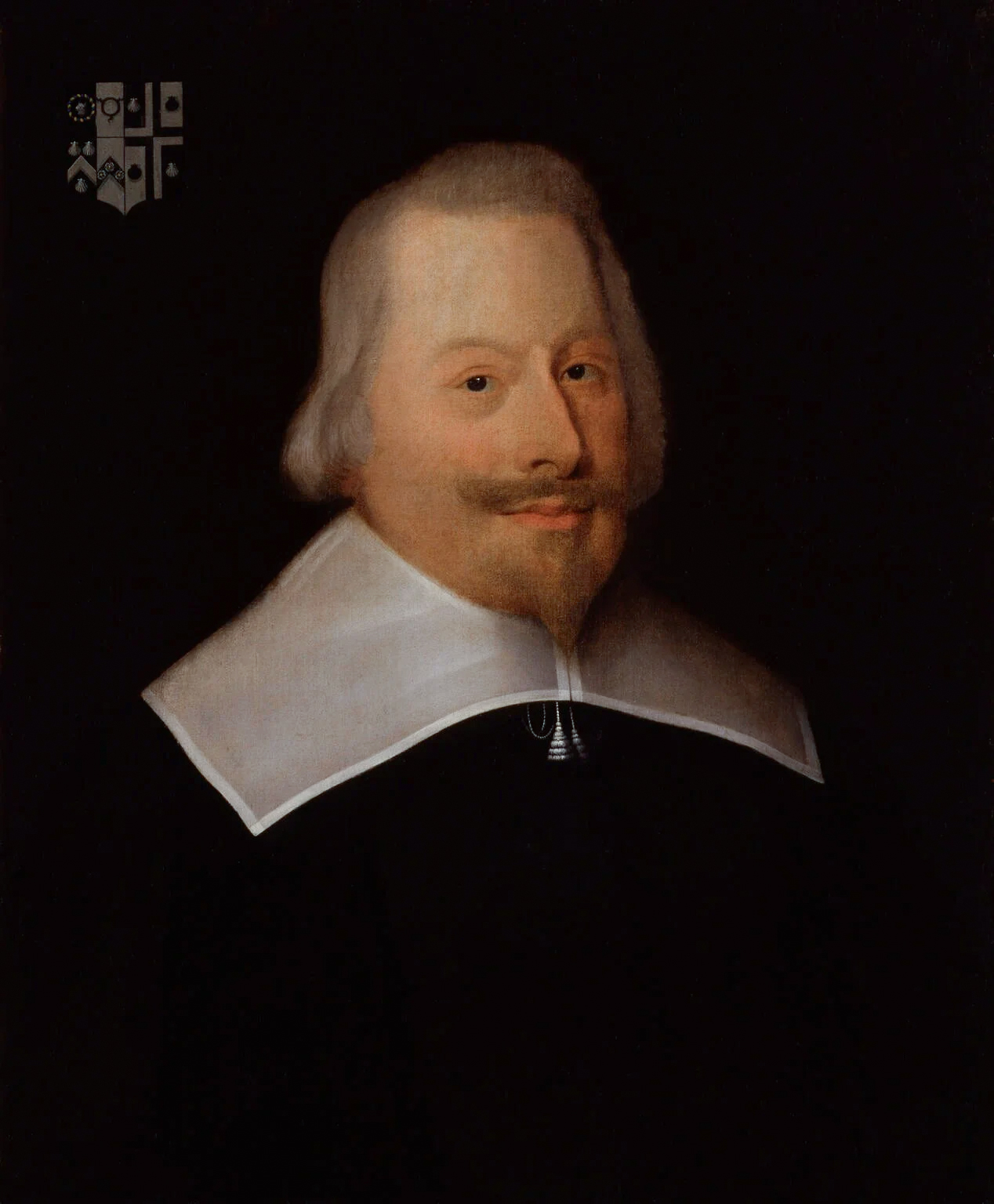
John Pym, leader of the English Parliamentary opposition; defeat forced Charles to recall Parliament in November 1640

While defeat forced Charles to call a Parliament he could not get rid of, the Irish Rebellion of 1641 was arguably more significant in the struggle that led to war in August 1642. Although both sides agreed on the need to suppress the revolt, neither trusted the other with control of the army raised to do so, and it was this tension that was the proximate cause of the First English Civil War.

Victory confirmed Covenanter control of government and kirk, and Scottish policy now focused on securing these achievements. The 1643 Solemn League and Covenant was driven by concern over the implications for Scotland if Parliament were defeated; like Charles, the Covenanters sought political power through the creation of a unified church of Scotland and England, only one that was Presbyterian, rather than Episcopalian.

However, ease of victory in the Bishops' Wars meant they overestimated their military capacity and ability to enforce this objective. Unlike Scotland, Presbyterians were a minority within the Church of England, while religious Independents opposed any state church, let alone one dictated by the Scots. One of the most prominent opponents was Oliver Cromwell, who claimed he would fight, rather than agree to such an outcome.

Many of the political radicals known as the Levellers, and much of the New Model Army, belonged to Independent congregations; by 1646, the Scots and their English allies viewed them as a greater threat than Charles. Defeat in the 1648 Second English Civil War resulted in his execution; failure to restore his son in the 1651 Third English Civil War was followed by Scotland's incorporation into the Commonwealth, a union made on English terms.

== Sources ==
- Fissell, Mark (1994). The Bishops' Wars; Charles I's Campaigns Against Scotland, 1638–1640. CUP. ISBN 978-0521466868.
- Harris, Tim (2014). Rebellion: Britain's First Stuart Kings, 1567–1642. OUP. ISBN 978-0199209002.
- Kaplan, Lawrence (1979). "Charles I's Flight to the Scots". Albion: A Quarterly Journal Concerned with British Studies. 11 (3): 207–223. doi:10.2307/4048612. JSTOR 4048612.
- "English Heritage Battlefield Report: Newburn Ford 1640". Historic England. 1995.
- Hutton, Ronald (2004). "Monck, George, first duke of Albemarle (1608–1670)". Oxford Dictionary of National Biography (online ed.). Oxford University Press. doi:10.1093/ref:odnb/18939. (Subscription, Wikipedia Library access or UK public library membership required.)
- Mackie, JD; Lenman, Bruce; Parker, Geoffrey (1986). A History of Scotland. Hippocrene Books. ISBN 978-0880290401.
- Main, David. "The Origins of the Scottish Episcopal Church". St Ninians Castle Douglas. Archived from the original on 7 April 2019.
- McDonald, Alan (1998). The Jacobean Kirk, 1567–1625: Sovereignty, Polity and Liturgy. Routledge. ISBN 185928373X.
- Rees, John (2016). The Leveller Revolution. Verso. ISBN 978-1784783907.
- Royle, Trevor (2004). Civil War: The Wars of the Three Kingdoms 1638–1660 (2006 ed.). Abacus. ISBN 978-0-349-11564-1.
- Stephen, Jeffrey (January 2010). "Scottish Nationalism and Stuart Unionism". Journal of British Studies. 49 (1, Scottish Special). doi:10.1086/644534. S2CID 144730991.
