= Treaty of London (1641) =

Treaty ending the Bishops' Wars between England and Scotland

- Context: Bishops' Wars
- Signed: 10 August 1641
- Location: London
- Parties: Kingdom of England; Kingdom of Scotland

The Treaty of London was an agreement signed between the Kingdom of England and the Kingdom of Scotland in 1641 which formally brought an end to the 1639 to 1640 Bishops' Wars.

Charles I was king of both countries but, since 1639, Scotland had been under the control of a political faction who opposed the king and were known as the Covenanters. In August 1640, a Covenanter army invaded and occupied parts of northern England. The Covenanters and Charles reached an interim truce in October in the Treaty of Ripon. This mandated that the English government pay for the ongoing Covenanter occupation pending further negotiations over a final settlement. Furthermore, Charles was required to summon a new parliament of England which assembled in November 1640.

After months of negotiations, on 10 August 1641 Charles signed a long-term peace treaty. Among other concessions, the terms included the abolition of bishops in the Church of Scotland, as well as the remittance of financial payments from England to Scotland. By the end of the month, all Covenanter forces had withdrawn from northern England.

The treaty restored peace between Scotland and England and resolved many of the issues which had led to the Bishops' Wars but the new English parliament was strongly opposed to Charles. Significantly, the Long Parliament, as it became known, was able to pass acts that meant it could only be dissolved by its own consent; previously, English monarchs had been able to dissolve Parliament at their will. In early 1642, a power struggle developed between Parliament and Charles which escalated to the outbreak of the First English Civil War.

== Background ==
In 1637, King Charles of England, Scotland and Ireland tried to impose a new Book of Common Prayer, based on that of the Church of England, on the Church of Scotland. The attempt aroused patriotic and religious outrage, and many Scots signed the National Covenant in protest, becoming known as Covenanters. Another grievance was that General Assemblies of the Church of Scotland had voted to abolish the office of bishop, and Charles seemed determined to reinstate it. Charles raised troops in England to invade Scotland and enforce his will.

On 28 August 1640, a Covenanter army that had invaded northern England defeated English forces at the battle of Newburn in Northumberland. On 26 October, Charles and the Covenanters signed the Treaty of Ripon as a preliminary to a more detailed and permanent treaty. Meanwhile, the Covenanter army was to be allowed to occupy Northumberland and County Durham, and was to be paid £850 per day for its upkeep. Further, the Covenanters were promised that they would be reimbursed for the expenses they had incurred because of the wars.

Charles was desperately short of money, and summoned the Parliament of England in the hope that they would pass financial supply bills to solve his problem. The Parliament, which sat until 1660 and became known as the Long Parliament, first met on 3 November, and turned out be not at all subservient to his wishes. A week later, Covenanter commissioners John Smith of Grothill and Hugh Kennedy of Ayr arrived in London to finalise a treaty. Charles denounced the Covenanter army as rebel invaders, but the commissioners were welcomed by the Puritans of London, and he withdrew his remarks.

== Negotiations and terms ==
Scottish and English commissioners continued negotiations into the middle of 1641. The King was in a weak position: there was civil unrest in London, and Parliament had impeached his two chief ministers, Lord Strafford and William Laud, who were eventually executed. He therefore made several unexpected concessions. The resolutions of the General Assemblies of the Church of Scotland which abolished the office of bishop were ratified. The royal castles at Edinburgh and Dumbarton were to be used for defensive purposes only. No Scot would be censured or persecuted for signing the National Covenant. The Scottish "incendiaries" considered responsible for precipitating the crisis would be prosecuted in Scotland. Scottish goods and ships captured during the war would be returned.

Publications against the Covenanters would be suppressed. It was also agreed that the Scots would be paid £300,000, a sum which Parliament characterised as "brotherly assistance". The Scottish commissioners too were keen to conclude negotiations, feeling that they had outstayed their welcome. They had denounced the presence of bishops in the Church of England, and had spoken and written against Strafford and Laud, which their hosts had told them was none of their business. They dropped their demand that Presbyterianism be adopted in England and Ireland, and the treaty was signed on 10 August 1641.

== Aftermath ==
Charles visited Scotland from August to November, giving out favours. However, the underlying tensions within his kingdoms still remained, and the Bishops' Wars turned out to be only the initial conflicts in the Wars of the Three Kingdoms.
