= Treaty of Berwick (1639) =

Peace treaty between England and Scotland

- Type: Truce
- Context: Scottish Covenanters and the Kingdom of England end the First Bishops' War
- Signed: 18 June 1639
- Location: Berwick, England

The Treaty of Berwick (also known as the Peace of Berwick or the Pacification of Berwick) was an agreement between the Kingdom of England and the Kingdom of Scotland, signed on 18 June 1639, which ended the First Bishops' War.

Peace lasted less than a year before the outbreak of the Second Bishops' War in 1640.

== War ==
During the 1630s, King Charles I, who was king of both Scotland and England, had attempted religious reforms to the Church of Scotland. In 1638, to express their strong political opposition to these reforms, many people throughout Scotland signed the National Covenant. Supporters of this movement, known as Covenanters, gained political supremacy in Scotland and mobilised forces to oppose any attempt by the King, or any of his Royalist supporters in Scotland, to restore his authority.

By June 1638, inconclusive skirmishing had taken place in the north-east of Scotland between Covenanters and Royalists. At the same time, Scottish and English armies had mustered on either side of their mutual border, near the town of Berwick.

== Negotiations and Terms ==
Both sides had reasons to fear a battle and on 6 June, the King sent a page to the Scots army camp near Duns to propose talks. Negotiations formally began when a delegation of Scottish noblemen arrived at the King's camp near Berwick on 11 June. After a week of discussions, where Charles was an active participant, a treaty was concluded on 18 June. The Scots agreed to demobilise, free Royalist prisoners and restore royal property. Charles agreed, in turn, to withdraw English forces and, in order to resolve all disputed matters, he would call a General Assembly of the Church of Scotland in August, followed by a Scottish Parliament to ratify its decisions.

== Aftermath ==
Though both armies withdrew without a battle, the treaty had avoided any mention of the disputed issue of episcopacy, that is, whether the King could accept the Covenanters prior expulsion of bishops from the Church of Scotland and who had ultimate authority. The General Assembly which followed in August reaffirmed Covenanter policies and the Covenanter-dominated parliament which assembled afterwards passed acts ratifying these. Furthermore, the Parliament also refused to be dissolved by the King's representative. On hearing reports from Scotland, Charles was determined to continue the political struggle by force if necessary:

I will rather die than yield to their impertinant and damnable demands

The treaty was rendered moot when conflict again broke out in the Second Bishops' War the following summer.

== Sources ==
- Woolrych, Austin (2009). Britain in revolution: 1625 - 1660. Oxford Univ. Press. ISBN 978-0-19-927268-6.
- Royle, Trevor (2010). Civil War: the wars of the three kingdoms; 1638-1660 (Paperback ed., Repr ed.). London: Abacus. ISBN 978-0-349-11564-1.
- "Historical Collections: 1639-40, January-March (2 of 2)". British History Online. 1721. - see 'His Majesty's Declaration' and 'Articles agreed upon'

== See also ==
- Wars of the Three Kingdoms
- List of treaties
