= Wars of the Three Kingdoms =

British civil wars, 1639–1653

- Part of the European wars of religion
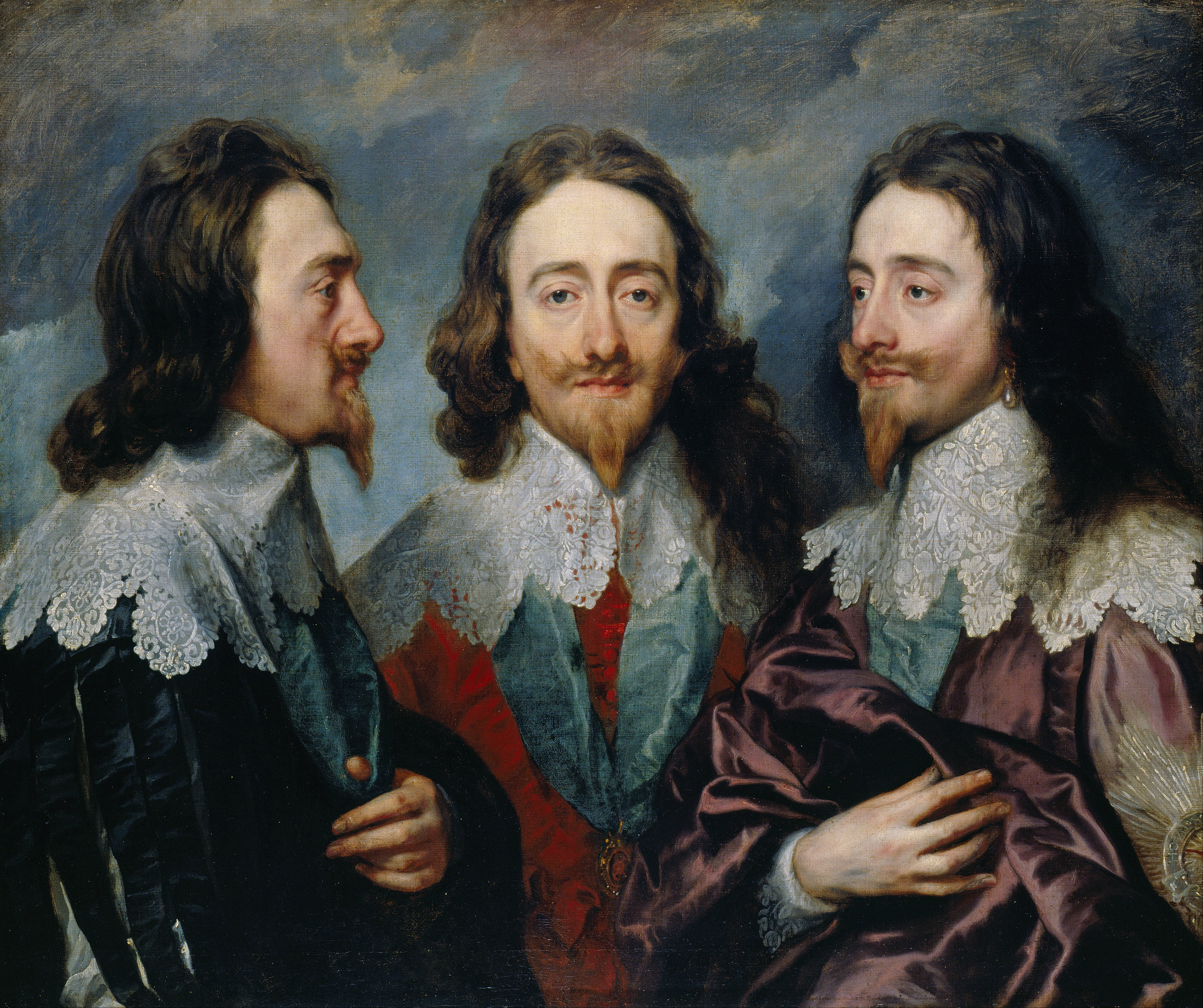
- Charles I by Anthony van Dyck, painted 1635–1636
Date	1639–1653
Location	British Isles (Kingdoms of England, Scotland, and Ireland)
Result	Parliamentarian victory; monarchy abolished, Commonwealth of England established
Territorial changes	England/Wales, Scotland, and Ireland become a unitary state under the Commonwealth of England, Scotland and Ireland

Belligerents
Royalists	Covenanters	Confederates	(Kingdom of England) Parliamentarians

Commanders and leaders
Charles I (executed); Prince Rupert; Charles II; Marquis of Montrose (executed) (in Scotland); Marquis of Ormond (in Ireland)	Marquis of Argyll; Alexander Leslie; David Leslie; Robert Monro (in Ireland)	Confederate Supreme Council, Owen Roe O'Neill (in Ulster); Thomas Preston (in Leinster); Garret Barry (in Munster); John Burke (in Connacht); Edmund O'Dwyer (in Munster)	Earl of Essex; Earl of Manchester; Thomas Fairfax; Oliver Cromwell; George Monck (in Scotland); Michael Jones (in Ireland); Henry Ireton (in Ireland)

Casualties and losses
50,700 English and Welsh killed in combat	27,895 Scottish killed in combat	Unknown	34,130 English and Welsh killed in combat
- +127,000 non-combat English and Welsh deaths (including 40,000 civilians) (Note: "While it is notoriously difficult to determine the number of casualties in any war, it has been estimated that the conflict in England and Wales claimed about 85,000 lives in combat, with a further 127,000 noncombat deaths (including some 40,000 civilians).")

The Wars of the Three Kingdoms (Note: The term Wars of the Three Kingdoms reflects recent publications' tendency to name these linked conflicts with the term represents a trend by modern historians aiming to take a unified overview rather than treating some of the conflicts as mere background to the English Civil War. Some, such as Carlton and Gaunt, have labelled them the British Civil Wars.) is the collective term for a series of conflicts fought between 1639 and 1653 in England, Scotland, and Ireland, then separate entities in a personal union under Charles I. They include the 1639 to 1640 Bishops' Wars, the First and Second English Civil Wars, the Irish Confederate Wars, the Cromwellian conquest of Ireland, and the Anglo-Scottish War of 1650–1652. They resulted in the execution of Charles I, the abolition of monarchy, and founding of the Commonwealth of England, a unitary state which controlled the British Isles until the Stuart Restoration in 1660.

Political and religious conflict between Charles I and his opponents dated to the early years of his reign. While the vast majority supported the institution of monarchy, they disagreed on who held ultimate authority. Royalists generally argued political and religious bodies were subordinate to the king, while most of their Parliamentarian opponents backed a limited form of constitutional monarchy. This was worsened by differences over religion and religious freedom. Reformed Protestants such as the English Puritans and Scottish Covenanters opposed the changes Charles tried to impose on the Protestant state churches of England and Scotland. In Ireland, the only one with a Catholic majority, the Irish Confederates wanted an end to anti-Catholic discrimination, greater self-governance, and a reversal of land grants to Protestant settlers.

The conflicts began with the Bishops' Wars of 1639–1640, when Scottish Covenanters who opposed Charles' religious reforms gained control of Scotland and briefly occupied northern England. Irish Catholics launched a rebellion in 1641, which developed into ethnic conflict with Protestant settlers. The Irish Catholic Confederation, formed to control the rebellion, held most of Ireland in the ensuing war against the Royalists, Parliamentarians, and Covenanters. Although all three agreed on the need to quell the rebellion, none trusted the other two with control of an army raised to do so. In August 1642, failure to break the resulting political deadlock sparked the First English Civil War, which pitted Royalists against both the Parliamentarians and their Covenanter allies in England and Wales.

The war in England ended when Charles surrendered to the Scots in 1646, but divisions among his opponents and his refusal to make significant political concessions caused a renewed outbreak of fighting in 1648. In the Second English Civil War, Parliamentarians again defeated the Royalists and a Covenanter faction called the Engagers. The Parliamentarian New Model Army then purged England's parliament of those who wanted to continue negotiations with the king. The resulting Rump Parliament approved his execution in January 1649 and founded the republican Commonwealth of England. In the Treaty of Breda, the Scots agreed to restore Charles II to the English throne, but were defeated in the 1650–1652 Anglo-Scottish war. Under Oliver Cromwell, the Commonwealth conquered Ireland and most Irish Catholic lands were seized. The British Isles became a united republic ruled by Cromwell and dominated by the army. There were sporadic uprisings until the monarchy was restored in 1660.

== Nomenclature ==
The term Wars of the Three Kingdoms first appears in A Brief Chronicle of all the Chief Actions so fatally Falling out in the three Kingdoms by James Heath, published in 1662, but historian Ian Gentles argues "there is no stable, agreed title for the events....which have been variously labelled the Great Rebellion, the Puritan Revolution, the English Civil War, the English Revolution and… the Wars of the Three Kingdoms." It is generally used by modern historians who see the conflicts in each state as driven by overlapping but often distinct issues, rather than as mere background to the English Civil War, while others have labelled them the British Civil Wars.

== Background ==
=== General ===
After 1541, monarchs of England styled their Irish territory as a Kingdom—replacing the Lordship of Ireland—and ruled there with the assistance of a separate Irish Parliament. Additionally, with the Laws in Wales Acts 1535 and 1542, Henry VIII integrated Wales more closely into the Kingdom of England. Scotland, the third separate kingdom, was governed by the House of Stuart.

By means of the English Reformation, King Henry VIII made himself head of the Protestant Church of England and outlawed Catholicism in England and Wales. In the course of the 16th century, Protestantism became intimately associated with national identity in England; Catholicism had come to be seen as the national enemy, particularly as it was embodied in the rivals France and Spain. Catholicism, however, remained the religion of most people in Ireland and for many Irish was an act of native resistance against the Tudor conquest of Ireland.

In the Kingdom of Scotland, the Protestant Reformation was a popular movement led by John Knox. The Scottish Parliament legislated for a national Presbyterian church—namely the Church of Scotland or the Kirk—and Mary, Queen of Scots, a Catholic, was forced to abdicate in favour of her son James VI of Scotland. James grew up under a regency disputed between Catholic and Protestant factions; when he took power, he aspired to be a "universal King", favouring the English Episcopalian system of bishops appointed by the king. In 1584, he introduced bishops into the Church of Scotland, but was met with vigorous opposition, and he had to concede that the General Assembly of the Church of Scotland would continue to run the church.

The personal union of the three kingdoms under one monarch came about when King James VI of Scotland succeeded Elizabeth I to the English throne in 1603, when he also became King James I of England and of Ireland. In 1625, Charles I succeeded his father and marked three main concerns regarding England and Wales: how to fund his government, how to reform the church, and how to limit the English Parliament's interference in his rule. At that time, he showed little interest in his other two kingdoms, Scotland and Ireland.

=== Scotland ===
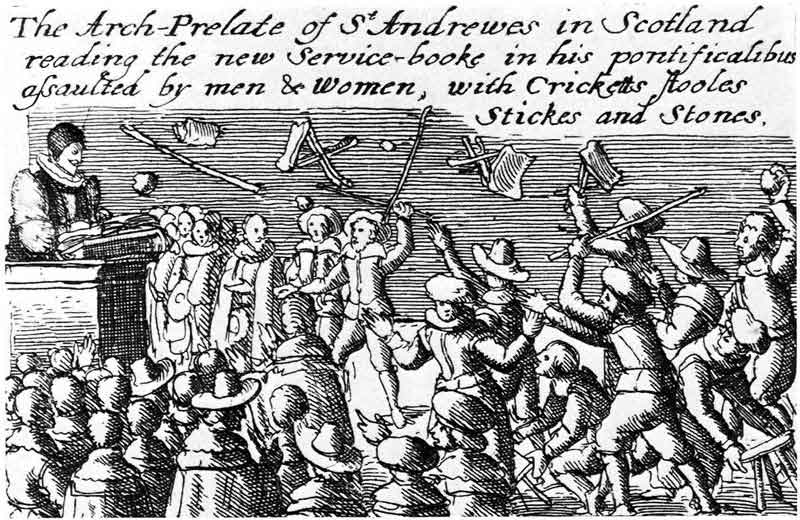
The spark, a riot in St Giles' Cathedral, Edinburgh, reputedly started by Jenny Geddes throwing a wooden stool

James VI remained Protestant, taking care to maintain his hopes of succession to the English throne. He duly became James I of England in 1603 and moved to London. James concentrated on dealing with the English court and Parliament, running Scotland through written instructions to the Privy Council of Scotland and controlling the Parliament of Scotland through the Lords of the Articles. He constrained the authority of the General Assembly of the Church of Scotland and stopped it from meeting, then increased the number of bishops in the Church of Scotland. In 1618, he held a General Assembly and pushed through Five Articles of Episcopalian practices, which were widely boycotted.

After his death in 1625, James was succeeded by his son Charles I, who was crowned in Holyrood Palace, Edinburgh, in 1633, with full Anglican rites. Charles was less skillful and restrained than his father; his attempts to enforce Anglican practices in the Church of Scotland created opposition which reached a flashpoint when he introduced the Scottish Prayer Book, a revised version of the Anglican Book of Common Prayer. His confrontation with the Scots came to a head in 1639, when he tried and failed to coerce Scotland by military means during the Bishops' Wars.

=== England ===
Charles shared his father's belief in the Divine Right of Kings, and his persistent assertion of this standard seriously disrupted relations between the Crown and the English Parliament. The Church of England remained dominant, but a powerful Puritan minority, represented by about one third of Parliament, began to assert themselves; their religious precepts had much in common with the Presbyterian Scots.

The English Parliament and the king had repeated disputes over taxation, military expenditure, and the role of the Parliament in government. While James I had held much the same opinions as his son regarding Royal Prerogatives, he usually had enough discretion and charisma to persuade Parliamentarians to accept his thinking. Charles had no such skill and, faced with multiple crises during 1639–1642, he failed to prevent his kingdoms from sliding into civil war. When Charles approached Parliament to pay for a campaign against the Scots, they refused. They then declared themselves to be permanently in session—the Long Parliament—and soon presented Charles with a long list of civil and religious grievances requiring his remedy before they would approve any new legislation.

=== English overseas possessions ===
During the English Civil War, the English overseas possessions became highly involved. In the Channel Islands, the island of Jersey and Castle Cornet in Guernsey supported the King until a surrender with honour in December 1651.

Although the newer, Puritan settlements in North America, notably Massachusetts, were dominated by Parliamentarians, the older colonies to the south sided with the Crown. Friction between Royalists, most of whom were Anglican, and Puritans in Maryland came to a head in the Battle of the Severn. The Virginia Company's settlements, Bermuda and Virginia, as well as Antigua and Barbados, were conspicuous in their loyalty to the Crown. Bermuda's Independent Puritans were expelled, settling the Bahamas under William Sayle as the Eleutheran Adventurers. Parliament passed An Act for prohibiting Trade with the Barbadoes, Virginia, Bermuda and Antego in October, 1650 that prohibited all trade with the rebellious colonies of Barbados, Antigua, Bermuda, and Virginia, and granting permission to English privateers to seize any ships belonging to merchants, including foreigners, who traded with those colonies.

Far to the North, Bermuda's regiment of Militia and its coastal batteries prepared to resist an invasion that never came. Built-up inside the natural defence of a nearly impassable barrier reef, to fend off the might of Spain, these defences would have been a formidable obstacle for the Parliamentary fleet sent in 1651 under the command of Admiral Sir George Ayscue to subdue the trans-Atlantic colonies, but after the fall of Barbados, the Bermudians made a separate peace that respected the internal status quo. The Parliament of Bermuda avoided the Parliament of England's fate during The Protectorate, becoming one of the oldest continuous legislatures in the world.

Virginia's population swelled with Cavaliers during and after the English Civil War. Even so, Virginia Puritan Richard Bennett was made Governor answering to Cromwell in 1652, followed by two more nominal "Commonwealth Governors". The loyalty of Virginia's Cavaliers to the Crown was rewarded after the 1660 Restoration of the Monarchy when Charles II dubbed it the Old Dominion.

=== Ireland ===
Meanwhile, in the Kingdom of Ireland (proclaimed such in 1541 but only fully conquered for the Crown in 1603), tensions had also begun to mount. Thomas Wentworth, Charles I's Lord Deputy of Ireland, angered Catholics by enforcing new taxes while denying them full rights as subjects; he further antagonised wealthy Irish Catholics by repeated initiatives to confiscate and transfer their lands to English colonists. Conditions became explosive in 1639 when Wentworth offered Irish Catholics some reforms in return for their raising and funding an Irish army (led by Protestant officers) to put down the Scottish rebellion. The idea of an Irish Catholic army enforcing what many saw as already tyrannical government horrified both the Scottish and the English Parliaments, which in response threatened to invade Ireland.

== Wars ==
Charles' initial failure to end the Bishops' Wars of 1639 and 1640 quickly persuaded the antagonists that force could serve them better than negotiation. The imposition of Bishops and other Anglican practices to the Scottish Kirk were opposed by most Scots, who supported a Presbyterian system of governance led by a General Assembly, and in individual churches by ministers and committees of elders. The 1638 National Covenant pledged to oppose such imposed "innovations". Signatories were known as Covenanters.

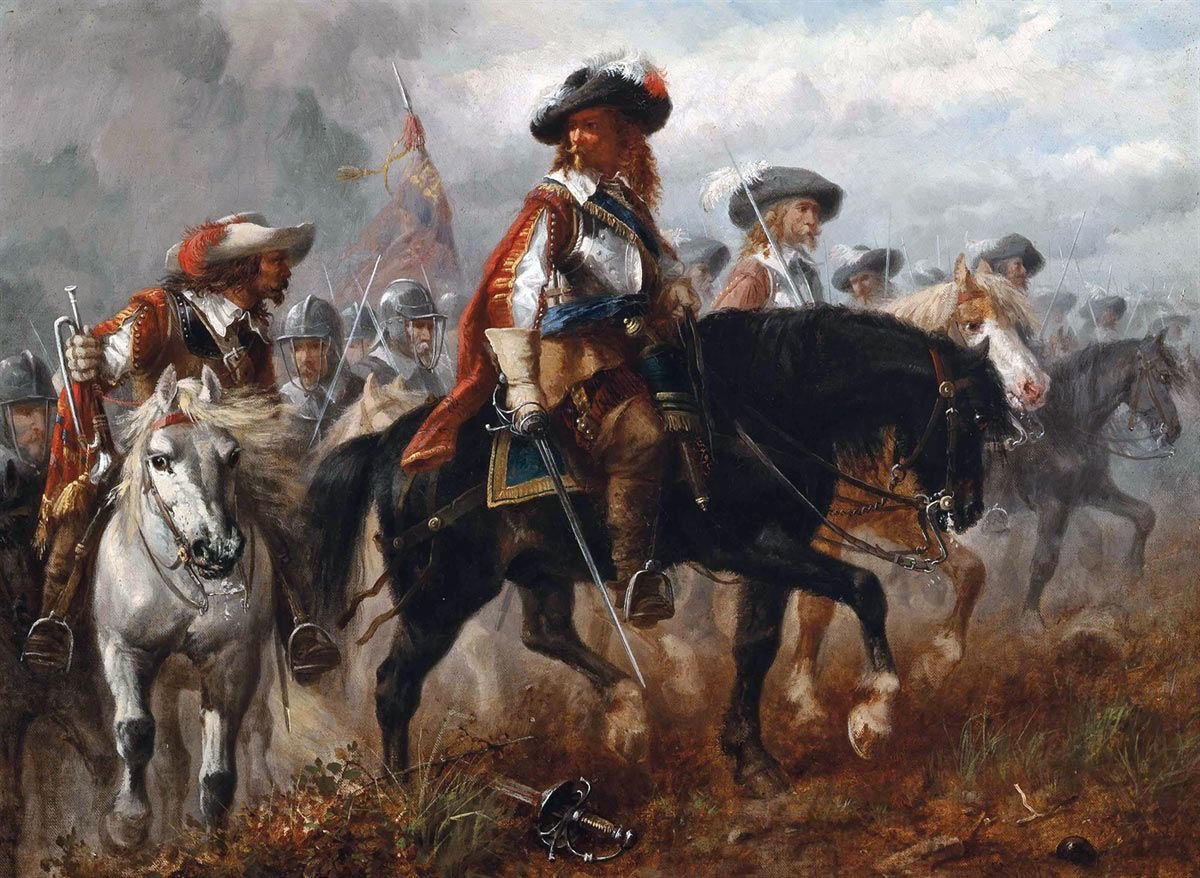
King Charles I and Prince Rupert before the Battle of Naseby

In Ireland, alienated by Church of England domination and frightened by the rhetoric of the English and Scottish Parliaments, a small group of Irish conspirators launched the Irish Rebellion of 1641, ostensibly in support of the "King's Rights". The uprising featured widespread violent assaults on Protestant communities in Ireland, both Anglican and dissenter Protestants in Ulster whose practice was similar to the Scottish Kirk. In England and Scotland, rumours spread that the killings had the king's sanction, which, for many, foreshadowed their own fate if the king's Irish troops landed in Britain. Thus the English Parliament refused to pay for a royal army to put down the rebellion in Ireland; instead Parliament decided to raise its own armed forces. The king did likewise, rallying those Royalists (some of them members of Parliament) who believed their fortunes were best served by loyalty to the king.

The English Civil War ignited in 1642. Scottish Covenanters (as Presbyterians there called themselves) joined forces with the English Parliament in late 1643 and played a major role in the ultimate Parliamentary victory. Over the course of more than two years, the king's forces were ground down by the efficiency of those of Parliament, including the New Model Army, backed as they were by the financial muscle of the City of London. On 5 May 1646, at Southwell, Charles I surrendered to the Scottish army besieging Newark-on-Trent. What remained of the English and Welsh Royalist armies and garrisons, surrendered piecemeal over the next few months.

Meanwhile, the rebellious Irish Catholics formed their own government—Confederate Ireland—intending to help the Royalists in return for religious toleration and political autonomy. Troops from England and Scotland fought in Ireland, and Irish Confederate troops mounted an expedition to Scotland in 1644, sparking the Scottish Civil War. There, the Royalists gained a series of victories in 1644–1645, but were crushed after the main Covenanter armies returned to Scotland upon the end of the first English Civil War.

The Scots handed Charles over to the English and returned to Scotland, the English Parliament having paid them a large sum for their expenses in the English campaign. After his surrender, Charles was approached by the Scots, the Presbyterians in the English Parliament, and the Grandees of the New Model Army, all attempting to reach an accommodation with him and among themselves which would achieve peace while preserving the crown. But now, a breach between the New Model Army and Parliament widened day by day, until the Puritans in Parliament, with allies among the Scots and the remaining Royalists, saw themselves strong enough to challenge the Army, which began the Second English Civil War.

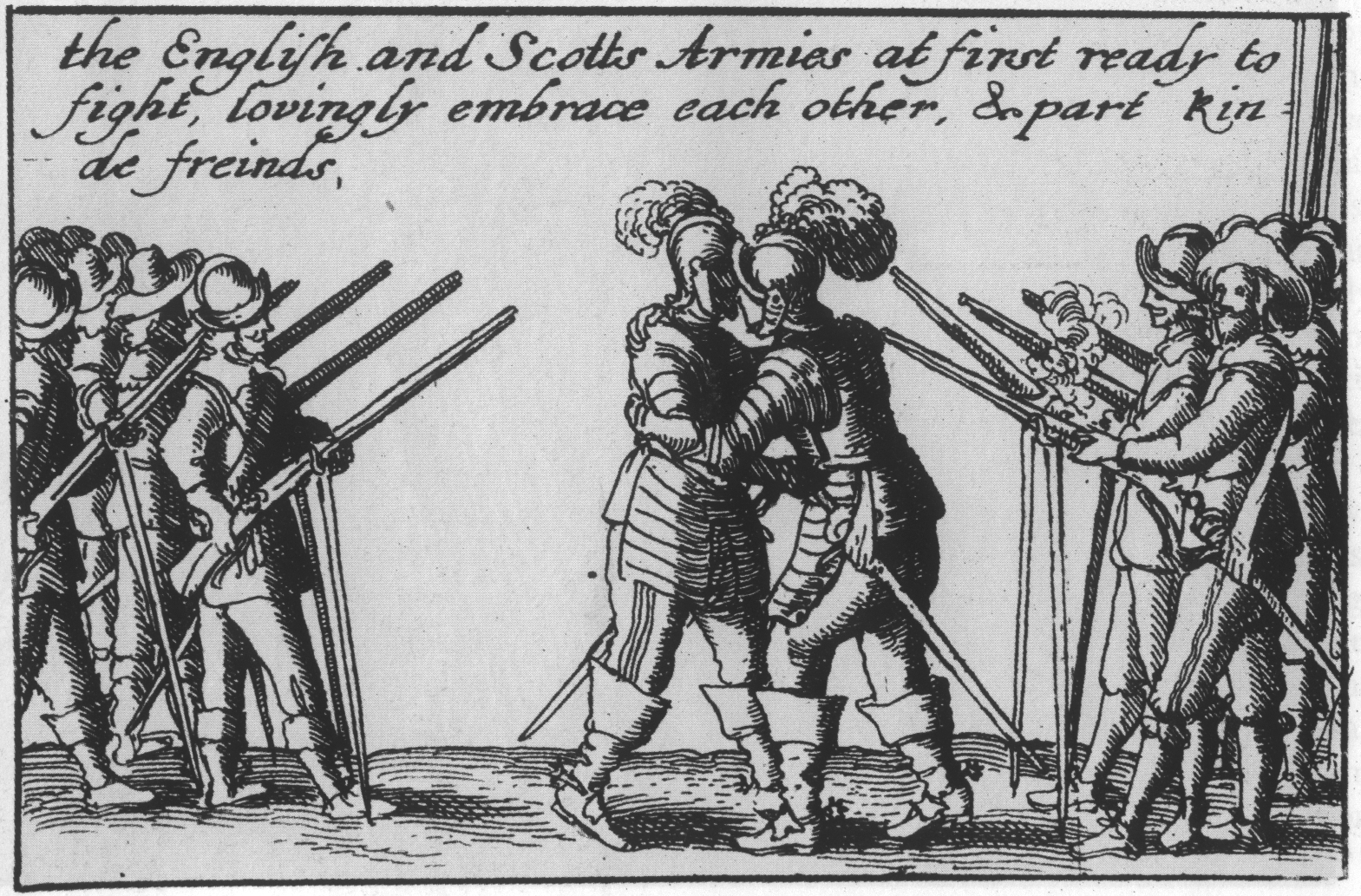
The English and Scots armies lovingly embrace each other.

The New Model Army vanquished the English Royalists and Parliamentarians, as well as their Scottish Engager allies. On account of his secret machinations with the Scottish Engagers, Charles was charged with treason against England. Subsequently, the Grandees and their civilian supporters failed to reconcile with the king or the Puritan majority in Parliament. The Grandees acted, and soldiers were used to purge the English Parliament of those who opposed the Army. The resultant Rump Parliament of the Long Parliament then passed enabling legislation for putting Charles I on trial for treason. He was found guilty of treason against the English commons and was executed on 30 January 1649.

After the execution of King Charles I the Rump Parliament passed a series of acts declaring that England was a republic; that the House of Commons—without the House of Lords—would sit as the legislature; and that a Council of State would act as the executive power. In the other two kingdoms the execution of Charles caused the warring parties to unite, and they recognised Charles II as king of Great Britain, France and Ireland.

To deal with the threat to the English Commonwealth posed by the two kingdoms (Ireland and Scotland), the Rump Parliament first appointed Cromwell to invade and subdue Ireland. In August 1649, he landed an English army at Rathmines shortly after the Siege of Dublin was abandoned by the Royalists following the Battle of Rathmines. Then, in late May 1650, Cromwell left one army to continue the Irish conquest and returned to England and to take command of a second English army which preemptively invaded Scotland. On 3 September 1650, he defeated the Scottish Covenanters at the Battle of Dunbar, and his forces then occupied Edinburgh and Scotland south of the River Forth. Cromwell was advancing the bulk of his army over the Forth towards Stirling; when Charles II, commanding a Scottish Royalist army, stole a march on the English commander and invaded England from his base in Scotland. Cromwell divided his forces, leaving part in Scotland to complete the conquest there, then led the rest south in pursuit of Charles II.

The Royalist army failed to gather much support from English Royalists as it moved south into England; so, instead of heading directly towards London and certain defeat, Charles aimed for Worcester hoping that Wales and the West and Midlands of England would rise against the Commonwealth. This did not happen and, one year to the day after the Battle of Dunbar, the New Model Army and the English militia regiments vanquished the last Royalist army of the English Civil War at the Battle of Worcester on 3 September 1651. It was the last and most decisive battle in the Wars of the Three Kingdoms.

== Aftermath ==
Having defeated all organised opposition, the Grandees of the Parliamentary New Model Army and their civilian supporters dominated the politics of all three nations for the next nine years (see Interregnum (1649–1660)). As for England, the Rump Parliament had already decreed it was a republic and a Commonwealth. Ireland and Scotland were now subjugated and ruled by military governors, and constituent representatives from both nations were seated in the Rump Parliament of the Protectorate, where they were dominated by Oliver Cromwell, the Lord Protector. When Cromwell died in 1658, control of the Commonwealth became unstable. In early 1660, General George Monck, commanding English occupation forces in Scotland, ordered his troops from the Coldstream barracks, marched them south into England, and seized control of London by February 1660. There he accumulated allies and agreements among the English and London establishments, including the newly constituted Convention Parliament, to which he was elected a member. Monck, first a Royalist campaigner, then a Parliamentary soldier, now contrived the Restoration of the monarchy. Monck arranged that the Convention Parliament would invite Charles II to return as king of the three realms—which was done by act of Parliament on 1 May 1660.

The Wars of the Three Kingdoms prefigured many of the changes that ultimately would shape modern Britain but, in the short term, these conflicts in fact resolved little for the kingdoms and peoples. The English Commonwealth did achieve a notable compromise between the monarchy and republic which survived destabilising problems for nearly the next two hundred years. In practice, Oliver Cromwell exercised political power through his control over Parliament's military forces, but his legal position—and provisions for his succession—remained unclear, even after he became Lord Protector. None of the several constitutions proposed during this period was achieved. Thus the Commonwealth and Protectorate of the Parliamentarians—the wars' victors—left no significant new form of government in place after their time.

Still, in the long term, two abiding legacies of British democracy were established during this period:

- after the execution of King Charles I for high treason, no future British monarch could expect that their subjects would tolerate perceived despotism—the "divine right of kings" no longer existed;
- the excesses of the New Model Army, particularly those during the Rule of the Major-Generals, left an abiding mistrust of military dictators and military rule, which persists until today among peoples of British descent or national association. (Note: "Around the rule of the Major-Generals there has grown a legend of military oppression which obscures the limits both of their impact and of their unpopularity" (Worden 1986, p. 134))

Some English Protestants experienced religious freedom during the Interregnum, but there was none for English Catholics. During the term of their control, the Puritan partisans abolished the Church of England and the House of Lords. Cromwell denounced the Rump Parliament and dissolved it by force, but he failed to establish an acceptable alternative. Nor did he and his supporters move in the direction of popular democracy, as the more radical Parliamentarians (the Levellers) wanted.

During the Interregnum, the New Model Army occupied Ireland and Scotland. In Ireland, the new government confiscated almost all lands belonging to Irish Catholics as punishment for the rebellion of 1641; harsh Penal Laws also restricted this community. Thousands of Parliamentarian soldiers settled in Ireland on confiscated lands. The Commonwealth abolished the Parliaments of Ireland and Scotland. In theory, these countries had representation in the English Parliament, but as this body never held real powers, representation was ineffective. When Cromwell died in 1658 the Commonwealth fell apart—but without major violence. Historians record that adroit politicians of the time, especially George Monck, prevailed over the looming crisis; Monck in particular was deemed the victor sine sanguine, i.e., "without blood", of the Restoration crisis. And in 1660, Charles II was restored as king of England, Scotland, and Ireland.

Under the English Restoration the political system returned to the prewar constitutional position. Although Charles II's Declaration of Breda in April 1660 had offered reconciliation and promised a general pardon for crimes committed during the English Civil War, the new regime executed or imprisoned for life those directly involved in the regicide of Charles I. Royalists dug up Cromwell's corpse and performed a posthumous execution. The religiously and politically motivated individuals held responsible for the wars suffered harsh repression. Scotland and Ireland regained their Parliaments, some Irish retrieved confiscated lands, and the New Model Army was disbanded. However, the issues which had caused the wars—religion, the powers of Parliament vis-á-vis the king, and the relationships between the three kingdoms—remained unresolved or, more accurately, postponed, only to re-emerge as matters disputed again and leading to the Glorious Revolution of 1688. Only later did the broader features of modern Britain, foreshadowed in the civil wars, emerge permanently; namely: a Protestant constitutional monarchy with a strong standing army under civilian control.

== See also ==
- Cromwellian conquest of Ireland
- English Civil War
- English overseas possessions in the Wars of the Three Kingdoms
- European wars of religion
- Outline of the wars of the Three Kingdoms
- Thirty Years' War
- Timeline of the Wars of the Three Kingdoms
- The Troubles

== Sources ==
- Abbott, Wilbur Cortez (1939). The Writings and Speeches of Oliver Cromwell. Vol. II: The Commonwealth 1649–1653. Cambridge: Harvard University Press.
- Atkinson, Charles Francis (1911), "Great Rebellion" , in Chisholm, Hugh (ed.), Encyclopædia Britannica, vol. 12 (11th ed.), Cambridge University Press, pp. 403–421
- Burnet, Gilbert (1753). Bishop Burnet's History of His Own Time: From the Restoration of Charles II to the Treaty of Peace at Utrecht, in the Reign of Queen Anne. London: A. Millar.
- Carlton, Charles (1994) [1992]. Going to the wars: the experience of the British civil wars, 1638–1651. Routledge. ISBN 0-415-10391-6.
- Gardiner, Samuel Rawson, ed. (1906). "The Charge against the King". The Constitutional Documents of the Puritan Revolution 1625–1660. Oxford: Clarendon.
- Gaunt, Peter (1997). The British Wars 1637–1651. UK: Routledge. ISBN 0-415-12966-4.. An 88-page pamphlet.
- Gentles, Ian (2007). "The English Revolution and the Wars in the Three Kingdoms, 1638–1652". In Scott, H. M.; Collins, B. W. (eds.). Modern Wars in Perspective. Harlow, UK: Pearson Longman.
- Henning, Basil Duke, ed. (1983). "Monck, George (1608–1670), of Potheridge, Merton, Devon". The History of Parliament: the House of Commons 1660–1690. Boydell and Brewer. Archived from the original on 6 March 2016 – via History of Parliament Online.
- Jane, Lionel Cecil (1905). The coming of Parliament; England from 1350 to 1660. New York: G.P. Putnam's Sons. pp. 376–377.
- Pepys, Samuel (1660). The Diary of Samuel Pepys – via Wikisource.
- Raymond, Joad (2005). The invention of the newspaper: English newsbooks, 1641–1649. Oxford University Press. p. 281. ISBN 978-0-19-928234-0.
- Worden, Blair (1986). Stuart England (illustrated ed.). Phaidon. ISBN 978-0714823911.
