= Bishops' Wars =

British wars 1639–1640 concerning religion in Scotland

- Part of the Wars of the Three Kingdoms
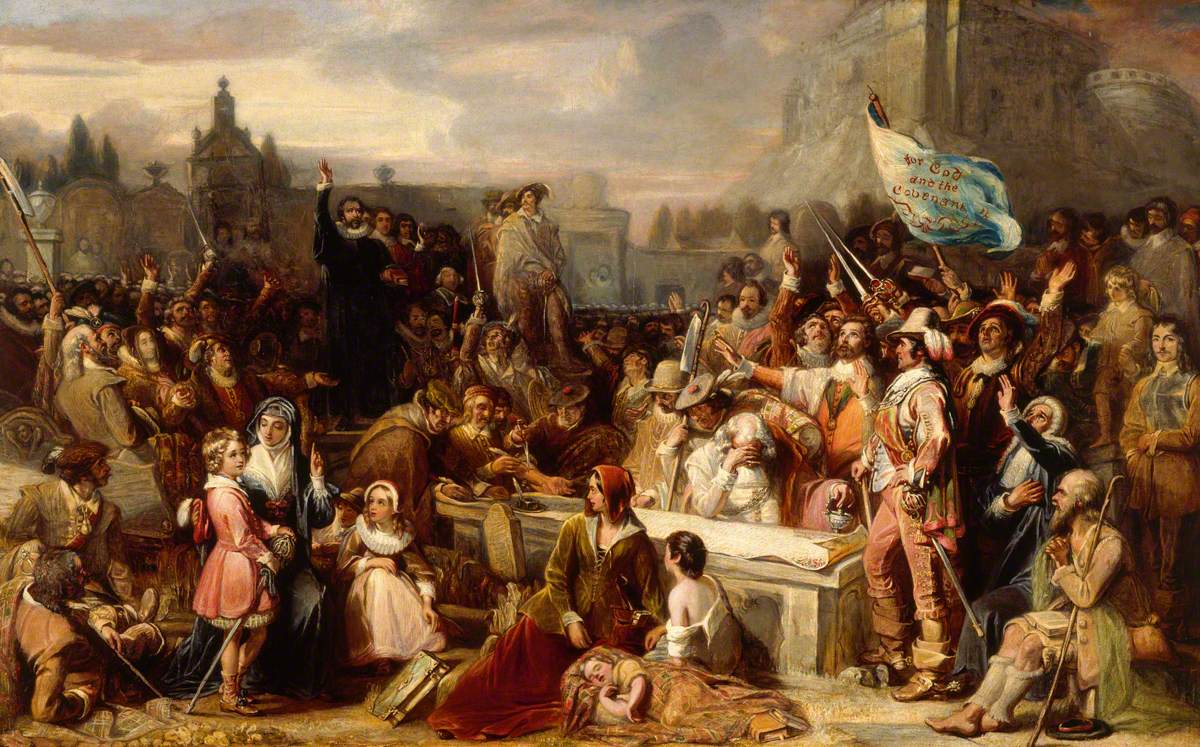
- The Signing of the National Covenant in Greyfriars Kirkyard by William Allan, 1838
Date	21 March 1639 – September 1640
Location	Scotland, Northern England
Result	Covenanter victory

Belligerents
Scottish Covenanters	(Kingdom of Scotland) Scottish Royalists Kingdom of England

Commanders and leaders
Alexander Leslie (Note: Leslie was ennobled as 1st Earl of Leven and Hamilton promoted to a duke after hostilities had ended. Strafford was made an earl between the 1st and 2nd Bishops' Wars.); Marquess of Argyll; Marquess of Montrose	(Kingdom of Scotland) (Kingdom of England) Charles I; (Kingdom of Scotland) Marquess of Hamilton; (Kingdom of Scotland) Viscount Aboyne; (Kingdom of Scotland) Marquess of Huntly; (Kingdom of England) Lord Conway; (Kingdom of England) Earl of Strafford

Strength
20,000	20,000–25,000

Casualties and losses
300–600	300–400

The Bishops' Wars were two wars fought in 1639 and 1640 between Charles I and his Covenanter opponents in Scotland. (Note: Scottish Gaelic: Cogaidhean nan Easbaigean) They were the first of the Wars of the Three Kingdoms, which also include the First and Second English Civil Wars, the Irish Confederate Wars, and the 1650 to 1652 Anglo-Scottish War.

In 1637, Charles I, then king of Scotland and England, imposed changes in religious practice on the Church of Scotland. These were resented by many Scots, leading to the signing of a National Covenant in 1638, pledging to prevent their implementation. The General Assembly of the Church of Scotland then expelled bishops, turning a religious dispute into a struggle for political supremacy. The new Covenanter government raised an army to prevent Charles using force to restore his authority.

The First Bishops' War began in early 1639, when there was minor skirmishing between Covenanters and Royalists in north-east Scotland. In June, English and Scottish armies assembled near Berwick-upon-Tweed, but withdrew without fighting, after signing the Treaty of Berwick (1639). The terms included calling a new General Assembly and Parliament of Scotland, which Charles hoped would reverse their earlier decisions. Their confirmation instead led to the Second Bishops' War in 1640.

The Scots invaded and occupied parts of northern England, after winning the Battle of Newburn. Under the interim Treaty of Ripon, the occupation continued pending a final settlement, during which Charles agreed to pay their expenses. This required him to recall the Parliament of England to raise money and ratify the treaty, which was completed in August 1641. This ended the Bishops' Wars, but political differences between Charles and the new English Parliament led to the First English Civil War in August 1642.

== Background ==
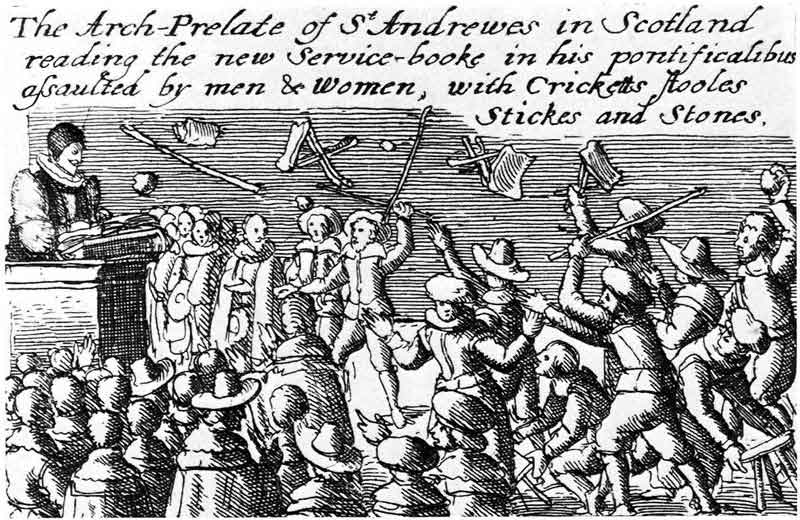
Riots over the Prayer book, allegedly sparked by Jenny Geddes

The Reformation in Scotland created a Church of Scotland, informally referred to as the Kirk, that was Presbyterian in structure, and Calvinist in doctrine. While Presbyterian and Episcopalian now imply differences in both structure and doctrine, this was not the case in the 17th century. Despite shared Protestant beliefs, Episcopalian churches were governed by bishops, usually appointed by the monarch, Presbyterian by presbyters, elected by ministers and elders. This meant arguments over the role of bishops were as much about politics, and the extent of royal authority, as they were about religious practice.

The vast majority of Scots, whether Covenanter or Royalist, believed a "well-ordered" monarchy was divinely mandated; they disagreed on what "well-ordered" meant, and who held ultimate authority in clerical affairs. In general, Royalists viewed the monarch as head of both church and state, while Covenanters held this applied only to secular matters, and "Chryst Jesus ... was King of the Kirk". However, there were many other factors, including nationalist allegiance to the Kirk, and individual motives were very complex; Montrose was a Covenanter in 1639 and 1640 before becoming a Royalist, and switching sides was common throughout the period.

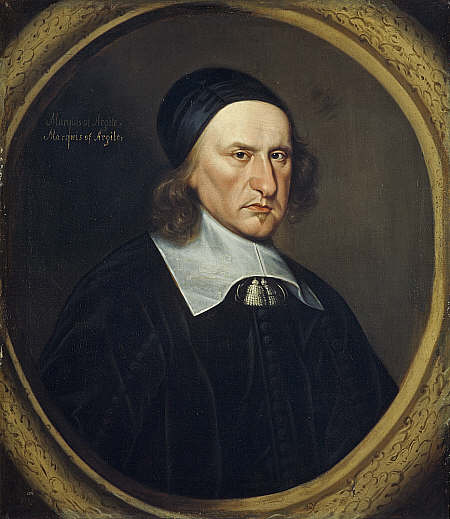
Covenanter political leader, the Marquess of Argyll

When James VI and I succeeded as king of England in 1603, he viewed a unified Church of Scotland and England as the first step in creating a centralised, Unionist state. This policy was adopted by his son, Charles I, but the two were very different in doctrine; many in both Scotland and England considered Charles' reforms to the Church of England as essentially Catholic.

This mattered because fears of a Catholic revival remained widespread, even though by the 1630s Catholicism was practised only by some of the aristocracy, and in the remote Highlands. Scots volunteers and mercenaries fought on the Protestant side in the Thirty Years' War, while Scotland had close economic and cultural links with the Dutch Republic, then fighting for independence from Catholic Spain. In addition, many Scots had been educated in French Huguenot universities, the majority of which had been suppressed by Louis XIII in the 1620s.

A general perception that Protestant Europe was under attack meant increased sensitivity to changes in church practice. In 1636, a new Book of Canons replaced John Knox's Book of Discipline and excommunicated anyone who denied the King's supremacy in church matters. When followed in 1637 by William Laud's Scottish Book of Common Prayer, the result was anger and widespread rioting, said to have been set off with the throwing of a stool by Jenny Geddes during a service in St. Giles Cathedral. Historians like Mark Kishlansky now argue her action was not spontaneous, but one in a series of planned and co-ordinated opposition to the Prayer book, the origin of which was as much political as religious. These culminated in February 1638, when delegates from across Scotland agreed a National Covenant, pledging resistance to liturgical "innovations".

The Marquess of Argyll and six other members of the Scottish Privy Council backed the Covenant. Charles agreed to defer discussion of the new canons to the General Assembly of the Church of Scotland, but at the same time told his supporters that he had no intention of making concessions. As a consequence, when the Assembly gathered in Glasgow in December it rejected the changes, expelled bishops from the Kirk, and affirmed its right to meet annually, not just when granted permission. The Marquis of Hamilton, Charles' chief advisor on Scottish affairs, now advised him there was no alternative to war.

== First Bishops' War ==
Locations of The First Bishops' War, 1639

Charles decided to re-assert his authority by force, using his own financial resources and thus avoiding the need to recall Parliament to obtain tax funding. An English army of 20,000 would advance on Edinburgh from the south, while an amphibious force of 5,000 under the Marquis of Hamilton landed on the east coast, where it would link up with Royalist troops led by the Marquess of Huntly. Lastly, an Irish army under the Earl of Antrim would invade western Scotland from Carrickfergus, where he would join forces with the MacDonalds and other Royalist clans.

This overly complex plan quickly fell apart. On 21 March 1639, the Covenanters occupied Edinburgh Castle, then secured likely landing places on the West Coast, notably Dumbarton Castle. This ended any prospect of an Irish landing, while Hamilton's amphibious force was unable to disembark after finding the Forth estuary strongly defended.

Despite widespread domestic support for the Covenant, this was less so in north-east Scotland, particularly in Aberdeenshire and Banffshire. Recognising this, the Covenanter government ordered a force of 8,000 under Montrose to occupy Aberdeen, which fell bloodlessly on 30 March. On 13 May, the Royalists won a minor victory at the so-called Trot of Turriff, where a Royalist soldier became the first casualty of the Wars of the Three Kingdoms. Royalists under Viscount Aboyne retook Aberdeen, but were then defeated on 19 June at the Brig of Dee by Montrose. This was the only significant engagement of the First Bishops' War.

The First Bishops' War was unpopular in England, where it was labelled "King Charles's northern follies" by many within the English media and political class. Since only Parliament could approve taxes, Charles tried to fund the war using forced loans, coat and conduct money, impressments, and requiring the civilian population to provide accommodation for his troops. This resulted in widespread anti-war sentiment among those from whom his army was recruited, with several instances of men attacking their own officers. Internal conflict was enhanced by Covenanter propaganda, and meant many English politicians opposed the war.

In May, an English army of around 15,000 assembled at the border town of Berwick-upon-Tweed. The vast majority were untrained conscripts from the northern trained bands or militia, many armed only with bows and arrows. Charles tried to compensate by recruiting foreign mercenaries from the Spanish Netherlands, exposing him to accusations of using foreign Catholics against his own subjects. Though both sides included large numbers of professional soldiers who had served in the European wars, many of the senior English commands went to Charles' favourites, who were largely inexperienced. This was exacerbated by factional disputes within the leadership, some of whom like the Presbyterian Robert Devereux, 3rd Earl of Essex, appeared unclear as to what they were fighting for.

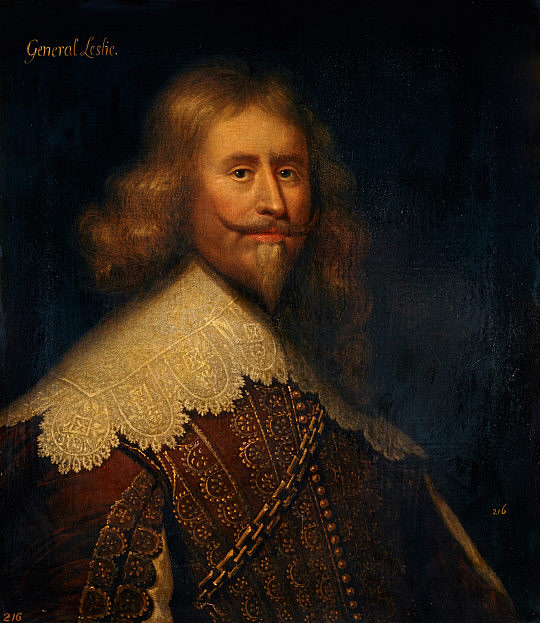
Alexander Leslie; Covenanter military commander

The English faced a Scottish force of 16,500 led by the veteran Alexander Leslie, who had served with the Swedes in the Thirty Years' War. On 14 May, Charles announced the Scottish army would be destroyed if it moved to within ten miles of the border. On 3 June, a small force of cavalry was sent to investigate reports Scottish troops had reached Kelso, well within the limit. Encountering Scottish units, the English feared they were outnumbered, and retreated back across the border without a shot being fired. Their retreat further lowered English morale, while the Scots now felt confident enough to ignore the 10 mile limit, and on 5 June advanced as far as Duns.

Neither side was anxious to fight and opened negotiations on 11 June, concluding with the signing of the Pacification of Berwick on 19 June. This referred all disputed questions either to the General Assembly, or Parliament of Scotland. However, both sides viewed this as a temporary truce, and continued preparations for another military confrontation.

== Interlude ==
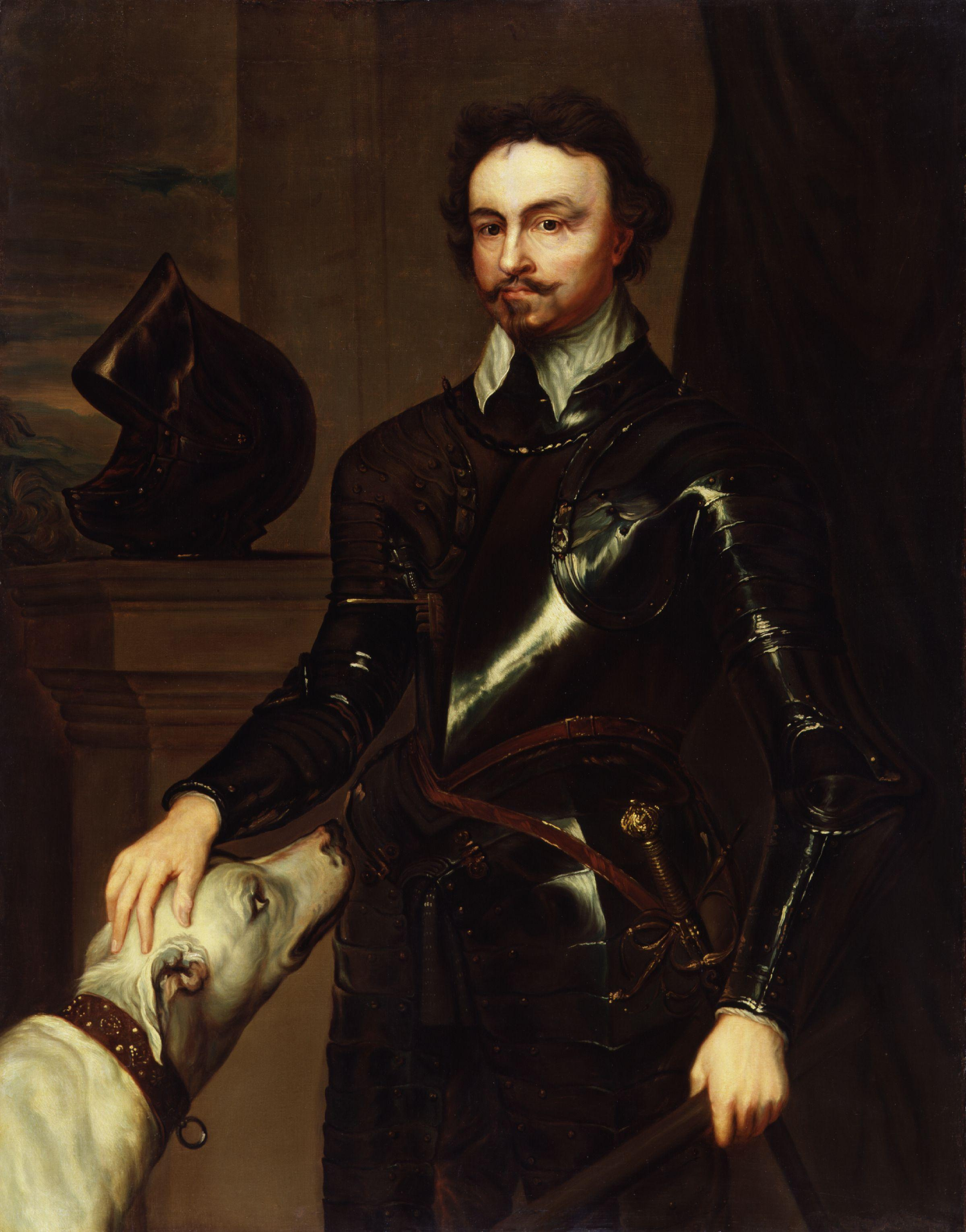
Thomas Wentworth, 1st Earl of Strafford, and organiser of the King's forces for the Second War

The General Assembly met again in August 1639 and confirmed the decisions previously taken at Glasgow, which were then ratified by the Scottish Parliament. When Charles' representative, Lord Traquair, tried to suspend it, his action was declared illegal and Parliament continued to sit. A series of acts were passed which amounted to a constitutional revolution, including Tri-annual Parliaments, and making the Covenant compulsory for all holders of public office.

His advisors convinced Charles the only way to finance a second war was to recall the English Parliament, and in December 1639, he issued writs for the first time since 1629. Thomas Wentworth, 1st Earl of Strafford, his most capable advisor and Lord Deputy of Ireland also asked the Parliament of Ireland for funds. In March 1640, they approved an army of 9,000 to suppress the Covenanters, despite violent opposition from their co-religionists in Ulster. This provides an example of how the Bishops Wars destabilised all three kingdoms.

Charles hoped this would provide an example for the Short Parliament, which assembled in April; however, led by John Pym, Parliament demanded he address grievances like ship money before they would approve subsidies. After three weeks of stalemate, Charles dissolved Parliament, ensuring he would have to rely on his own resources to fund the war. Meanwhile, in January 1640 the Covenanter leaders mustered their regiments, and to secure their rear, occupied Aberdeen, centre of the Royalist north-east.

== Second Bishops' War ==
The Newburn campaign, 1640

In June, the Scottish Parliament met in Edinburgh, and granted Argyll a commission of 'fire and sword' against the Royalist areas of Lochaber, Badenoch and Rannoch in the Scottish Highlands. A force of 5,000 conducted this campaign with great brutality, burning and looting across a large area, one of the most infamous acts being the destruction of Airlie Castle in Angus. As they had done in the First Bishops' War, the Covenanter forces also seized Dumbarton Castle, preventing Strafford's Irish army from landing in Scotland and so enabling them to focus on the threatened English invasion.

The Scottish army was again led by Leslie and consisted of around 21,000 well-equipped men, and possessed vastly superior artillery compared to its opponents. Further, a large group of soldiers had gained previous combat experience as mercenaries on the Continent during the Thirty Years' War. The English troops consisted largely of militia from Southern England, poorly-equipped, unpaid, and unenthusiastic about the war. On the march north, lack of supplies meant they looted the areas they passed through, creating widespread disorder; several units murdered officers suspected of being Catholics, then deserted.

Lord Conway, the English commander in the north, focused on reinforcing Berwick-upon-Tweed, the usual starting point for invading England. On 17 August, cavalry units under Montrose crossed the River Tweed, followed by the rest of Leslie's army. The Scots bypassed the town, and headed for Newcastle-upon-Tyne, centre of the coal trade with London, and a valuable bargaining point.

On 28 August, the Scots forced a passage over the River Tyne at the Battle of Newburn; they still had to take Newcastle, but to Leslie's surprise, when they arrived on 30 August, Conway had withdrawn to Durham. One suggestion is he did not trust his ill-disciplined and mutinous troops, but morale in the rest of the army now collapsed, forcing Charles to make peace. The only other significant action of the war was the siege of Edinburgh Castle, held by the Royalist commander Sir Patrick Ruthven, who had previously served with Leslie in the Swedish army. Blockaded since the end of May, starvation forced him to surrender in September.

== Aftermath ==
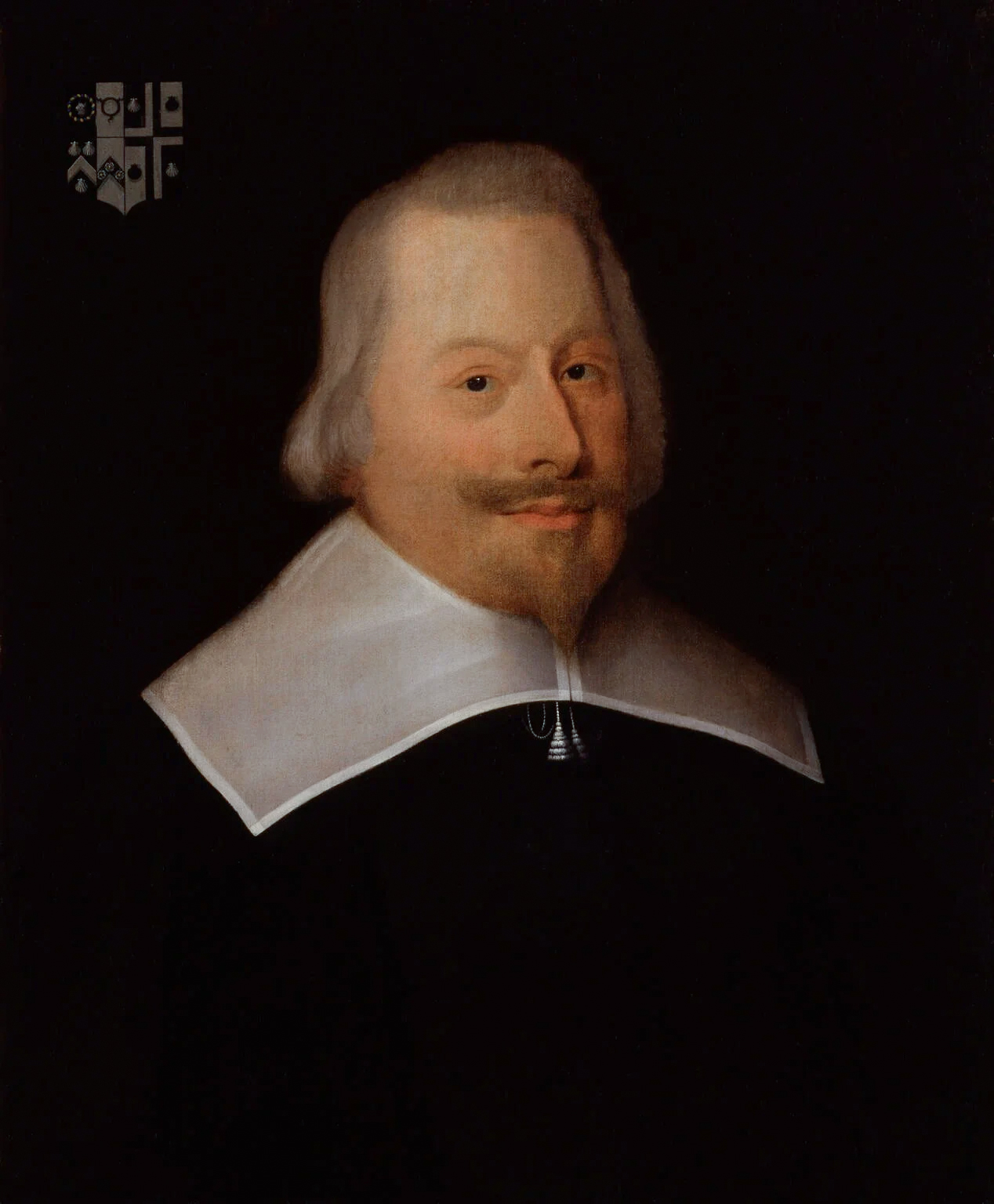
John Pym, leader of the English Parliamentary opposition; defeat forced Charles to recall Parliament in November 1640

Under the truce negotiated in October 1640, the Scots were paid £850 per day and allowed to occupy Northumberland and County Durham until peace terms had been finalised. Many believed this arrangement was secretly agreed between the Parliamentary opposition and the Scots, since it allowed them to maintain pressure on London by controlling the export of coal from Newcastle, while only Parliament could levy the taxes needed to pay the occupation costs. The so-called Long Parliament that assembled in November 1640 asserted its power by executing Strafford in May 1641. By August, the Treaty of London was signed and the Scottish army finally evacuated Northern England.

While defeat forced Charles to call a Parliament he could not get rid of, the Irish Rebellion of 1641 was arguably more significant in the struggle that led to war in August 1642. Both he and Parliament agreed on the need to suppress the revolt but neither trusted the other with control of the army raised to do so, and it was this tension that was the proximate cause of the First English Civil War. Victory confirmed Covenanter control of government and the Kirk, and Scottish policy now focused on securing these achievements. The 1643 Solemn League and Covenant was driven by concern over the implications for Scotland if Parliament were defeated; like Charles, the Covenanters sought political power through the creation of a unified church of Scotland and England, only one that was Presbyterian, rather than Episcopalian.

However, success in the Bishops' Wars meant they overestimated their military capacity and ability to enforce this objective. Unlike Scotland, Presbyterians were a minority within the Church of England, while religious Independents opposed any state church, let alone one dictated by the Scots. One of their most prominent opponents was Oliver Cromwell, who claimed he would fight rather than agree to such an outcome. Many of the political radicals known as the Levellers, and much of the New Model Army, belonged to Independent congregations; by 1646, the Scots and their English allies viewed them as a greater threat than Charles. Defeat in the 1648 Second English Civil War resulted in Charles I's execution, while a failed invasion of England intended to restore his son in the Anglo-Scottish war (1650–1652) was followed by Scotland's incorporation into the Commonwealth, a union made on English terms.

== Sources ==
- Bannerman, James (1868b). The church of Christ: a treatise on the nature, powers, ordinances, discipline, and government of the Christian church. Vol. 2. Edinburgh: T. T. Clark.
- Caldwell, David (2019). Edinburgh Castle Under Siege, 1639–1745. National Museums of Scotland.
- Cressy, David (2015). "The Blindness of Charles I". Huntington Library Quarterly. 78 (4): 637–656. doi:10.1353/hlq.2015.0031. ISSN 1544-399X.
- Fissel, Mark (1994). The Bishops' Wars: Charles I's Campaigns against Scotland, 1638–1640. Cambridge University Press. ISBN 0521466865.
- Gericke, Bradley T (2001). Civil Wars in Britain; 1640–1646 (PDF) (PhD). U.S. Army Command and General Staff College. Archived (PDF) from the original on 9 March 2014.
- Harris, Tim (2014). Rebellion: Britain's First Stuart Kings, 1567–1642. OUP. ISBN 978-0199209002.
- Kaplan, Lawrence (1979). "Charles I's Flight to the Scots". Albion: A Quarterly Journal Concerned with British Studies. 11 (3): 207–223. doi:10.2307/4048612. JSTOR 4048612.
- Kishlansky, Mark (2005). "Charles I: A Case of Mistaken Identity". Past and Present (189): 41–80. doi:10.1093/pastj/gti027. JSTOR 3600749.
- Mackie, JD; Lenman, Bruce; Parker, Geoffrey (1986). A History of Scotland. Hippocrene Books. ISBN 978-0880290401.
- McDonald, Alan (1998). The Jacobean Kirk, 1567–1625: Sovereignty, Polity and Liturgy. Routledge. ISBN 185928373X.
- Melville, James (2015) [1842]. Pitcairn, Robert (ed.). The Autobiography and Diary of Mr. James Melville, with a Continuation of the Diary. Arkose Press. ISBN 978-1343621848.
- Pearce, Dominic (2015). Henrietta Maria. Amberley. ISBN 978-1-4456-4555-1.
- Plant, David. "Scottish National Covenant". BCW Project. Archived from the original on 18 July 2020.
- Rees, John (2016). The Leveller Revolution. Verso. ISBN 978-1784783907.
- Royle, Trevor (2006) [2004]. Civil War: The Wars of the Three Kingdoms 1638–1660. Abacus. ISBN 978-0-349-11564-1.
- Stephen, Jeffrey (2010). "Scottish Nationalism and Stuart Unionism". Journal of British Studies. 49 (1, Scottish Special). doi:10.1086/644534. S2CID 144730991.
- Stevenson, David (2003) [1973]. Scottish Revolution, 1637–44: Triumph of the Covenanters. David & Charles. ISBN 0715363026.
- Thomson, Oliver (2018). Zealots; How a group of Scottish conspirators unleashed half a century of war in Britain. Amberley. ISBN 978-1445677958.
- Waureghen, Sarah (2009). "Covenanter Propaganda and Conceptualizations of the Public during the Bishops Wars, 1638–1640". The Historical Journal. 52 (1): 63–86. doi:10.1017/S0018246X08007310. ISSN 0018-246X. JSTOR 40264158.
- Wilson, Peter (2012) [2009]. The Thirty Years War: Europe's Tragedy. Belknap Press. ISBN 978-0674062313.
- Woolrych, Austin (2009). Britain in revolution: 1625–1660. Oxford Univ. Press. ISBN 978-0-19-927268-6.
