= James Sibbald =

Church of Scotland minister

James Sibbald (c. 1595 – 1647) was a Scottish Royalist Presbyterian minister and theologian.

== Life ==
James Sibbald was of an ancient family in the Mearns. His birth, about 1595, may be inferred from his being on ordination trials with the presbytery of Deer on 28 October 1613. He matriculated at Marischal College, Aberdeen in 1614. He graduated MA in 1618 and he became a regent, and prelected on philosophy. In 1626 he was admitted to the first charge in St. Nicholas' Church, Aberdeen. He graduated B.D. at Marischal College on 14 October 1630, and before 1637 received the degree of D.D. from the two universities of Marischal College and King's College.

His first appearance in ecclesiastical politics is in connection with the unifying schemes of John Durie (1596–1680). By advice of Archbishop Spotiswood, Durie had written to Aberdeen divines, seeking their opinion on the points of dispute between the Lutherans and the Reformed.

On 20 February 1637 Sibbald and five other Aberdeen doctors, headed by John Forbes (1593–1648), gave it as their judgment that Lutherans and Reformed agreed in those points on which the ancient church had been of one opinion. The harmonising attempt was approved by Robert Baillie, D.D.; by Samuel Rutherford it was denounced as a design for "reconciliation with popery".

On the arrival in Aberdeen (20 July 1638) of the deputation, charged with the task of procuring adhesion to the "national covenant" of 28 February (drafted by Alexander Henderson, (1583?–1646)), the same six doctors, with the temporising adhesion of William Guild, presented further "demands," questioning the lawfulness of the covenant. Answers, replies, further answers and "duplies," brought the negotiation to a deadlock. Sibbald had been elected to the general assembly which opened at Glasgow on 21 November. He did not attend.

On 28 March 1639, four days before the reduction of Aberdeen by the covenanting forces under Montrose, he sailed for Berwick with Robert Baron (1593?–1639), other leaders of his party, and a small armed force, for the service of the king. They were coldly received. Sibbald returned to Aberdeen in August, and resumed his ministry on 13 October, practically accepting the situation, but resolutely declining to subscribe the "national covenant."

On 22 December he admonished his parishioners not to keep Christmas Day, this being forbidden by ecclesiastical authority (Act of Assembly, 10 December 1638).

On 24 May 1640 he was silenced by commission of assembly; on 7 July he was suspended till the meeting of assembly.

On 6 August he was deposed by the general assembly meeting at Aberdeen. In addition to his refusal of the covenant, he was charged with Arminianism and with doctrines tending to popery, a charge partly grounded on his circulation of the (unpublished) writings of William Forbes. Under examination, he maintained the regeneration of all baptised infants; and while admitting the pope to be antichrist, he "knew not whether a greater antichrist would arise after him." His books and papers were seized, but returned to him.

In October he again sailed for England, but returned to Aberdeen at the beginning of 1641, having received no encouragement from the king. He made his way to Ireland, and obtained some ministerial charge in Dublin. He was probably the "Ja. Sybold" who joined (August 1646) in the address to Ormonde, thanking him for "the free exercise of the true reformed religion according to the liturgy and canons of the church," and who signed (9 July 1647) the "declaration" maintaining that the directory was without royal authority, and seeking permission "to use the Book of Common Prayer."

Grub doubts whether he was the Dr. Sibbald who attended Hamilton on the scaffold in Palace Yard, Westminster (9 March 1649), on the ground that the divines then in attendance are described as presbyterians. But this term is not inapplicable to Sibbald, a Scottish churchman, strongly attached to primitive doctrine, but accepting the ecclesiastical arrangements made by lawful authority.

Ten years after leaving Aberdeen he died in Dublin of the plague, in 1647.

He married Elizabeth Nicolson, and had issue. The Scottish parliament on 21 June 1661 granted £200 to his widow and children.

== Works ==
- Theses Theologicæ de primatu B. Petri, Aberdeen, 1627, 4to.
- Holinesse to the Lord (a sermon in the "Funerals" of Bishop Patrick Forbes), Aberdeen, 1635, 4to; reprinted, Spottiswoode Society, 1845, 8vo.
- Diverse Select Sermons,"Aberdeen, 1658, 4to (fifteen sermons). (Posthumous)

== Notes and references ==
- This article incorporates text from a publication now in the public domain: Gordon, Alexander (1885). "Sibbald, James (1590?-1650?)". In Lee, Sidney (ed.). Dictionary of National Biography. Vol. 52. London: Smith, Elder & Co. pp. 177–178.

=== Sources ===
- Wells, R. P. (2020). "Sibbald, James". Oxford Dictionary of National Biography. Oxford Dictionary of National Biography (online ed.). Oxford: Oxford University Press. doi:10.1093/ref:odnb/25494. (Subscription or UK public library membership required.)
