= Aberdeen doctors =

The Aberdeen doctors or doctors of Aberdeen were six divines working at Marischal College and King's College in Aberdeen, Scotland in the seventeenth century. Until 1635, they enjoyed the leadership of Patrick Forbes, Bishop of Aberdeen. They are distinguished not only for their positions at Aberdeen, but also by their irenicist opposition to the National Covenant of 1638. Their adherence to Episcopacy and their support for the Articles of the Assembly at Perth (1618), which prescribed several English forms of worship, form the backdrop of their opposition to the Presbyterian Covenanters.

== History ==
When Patrick Forbes was consecrated Bishop of Aberdeen in 1618, he endowed a chair of divinity in each Aberdeen college. He revived the awarding of degrees in divinity which earlier Protestants had suppressed as prideful or as redolent of the Roman Catholic title Doctor of the Church. The early recipients of the Doctor of Divinity who stayed on to teach at the colleges became known as the "Aberdeen doctors".

John Dury wrote to the doctors seeking their opinion on the points of dispute between the Lutherans and the Calvinists. Their reply of 20 February 1637 was supported by Robert Baillie but opposed by Samuel Rutherford. On 20 July 1638, a deputation seeking Aberdeen's adhesion to February's National Covenant arrived, comprising the Earl of Montrose, Lord Cupar, the Master of Forbes, and Sir Thomas Burnett, Laird of Leyes representing the nobility; and Alexander Henderson, David Dickson, and Andrew Cant, the ministry. The doctors were prepared to adhere provided satisfactory answers were given to 14 written questions, termed "demands". The Covenanter ministers' "answers" were submitted the following day, prompting "replies" from the doctors and "second answers" from the Covenanters, who then left the town. The doctors issued further replies which they called "duplies", which went unanswered. All the texts were quickly printed and widely circulated and debated.

The doctors' obduracy contributed to the First Bishops' War of 1639 in which the Covenanters sought the submission of Aberdeen.

== List ==
The six doctors who participated in the 1638 disputation were:

- William Leslie, Principal of King's College, leader after death of Bishop Forbes in 1635
- John Forbes of Corse, theologian at King's College and son of Bishop Forbes
- Alexander Scroggie, scholar of King's College, Minister in Old Aberdeen
- Alexander Ross, Scholar of King's College, Minister in Aberdeen
- Robert Baron, Professor of Divinity at Marischal, Minister in Aberdeen
- James Sibbald, Professor of Natural Philosophy at Marischal, Minister in Aberdeen

As well as Bishop Patrick Forbes, two other notable Aberdeen divines were associated with the six doctors:

- William Guild, who subscribed to the six doctors' initial demands but then switched to the side of the Covenanters
- William Forbes, principal of Marischal until made Bishop of Edinburgh in 1634, months before his death
