= James Hannay =

James Hannay may refer to:

- James Hannay (writer) (1827–1873), Scottish novelist, journalist and diplomat
- James Hannay (1842–1910), Canadian lawyer and newspaper editor
- James Hannay (minister) (c. 1595–1661), Scottish clergyman
- James Ballantyne Hannay (1855–1931), Scottish chemist
- George A. Birmingham, pen name of James Owen Hannay (1865–1950), Irish clergyman and novelist
