= Negative Confession =

1581 document adopted in defence of the Scottish Church

The Negative Confession (Latin: Confessio Negativa), sometimes known as the King's Confession, is a confession of faith issued by King James VI of Scotland on 2 March 1581.

== Background ==
In 1580 Scottish Protestants feared the influence of Counter-Reformation forces in Scotland and were suspicious of King James's Catholic favourite, Ésme Stewart. They suspected that Catholics had obtained a papal dispensation to allow them to subscribe to the Scots Confession of 1560. David Calderwood later asserted that "many masked Papists subscribed the old Confession deceitfully". In order to allay these fears and demonstrate his fidelity to Protestantism, James commissioned John Craig to draft a confession of faith that would appeal to Protestants and which no Catholic would be able to sign. Robert Baillie later wrote:

In the year 1580 some prime courtiers and others truly popish in their heart, yet for their own ends was content to dissemble and to abjure popery with their owne equivocations and mentall reservations, the King, desiring to stop all starting holes, caused Mr Craige, the pastor of his familie, to draw up a confession of every particular rejecting expressly the most of the Romish errors.

The document became known as the Negative Confession because it defined what the Church of Scotland was against rather than declaring those doctrines which it approved. However, the Confession did include an affirmation of the Scots Confession.

== The Negative Confession in the royal household ==
The Confession was first subscribed by the King and his courtiers (including Ésme Stewart), hence the name King's Confession. The document was drawn up by the minister John Craig and signed on 28 January 1582.

== Reception ==
According to David Calderwood, "almost all citizens of all ranks followed" James in subscribing to the Confession. The General Assembly of the Church of Scotland approved of it and declared it "a true and Christian Confession to be agreed unto by such as truly profess Christ and his true religion". The Church also received orders to prosecute "refusers" and university graduates were required to subscribe to it. The Confession was frequently renewed throughout Scotland and John Craig included it in his popular Catechism.

In 1637 Charles I ordered the use of a new prayer book in Scotland, which was similar to the Anglican Book of Common Prayer. This was met with widespread resistance and many Scots believed that Charles's Archbishop of Canterbury, William Laud, was trying to re-introduce Catholic practices. Scottish Church leaders took the Negative Confession, with its strident anti-Catholicism, as their inspiration in the campaign against Charles's ecclesiastical policies. In 1638 Archibald Johnston and Alexander Henderson reprinted the Confession in the National Covenant, which was signed across Scotland.

In 1831 Edward Irving said the Confession "is one of the most nervous protestations against the Papacy that was ever penned". The 19th-century Protestant theologian Philip Schaff called it "the most fiercely anti-Popish of all Confessions". In 1902 W. L. Mathieson spoke of "that exhaustive execration of all things papal which the Presbyterians of the next century were content to revive as the confession of their faith". Hugh Pope in the Catholic Encyclopedia described it as the "most violent condemnation of Papistry that ever issued from a Calvinistic pen".

== Editions ==
- The Scots Confession, 1560, and Negative Confession, 1581, introduction by G. D. Henderson (Edinburgh: Church of Scotland, Committee on Publications, 1937).
- The text of the Confession is reprinted in A Source Book of Scottish History, Volume 3: 1567 to 1707, eds. W. C. Dickinson and G. Donaldson (London: Nelson, 1954), p. 32.
