= William Guild =

Scottish minister, academic and writer

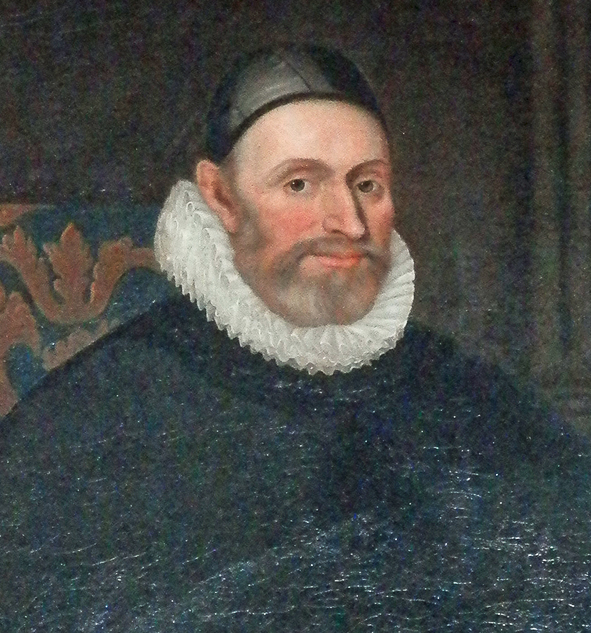
William Guild

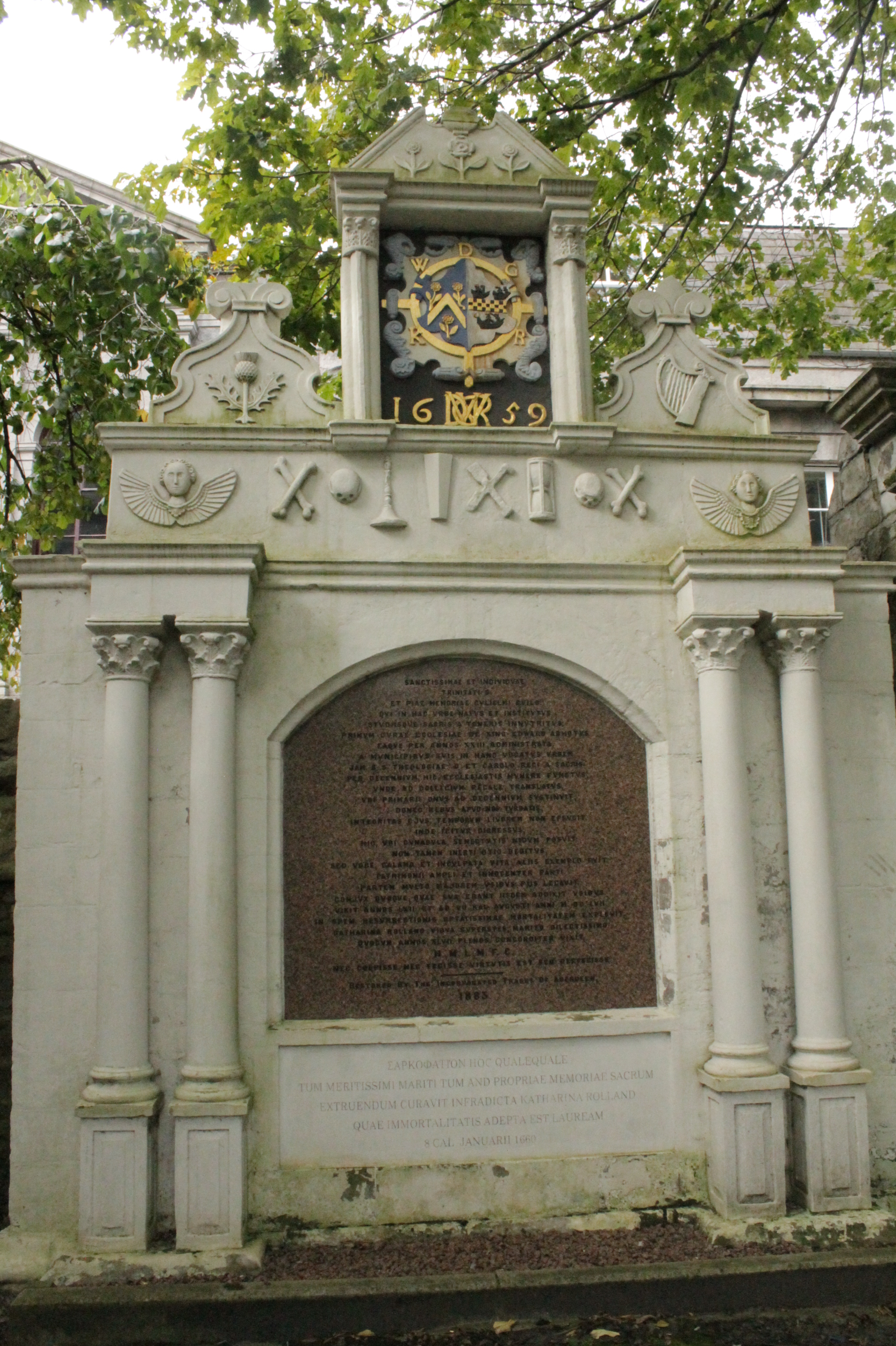
The grave of Rev Dr William Guild, Kirk of St Nicholas in Aberdeen

William Guild (1586–1657) was a Scottish Presbyterian minister, academic and theological writer.

== Life ==
He was the second son of Marjorie (born Donaldson) and Matthew Guild, a wealthy armourer and hammerman of Aberdeen, and Deacon of the Guild of Hammermen and his wife, Marion Robertson. William had three sisters including the philanthropist Jean Guild who was baptised in 1573.

He was born in Aberdeen, and was educated at Marischal College graduating MA around 1602. He received licence to preach as a Church of Scotland minister by the Presbytery of Aberdeen in May 1605, and in 1608 was ordained minister of the parish of King Edward in Aberdeenshire. Two years later his wealth was increased by his marriage with Katherine Rolland or Rowen of Disblair, Aberdeenshire. In 1617, during the visit of James I to Scotland, Guild was in Edinburgh, and was a member of the assembly which met in the music school of that city, and protested for the liberties of the kirk; the temper of the king was thought to make it dangerous to sign the protestation, but Guild was one of the fifty-five who subscribed. While in Edinburgh he made the acquaintance of Bishop Lancelot Andrewes, then with the king, and to him (in 1620) he dedicated his best-known work, Moses Unvailed.

Guild was made a chaplain to Charles I, by the support of Peter Young. Soon afterwards he received the degree of D.D., then almost unknown in Scotland. He was translated to the second charge at Aberdeen in 1631, where he joined the clergy in supporting episcopacy. In 1632 he was created the first Patron of the Seven Incorporated Trades of Aberdeen and held this role until 1657 when he was succeeded by Rev John Menzies.

In 1635 he was one of the preachers at the funeral of Bishop Patrick Forbes, his diocesan. The National Covenant was viewed at Aberdeen with disfavour, and the commissioners sent to press its acceptance on the city were met by the Aberdeen Doctors for the university, and the town ministers, with a series of questions disputing its lawfulness. Guild signed these questions, but soon subscribed the Covenant, though with three limitations: he would not condemn the Articles of Perth, though agreeing for the peace of the church to forbear the practice of them; he would not condemn episcopal government absolutely; and he reserved his duty to the king.

Guild went as commissioner to the Glasgow assembly of 1638, which deposed the Scottish bishops. In March 1640 an army approached Aberdeen to enforce unconditional subscription of the Covenant. Guild for a time took refuge in Holland, but soon returned, and administered the communion according to the Presbyterian form on 3 November. In August 1640 the covenanters expelled Dr. William Leslie, and appointed Guild principal of King's College, Aberdeen, in preference to Robert Baillie.

Guild retired from his position as minister, preaching for the last time on 27 June 1641. He supported the dismantling of the bishop's palace at Old Aberdeen and the purging of the cathedral and the college chapel of ornaments, but Andrew Cant (then all-powerful at Aberdeen), thought Guild was "luke-warm", and at the visitation to King's College by Oliver Cromwell's military commissioners in 1651 Guild was deprived of office.

Guild was a benevolent man; he purchased the convent of the Trinity Friars at Aberdeen and endowed it as a hospital, for which he received a royal charter in 1633. His widow left an endowment to maintain poor students, and for other charitable purposes. He died at Aberdeen on 25 July August, and was remembered there for his benefactions to its public institutions; there is a William Guild Building in Aberdeen University.

He is buried against the west boundary wall of the Kirk of St Nicholas in Aberdeen. The huge monument bears the date 1659: the year of the death of his wife, Katharine Rolland. It was restored in the late 19th century when the original central marble inscription tablet was replaced with red granite.

== Works ==
Guild wrote:

- The New Sacrifice of Christian Incense, or the True Entrie to the Tree of Life, and Gracious Gate of Glorious Paradise, London, 1608.
- The Only Way to Salvation, or the Life and Soul of True Religion, London, 1608.
- Moses Vnuailed … whereunto is added the Harmony of All the Prophets (the latter, with separate title-page dated 1619, dedicated to Peter Young), London, 1620, 1626, 1658, Glasgow 1701, and Edinburgh, 1755, 1839. This work made Guild an early Protestant adapter of the tradition of figural hermeneutics. It was then followed by Thomas Taylor (Christ Revealed, 1635), and Samuel Mather's sermons of the 1660s.
- Issachar's Asse … or the Uniting of Churches, Aberdeen, 1622.
- Three Rare Monuments of Antiquitie, or Bertram, a Frenchman, Ælfricus, an Englishman, and Maurus, a Scotsman: all stronglie convincing that grosse errour of transubstantiation. Translated and compacted by W. Guild, Aberdeen, 1624. Translations from Ratramnus, Ælfric of Eynsham and Hrabanus Maurus.
- Ignis Fatuus, or the Elf-fire of Purgatorie, with a latter Annex, London, 1625.
- Popish Glorying in Antiquity turned to their Shame, Aberdeen, 1626.
- A Compend of the Controversies of Religion, Aberdeen, 1629.
- Limbo's Battery, or an Answer to a Popish Pamphlet concerning Christ's Descent into Hell, Aberdeen, 1630.
- The Humble Addresse both of Church and Poore … for the Vniting of Churches and the Ruine of Hospitalls, Aberdeen, 1633. The first part is a reprint of Issachar's Asse.
- Sermon at the Funeral of Bishop Forbes, 1635.
- Trueth Triumphant, or the conversion of … F. Cupif from Poperie. … Faithfully translated into English by W. Guild, Aberdeen, 1637.
- An Antidote against Poperie; one of three treatises printed together at Aberdeen, 1639; its ascription to Guild is doubtful.
- The Christian's Passover, Aberdeen, 1639.
- The Old … in opposition to the New Roman Catholik, Aberdeen, 1649.
- Antichrist … in his true Colours, or the Pope of Rome proven to bee that Man of Sinne, Aberdeen, 1655.
- The Sealed Book opened, being an explication of the Revelations, Aberdeen, 1656.
- Answer to "The Touchstone of the Reformed Gospel", Aberdeen, 1656.
- The Noveltie of Poperie discovered and chieflie proved by Romanists out of themselves, Aberdeen, 1656.
- Love's Entercours between the Lamb and his Bride, or A Clear Explication … of the Song of Solomon, London, 1658.
- The Throne of David, an Exposition of II Samuel, published at Oxford, 1659, by John Owen, to whom it was to have been dedicated, and to whom the manuscript was sent by Guild's widow.

== Notes ==
Attribution

- This article incorporates text from a publication now in the public domain: Stephen, Leslie; Lee, Sidney, eds. (1890). "Guild, William". Dictionary of National Biography. Vol. 23. London: Smith, Elder & Co.
