= Jenny Geddes =

Scottish protester (c. 1600 – c. 1660)

- Incident in St Giles' Cathedral
- Church: St. Giles' Cathedral

Personal details
- Born: Various names and spellings Jenny Geddes or Janot Geddes c. 1600
- Died: c. 1660 (aged 59–60)
- Denomination: Presbyterian
- Spouse: Robert Mean?

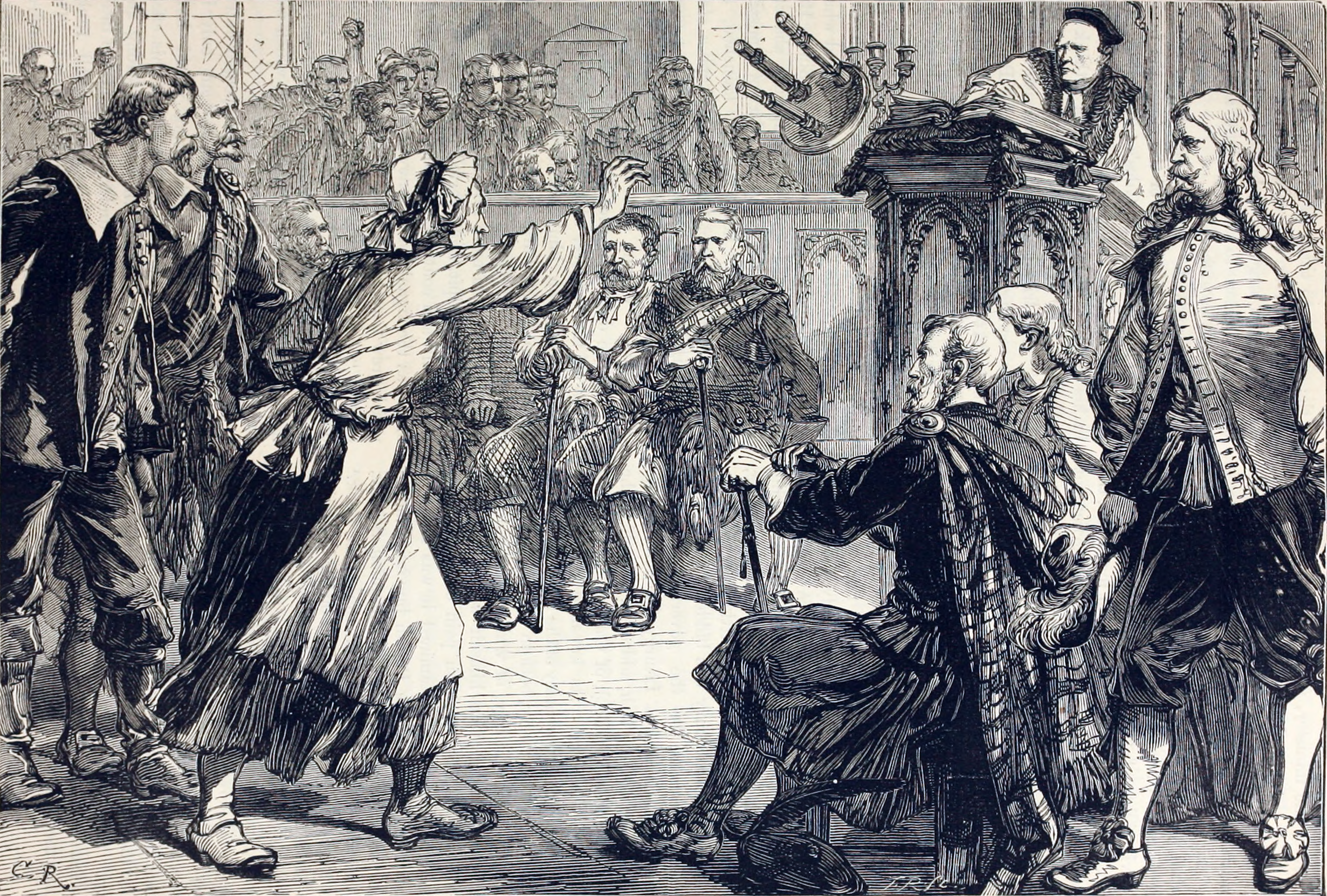
Janet Geddes from A History of Protestantism

Janet "Jenny" Geddes (c. 1600 – c. 1660) was a Scottish market-trader in Edinburgh who is alleged to have thrown a stool at the head of the minister in St Giles' Cathedral in objection to the first public use of the Church of Scotland's revised version of the Book of Common Prayer, the 1637 Scottish Prayer Book. The act is reputed to have sparked the riot that led to the Wars of the Three Kingdoms, which included the English Civil War.

== Background ==
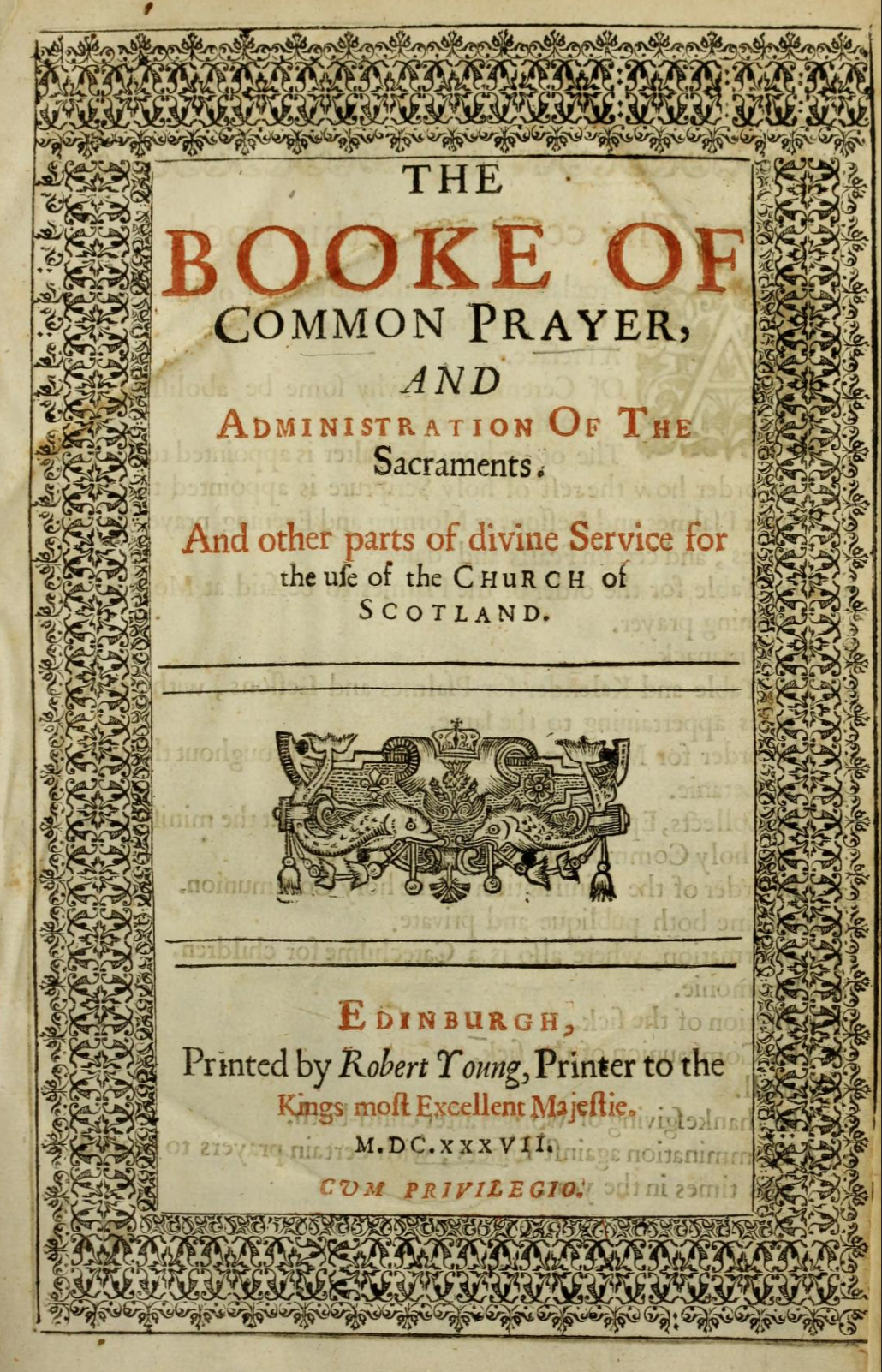
Title page of the 1637 Scottish Book of Common Prayer

Since the early years of the 17th century, the Church of Scotland had been established as an episcopal church on the same basis as the Church of England, but was far more Puritan both in doctrine and practice. In 1633, King Charles I came to St Giles' to have his Scottish coronation service, using the full Anglican rites, accompanied by William Laud, his new Archbishop of Canterbury. In the years that followed, he began to consider ways of introducing Anglican-style church services in Scotland. The king arranged a commission to draw up a prayer book suitable for Scotland, and in 1637 an Edinburgh printer produced:

The BOOKE OF Common Prayer
AND Administration Of The Sacraments:
And other parts of divine Service
for the use of the CHURCH OF SCOTLAND.

These developments met with widespread opposition.

== Incident ==
The first use of the prayer book was in St Giles' on Sunday, 23 July 1637, when James Hannay, Dean of Edinburgh, began to read the Collects, part of the prescribed service, and Geddes, a market-woman or street-seller, threw her stool straight at the minister's head. Some sources describe it as a "fald stool" or a "creepie-stool", while others claim that it was a larger, three-legged cuttie-stool. As she hurled the stool she is reported to have yelled: "De'il gie you colic, the wame o' ye, fause thief; daur ye say Mass in my lug?" meaning "The Devil give you colic! The hide of you! (lit. "the belly of you") False thief! You dare say the Mass in my ear?"

This was the start of a general tumult with much of the congregation shouting abuse and throwing Bibles, stools, sticks and stones. John Prebble reports the phrase "Daur ye say Mass in my lug?" as being addressed to a gentleman in the congregation who murmured a dutiful response to the liturgy, getting thumped with a Bible for his pains, and describes Jenny as one of a number of "waiting-women" who were paid to arrive early and sit on their folding stools to hold a place for their patrons. Officers summoned by the Provost ejected the rioters, who, for the rest of the service, stayed to hammer at the doors and throw stones at the windows.

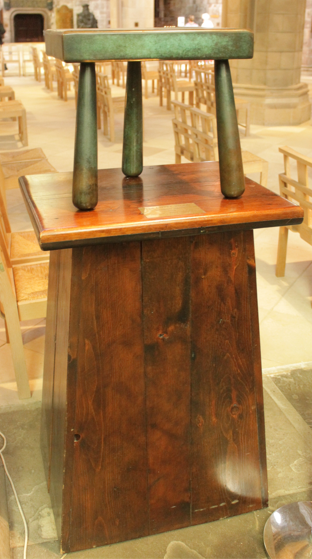
Monument to Geddes, St Giles Cathedral

More serious rioting in the streets (and in other cities) followed, and the provost and magistrates were besieged in the City Chambers, to the extent that it became necessary to negotiate with the Edinburgh mob. At the suggestion of the Lord Advocate, Thomas Hope, it appointed a committee known as the Tables to negotiate with the Privy Council. Characteristically, Charles turned down the Tables' demands for withdrawal of the Anglican liturgy and more riots ensued with talk of civil war. This led to widespread signing of the National Covenant in February 1638, with its defiance of any attempt to introduce innovations like the prayer book that had not first been subject to the scrutiny of Parliament and the general assembly of the church. In November of the same year, the bishops and archbishops were formally expelled from the Church of Scotland, which was then established on a full Presbyterian basis. Charles reacted by launching the Bishops' Wars, thus beginning the Wars of Three Kingdoms.

In the aftermath of the riots definitive evidence is hard to come by, and some doubt if Geddes started the fight or if she even existed, but she remains a part of Edinburgh tradition and has long had a memorial in St Giles. The sculpture that was added recently shows a three-legged cuttie-stool rather than a folding stool. Lord Barrett of Newburgh wrote of the riot on 29 August 1637, "I hear they were by the women beaten out of the church with their little stools (which it seems their custom is to sit upon)."

Around 1787, Robert Burns named his mare after Geddes and wrote amusingly of this faithful horse.

== Commemoration ==
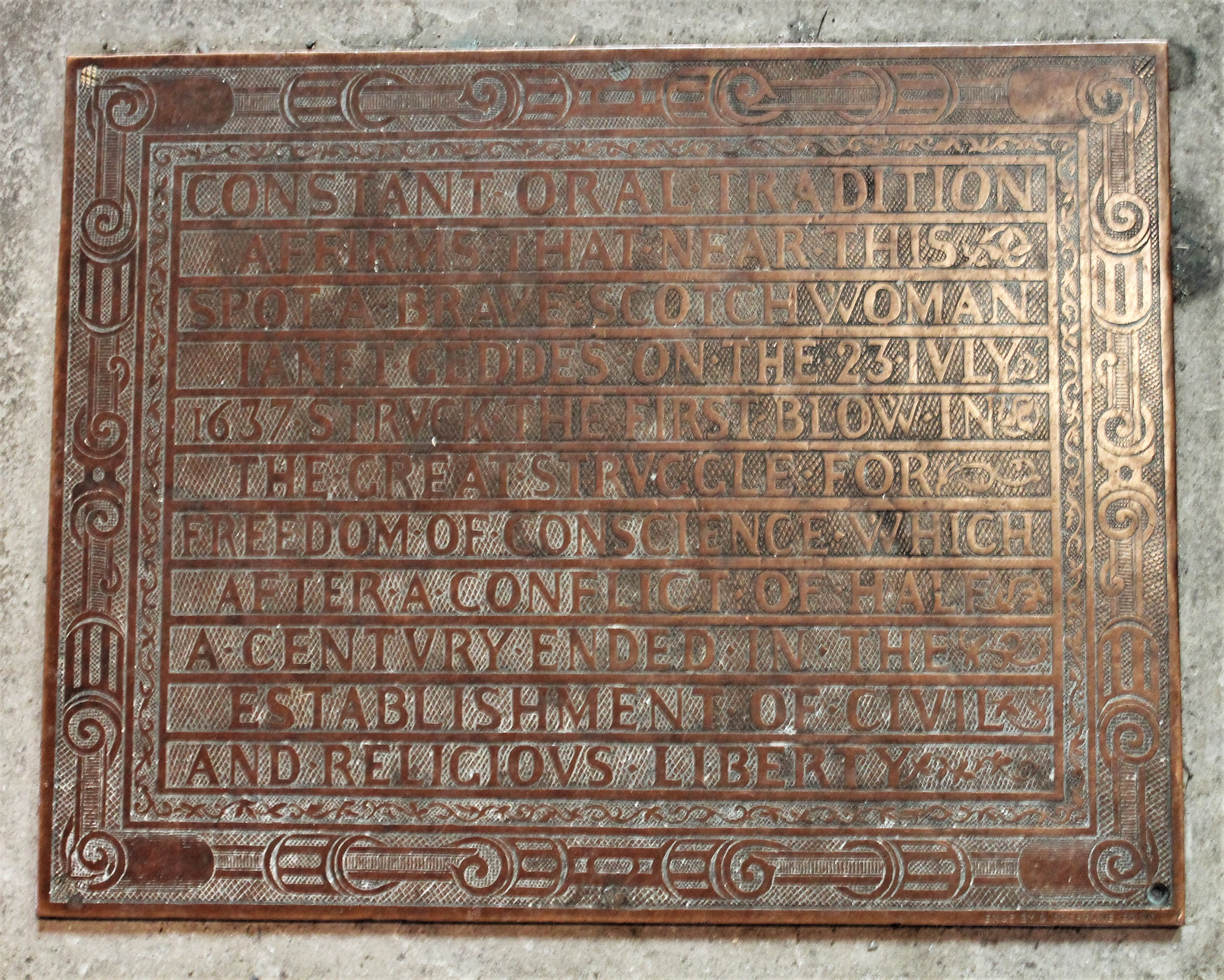
Geddes plaque

In 1886 a plaque was erected to Geddes's memory in St Giles' Cathedral. It was paid for by the philanthropist Robert Halliday Gunning.

== See also ==
- Bishops' Wars
- Book of Common Order
- Prayer Book Rebellion in the West of England
- Religion in the United Kingdom
