= Robert Baron (theologian) =

Scottish theologian

Saint Robert Baron DDiv

Aberdeen Doctor
- Born: 1596; Kinnaird, Gowrie, Kingdom of Scotland
- Died: 1639; Berwick-upon-Tweed, Kingdom of England
- Honored in: Anglican Communion
- Feast: 28 March

Robert Baron (1596–1639) was a Scottish Presbyterian minister, theologian and one of the so-called Aberdeen doctors. He is commemorated in the Calendar of saints of the Scottish Episcopal Church on 28 March.

== Life ==
Born in 1596 at Kinnaird, Gowrie, he was the younger son of John Baron of Kinnaird. After graduating from the University of St Andrews in 1613, he became a teacher of Philosophy there until, in 1619, he entered the ministry and took charge of parish of Keith. In the latter charge his predecessor had been the famous Patrick Forbes.

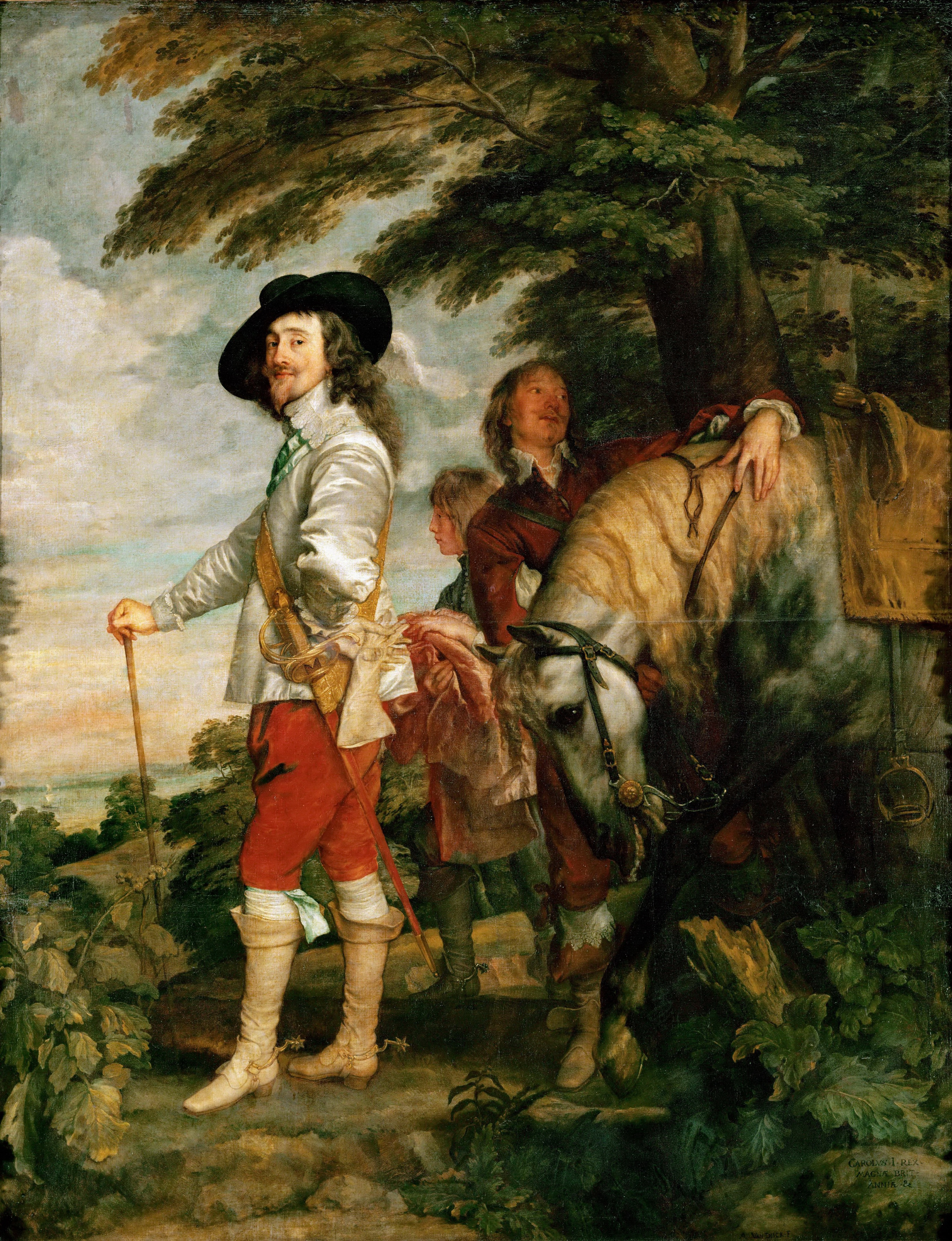
Robert Baron was a loyal supporter of King Charles I, (pictured) painted around 1635.

He held this position until 27 October 1624, when he was translated to Greyfriars parish, Aberdeen. In the following year, on 21 December 1625, he was appointed as the first Professor of Divinity at Marischal College, a post he would hold simultaneously with his charge at Greyfriars. In 1627, he earned his Doctorate in Divinity, the thesis for which began a long theological dispute with George Turnbull, a Scottish Jesuit theologian.

Baron was a firm supporter of the Anglicanising religious policies of Kings James VI and Charles I. He opposed the National Covenant of 1638 both through preaching and writings, including three tracts that were co-authored with John Forbes, both of whom, along with four others, were referred to by the Presbyterians as "the Aberdeen doctors". In this year Baron was nominated to be Bishop of Orkney, but was unable to receive consecration. He fled to England in the Spring of 1639 to avoid being forced to sign the National Covenant. He was on his way back to Scotland later in the year, but fell ill and died at Berwick-upon-Tweed on 19 August 1639.

Baron married once, to Jean née Gibson, a girl from Strathisla in Aberdeenshire. They had four children. Baron left a great number of published and unpublished works. After his death the Covenanters forced his widow to allow them to see his papers, after which they accused him of Arminianism. Following the Restoration, the crown paid his family £200 in reward for his loyalty to King Charles I.
