= Irenicism =

Attempts to unify Christian apologetics with reason

In Christian theology, irenicism refers to attempts to unify Christian apologetical systems by using reason as an essential attribute. The word is derived from the Greek word ειρήνη (eirene) meaning peace. It is a concept related to a communal theology and opposed to committed differences, which can cause unavoidable tension or friction, and is rooted in the ideals of pacifism. Those who affiliate themselves with irenicism identify the importance of unity in the Christian Church and declare the common bond of all Christians under Christ.

== Erasmus and his influence ==
Desiderius Erasmus was a Christian humanist and reformer, in the sense of checking clerical abuses, honoring inner piety, considering reason as meaningful in theology as in other ways. He also promoted the notion that Christianity must remain under one church, both theologically and literally, under the body of the Catholic Church. Since his time, irenicism has postulated removing conflicts between different Christian creeds by way of mediation and gradual amalgamation of theological differences. Erasmus wrote extensively on topics related generally to peace, and an irenic approach is part of the texture of his thought, both on theology and in relation to politics:

Despite the frequency and severity of polemics directed against him, Erasmus continued ... to practice a kind of discourse that is critical and ironic, yet modest and irenic.

Certain important irenic contributions from Erasmus helped to further the humanist consideration of themes of peace and religious conciliation; these included the Inquisitio de fide (1524), arguing against the papal opinion that Martin Luther was a heretic, and De sarcienda ecclesiae concordia (1533). Erasmus had close associates sharing his views (Julius von Pflug, Christoph von Stadion, Jakob Ziegler and Jan Łaski) and was followed on the Catholic side by George Cassander and Georg Witzel.

The influence of Erasmus was, however, limited, by the virtual exclusion of his works from countries such as France, from 1525, at least in the open; though they did appear in numerous forms and translations. James Hutton speaks of "the surreptitious manner in which Erasmus' peace propaganda reached the French public."

Franciscus Junius published in 1593 Le paisible Chrestien arguing for religious tolerance and Ecumenism. He addressed Philip II of Spain, using arguments taken from the French politique statesman Michel de l'Hôpital and reformer Sebastian Castellio.

== 17th century: Catholics and Protestants ==
Irenic movements were influential in the 17th century, and irenicism, for example in the form of Gottfried Leibniz's efforts to reunite Catholics and Protestants, is in some ways a forerunner to the more modern ecumenical movements.

The 1589 Examen pacifique de la doctrine des Huguenots by Henry Constable proved influential, for example on Christopher Potter and William Forbes. Richard Montagu admired Cassander and Andreas Fricius. The 1628 Syllabus aliquot synodorum was a bibliography of the literature of religious concord, compiled by Jean Hotman, Marquis de Villers-St-Paul, decades earlier, and seen into print by Hugo Grotius using the pseudonym "Theodosius Irenaeus," with a preface by Matthias Bernegger.

It was typical enough, however, for moderate and even irenical writers on the Catholic side to find in this period that their arguments were turned back against Catholicism. This style of arguing developed in England from Thomas Bell and particularly Thomas Morton. It led to Thomas James mining Marcantonio de Dominis and Paolo Sarpi, and making efforts to claim Witzel for the Protestant tradition; to the arguments of Gallicanism being welcomed but also treated as particularly insidious; and an irenist such as Francis a Sancta Clara being attacked strongly by firm Calvinists. The handful of Protestant writers who were convinced in their irenic approach to Catholics included William Covell and Thomas Dove.

== 17th century: Protestant divisions ==
James I of England thought that the Bible translation he commissioned might effect some reconciliation between the English Protestant religious factions, and prove an irenicon. The Greek ἐιρηνικόν (eirenikon) or peace proposal is also seen as irenicum in its Latin version.

An irenic literature developed, relating to divisions within Protestantism, particularly in the twenty years after the Peace of Westphalia. Examples marked out by title are:

- David Pareus, Irenicum sive de unione et synodo Evangelicorum (1614)
- John Forbes, Irenicum Amatoribus Veritatis et Pacis in Ecclesia Scotiana (Aberdeen, 1629)
- Jeremiah Burroughs, Irenicum (1653)
- John Dury, Irenicum: in quo casus conscientiæ inter ecclesias evangelicas pacis, breviter proponuntur & decidunter (1654)
- Daniel Zwicker, Irenicum irenicorum (1658)
- Edward Stillingfleet, Irenicum: A Weapon Salve for the Church's Wounds (1659 and 1661)
- Matthew Newcomen. Irenicum; or, An essay towards a brotherly peace & union, between those of the congregational and presbyterian way (1659)
- Moses Amyraut, Irenicum sive de ratione pacis in religionis negotio inter Evangelicos (1662)
- Samuel Mather, Irenicum: or an Essay for Union (1680)

Isaac Newton wrote an Irenicum (unpublished manuscript); it supported a latitudinarian position in theology, derived from a review of church history.

== Evaluation of early modern irenicism ==
Anthony Milton writes:

[Ecumenical historians] have tended to assume the existence of an irenical 'essentialism' in which the association of Christian unity with peace, toleration and ecumenism is presupposed. [...] In fact, most thinkers of this period accepted that religious unity was a good idea, in the same way that they believed that sin was a bad idea. The problem was that, of course, different people wanted irenicism on different terms. [...] Different interpretations of irenicism could have direct political implications, making the rhetoric of Christian unity an important tool in the political conflicts of the period.

It is in that light that he comments on the irenists' succession: Erasmus, Cassander, Jacob Acontius, Grotius, then John Dury, who spent much time on a proposed reconciliation of Lutherans and Calvinists.

== Modern usage ==
Irenical has become a commonly used adjective to design an idealist and pacific conception, such as the democratic peace theory.

False irenicism or false eirenism is an expression used in certain 20th-century documents of the Catholic Church to criticize attempts at ecumenism that would allow Catholic doctrine to be distorted or clouded. Documents using the term include the encyclical letter Humani generis, promulgated by Pope Pius XII in 1950, Pope Paul VI's encyclical letter, Ecclesiam Suam, the Second Vatican Council's 1964 Decree on Ecumenism, Unitatis Redintegratio, Pope John Paul II's Ut unum sint, and his 1984 post-synodal apostolic exhortation, Reconciliatio et paenitentia.

Modern positive examples of Catholic non-false irenicism can be seen in the Document on Human Fraternity joint declaration of Pope Francis and Sheikh Ahmed el-Tayeb, and of Pope Benedict XVI's reported request for the Catholic church to participate in celebrations of the 500th anniversary of the Protestant Reformation in 2017.
