= John Forbes (theologian, born 1593) =

Scottish minister and theologian

John Forbes of Corse (2 May 1593 – 29 April 1648) was a Scottish Presbyterian minister and theologian, one of the Aberdeen doctors, noted for his eirenic approach in church polity and opposition to the National Covenant.

== Life ==
He was the second son of Patrick Forbes of Corse Castle, bishop of Aberdeen, by his marriage to Lucretia, a daughter of David Spens of Wormiston, Fife. He entered King's College, Aberdeen, in 1607. In 1612 he visited his exiled uncle John Forbes at Middelburg, and then went to the university of Heidelberg. There he studied theology under David Pareus. In 1615 he moved to Sedan and continued his studies under his kinsman Andrew Melville. After some time at other universities, he was ordained at Middelburg in April 1619, by his uncle John Forbes and other presbyters.

He married about this time a Middelburg lady, Soete Roosboom, and returned the same year to Aberdeen, of which his father was by then bishop. In 1620 he was appointed by the synod professor of divinity in King's College. His first publication, Irenicum Amatoribus Veritatis et Pacis in Ecclesia Scoticana, Aberdeen, 1629, was commended by James Ussher. In this work he defended with moderation the lawfulness of episcopacy, and of the innovations in worship allowed by the synod of Perth in 1618.

On his father's death in 1635 he succeeded to the Corse Castle estate, his elder brother Patrick having predeceased him. He contributed a Latin sermon, a Dissertatio de Visione Beatifica, and Latin verses to the bishop's 'Funerals,' and probably supervised the whole collection. When at Aberdeen he sought recreation in the game of golf. In February 1637 he took some part in furthering John Durie's plans for uniting the reformed and Lutheran churches. Forbes, though he deplored Charles I's measures for remodelling the church of Scotland, considered the National Covenant an unlawful bond, and in April 1638 he published a tract against it entitled A Peaceable Warning to the Subjects in Scotland.

In July 1638 the Earl of Montrose, Alexander Henderson, and other covenanting leaders visited Aberdeen to make converts to their cause. Forbes and five other Doctor of Divinity put into their hands a paper containing queries concerning the covenant, and a debate followed, which was conducted in writing. The doctors argued against the covenant as unlawful in itself, and as abjuring episcopacy and Perth articles, to which they had sworn obedience at their ordination. In 1639 subscription was made compulsory. Efforts were made to induce Forbes to sign. In 1640, Forbes wrote that he was asked to sign the Covenant again but answered:

I am so carefull of the publicke peace, yt qtsoever I can do for it unhurting my qscience (wch G[od] direct & preserve) I will heartily do it, But seing for the present I finde not warrant in my conscience to subscryve yt Covenant in such manner as they require, but only to subscrive it wt a written declaration insert befor my subscription, wch I perceive will not be acceptable to the requirers, I prayed ym to thinke it more convenient not to require anie more of me but a peaceable behaviour.

Many covenanters acknowledged his orthodoxy and delayed proceedings in his case in the hope of his submission. His final answer was that he could not profess what his conscience condemned, and he was thereupon deprived of his chair, and forced to leave the official residence, which he had himself given to the university. The synod of Aberdeen petitioned the general assembly to allow him to continue his professorial duties without taking the covenant, but this was refused. He made no separation from the church, now presbyterian, but attended its services and received the communion as formerly.

In 1643 the solemn league and covenant was sanctioned by the assembly and parliament, and all adults were ordered to swear it on pain of confiscation, and of being declared enemies to God, king, and country. For Forbes, who thought the solemn league more objectionable than the national covenant, obedience was out of the question, and to escape prosecution he sailed for Veere 5 April 1644, with his surviving son George; his wife had died in 1640. He visited towns in the Netherlands, and at Amsterdam prepared his major theological work.

Forbes preached frequently in the Scots and English churches, and often joined in the Dutch and French services. He returned to Aberdeen in July 1646, and spent the remainder of his life in seclusion at Corse. He died there on 29 April 1648 and was buried in the churchyard of Leochel. His son George married a daughter of Kennedy of Kermuck. A second edition of his Instructiones was published at Geneva in 1680, and in 1702-3 all of his works in Latin were printed at Amsterdam in two folio volumes. This edition contains a translation into Latin of his diary, treatises on moral theology, and the Pastoral Care, and his previously printed works, with additions and corrections from his manuscripts.

== Works ==
- The First Book of the Irenicum of John Forbes of Corse: a contribution to the theology of re-union; translated and edited with introduction, notes & appendices, by Edward Gordon Selwyn. Cambridge: University Press, 1923 ( Irenicum amatoribus veritatis et pacis in ecclesia scoticana, Aberdeen, 1629)
