= Cuttie-stool =

Short stool

A cuttie-stool, or cutty-stool (also -stuil), was a type of three-legged chair used in Scotland. It was a short stool, often having a round seat on the top, but the word also designates a larger piece of furniture associated with public penance in church.

Such stools were often used for milking and domestic purposes, and afforded little comfort other than to provide balance to the worker concerned. They were cheap to buy and easy to make, and their three legs made them stable on uneven floors. "Cutty" or "cuttie" means "short" in Lowland Scots, and can be found in such phrases as "cutty sark" (the nickname of the witch in "Tam o' Shanter", derived from her only garment, a short shift).

== Penance stool ==
Dean Ramsay (1793–1872) says:

"A circumstance connected with Scottish church discipline has undergone a great change in my time – I mean the public censure from the pulpit of persons convicted of a breach of the seventh commandment ... this was performed by the guilty person standing on a raised platform called the cutty-stool"

He adds:

"The culprits did not always take the admonition patiently. It is recorded of one of them in Ayrshire, that when accused of adultery by the minister, he interrupted and corrected his reverend monitor by denying the imputation, and calling out, 'Na! Na! Minister; it was simple fornie (fornication) and no adultery ava.'"

"The Cutty Stool.—In a church in the Black Isle district, Ross-shire, on a recent Sunday, a woman who had been guilty of transgressing the Seventh Commandment was condemned to the cutty stool, and sat during the whole service with a black shawl thrown over her head."

== Jenny Geddes' Cutty-stool Riot ==
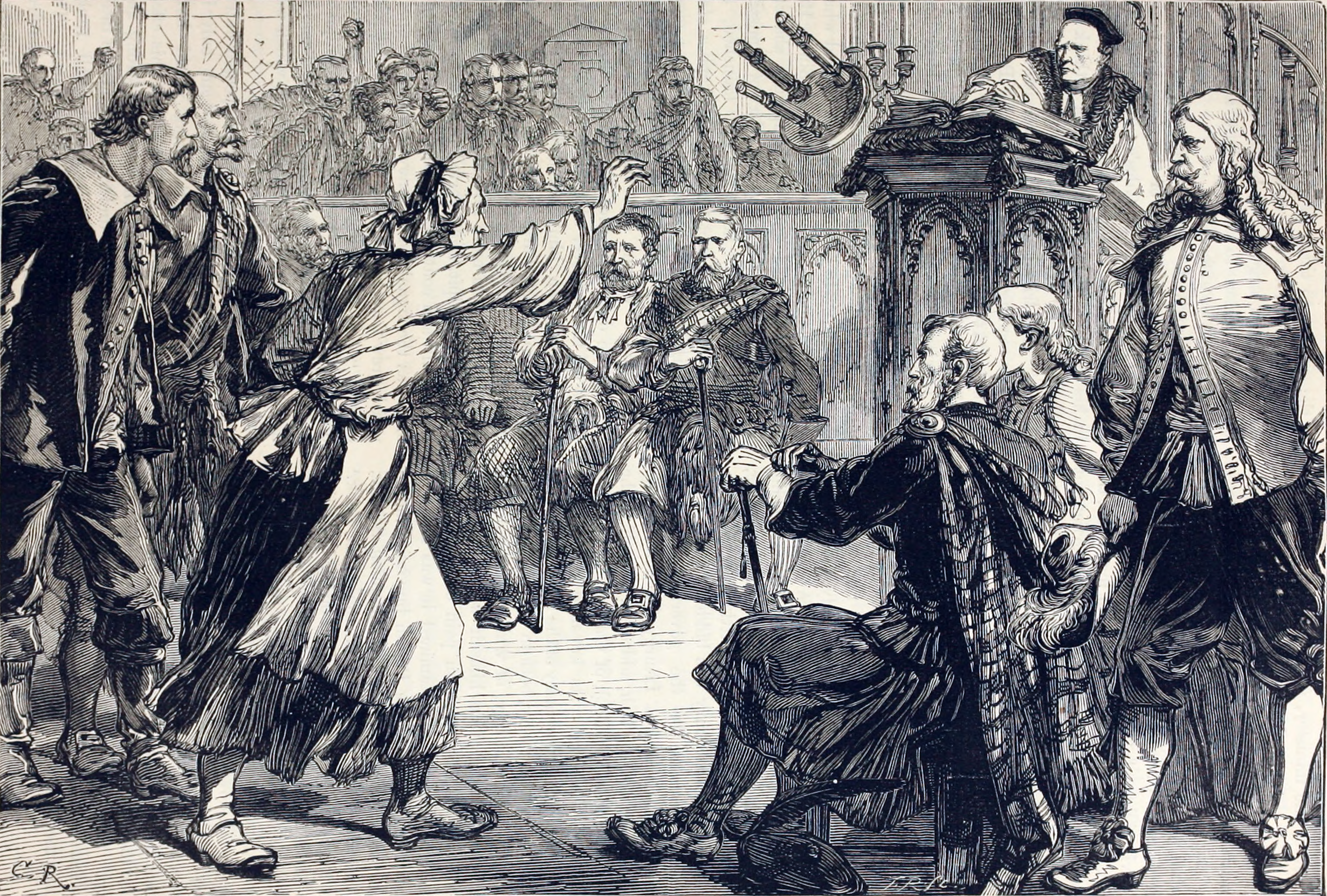
Historic engraving of Jenny Geddes throwing a cuttie-stool

"In 1637, Charles I of England insisted on introducing a new prayer book. The Book of Common Prayer followed the content of the Anglican prayer book very closely even though it was written by Scottish bishops." Jenny Geddes reportedly threw a cutty stool when the Church of Scotland introduced the Book of Common Prayer at St Giles' Cathedral in Edinburgh, Scotland, on 23 July 1637. The resulting actions and reactions caused a riot that resulted in the Church of Scotland refusing to adopt the English Book of Common Prayer. This and other actions widened the split between the Presbyterian Scots and the Church of England. Although the name of the woman who actually threw the stool is disputed, the story and the name came from some of the writings of the period.

In 1992 a bronze statue of the cutty stool thrown by Jenny Geddes was dedicated in St Giles' Cathedral. Designed and sculpted by Merilyn Smith, the stool was paid for by a subscription of forty women in the cathedral. Entitled, "Dux Femina Facti" ("A woman was the leader of the deed"), it was placed on the Moray Aisle of the cathedral, near a plaque dedicated to Jenny Geddes in 1886.

"In 1992 a group of Scotswomen presented a bronze sculpture of a stool 'in Memory of Jenny Geddes'. For some reason it has wrongly been called 'The Cutty Stool', but that, of course, was actually the name given to the stool of repentance in the seventeenth century."

== See also ==
- Penance

== Bibliography ==
- Coleman, Everard Home. 1884. "Recent Use of the Cutty Stool". Notes and Queries. 6-IX, no. 219: 186.
- Housman, Laurence. The Cutty Stool. n.d. Abstract: Typescript signed. Play, corrected by Housman. Published in Cornered poets, 1929.
- Lothian, Murdoch. The Cutty Stool. Glasgow: Hughson Gallery, 1995.
- MacKay, Charles – A Dictionary of Lowland Scotch (1888)
