= Alexander Henderson (theologian) =

Scottish theologian (c.1583 – 1646)

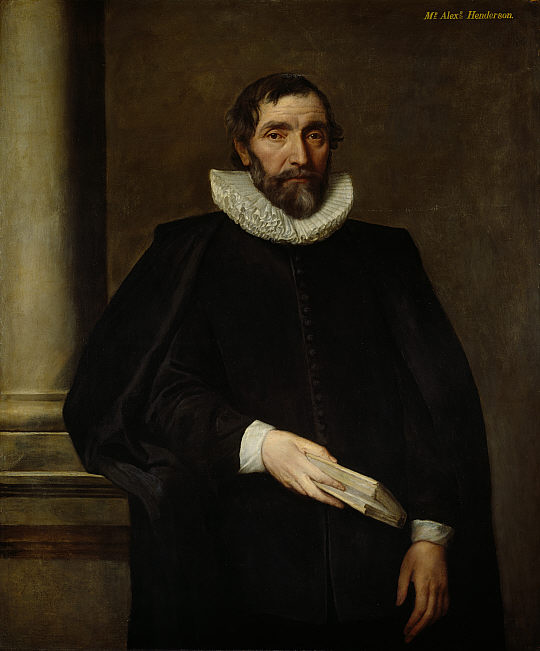
- Born: c. 1583; Guthrie, in the Fife parish of Creich
- Died: 19 August 1646; Edinburgh, Scotland
- Education: University of St Andrews
- Occupations: Pastor, author, reformer
- Notable work: The Government and Order of the Church of Scotland (1641)
- Spouse: none
- Theological work
- Tradition or movement: Presbyterianism

Alexander Henderson (c. 1583 – 19 August 1646) was a Scottish theologian, and an important ecclesiastical statesman of his period. He is considered the second founder of the Reformed Church in Scotland. He was one of the most eminent ministers of the Church of Scotland in the most important period of her history, namely, previous to the middle of the seventeenth century.

Alexander Henderson was born in 1583, and studied at the University of St. Andrews. He was, through the influence of Archbishop Gladstanes, presented to the church living of Leuchars, Fifeshire, and was in 1615 inducted forcibly into the charge. He was then a supporter of episcopacy; he subsequently changed his views and became a zealous upholder of Presbyterianism. He opposed the adoption of the Five Articles of Perth in 1618, and resisted the use of the Scottish Prayer Book in 1637.

He drafted both the National Covenant of 1638 with Archibald Johnston, Lord Warriston, and the Solemn League and Covenant of 1643. He preached in the Greyfriars church on 28 February 1638, when the National Covenant was signed, and presided as Moderator of the memorable General Assembly held at Glasgow in the following November. On two subsequent occasions he was chosen Moderator of Assembly. He was Rector of Edinburgh University, and instituted a Professorship of Oriental Languages in that seat of learning. With a view to conciliate the Presbyterians, Charles I appointed him his chaplain on his visit to Scotland in 1641.

Henderson was entrusted with various important missions; he was one of the commissioners who represented the Scottish Church at the Assembly of Divines at Westminster, and he was honoured with several interviews by Charles I when he endeavoured, though unsuccessfully, to bring the king over to Presbyterianism. He died at Edinburgh on 19 August 1646. At the Restoration the inscriptions on his tombstone were obliterated; they were restored at the Glorious Revolution.

== Early life ==
Alexander Henderson was born at Guthrie, in the Fife parish of Creich, in 1583. Of his parentage and family history hardly anything is known. Tradition, following from Wodrow, says he was the son of a feuar, and a cadet of the Hendersons of Fordel. In support of the latter statement, his remains lie in the burying-ground of that family in Greyfriars Churchyard, and a contemporary portrait of him is still in possession of a representative of that house. His birthplace was between the villages of Luthrie and Branton. To the maintenance of a school at Luthrie he left two thousand marks Scots in his will. On 19 December 1599, at the age of sixteen, he matriculated at St Salvator's College, St Andrews, and took his degree of M.A. in 1603. From 1603 to 1611 he was a Regent of Philosophy, and during that period he completed his course in divinity.

== Early career ==
He adopted strong prelatic principles, and was a staunch upholder of Archbishop Gledstanes, who afterwards became his patron, and presented him to the parish of Leuchars. His settlement was so unpopular that on the day of his ordination, probably in January 1614, the church doors were found securely nailed up, and he and his friends were obliged to enter by the window. Mr. Henderson at first showed but little concern for the spiritual interests of his people; but his sentiments and character soon underwent a complete change.

A Communion sermon preached in a neighbouring parish by Robert Bruce of Kinnaird, was the means of changing Henderson's spiritual outlook. Attracted by the fame of the preacher, he slipped (so goes the story) into the darkest corner of the church, hoping to steal out again unrecognised. Bruce chose for his text the words: "He that entereth not by the door," etc. This passage, so applicable to his situation, and the sermon which followed, made such an impression on his mind as led to an entire change in his views and conduct. Bruce, nevertheless, seems to have been aware of his presence; or, if not, there was a singular coincidence in the applicability of the text which he chose, to the remarkable circumstances which attended Henderson's induction to his charge.

Robert Bruce's sermon made such a powerful impression upon him that it effected an entire change in his religious conduct and sentiments; and from being a careless and indifferent pastor over his flock, and an upholder of a system odious in the highest degree to the people, he became a watchful and earnest minister, and a resolute champion in the cause of Presbyterianism. He now became thoroughly convinced that the proceedings of the prelatical party were injurious to the interests of religion, and he resolved at once to take part with the Presbyterians. His first appearance in that connection was at the Perth Assembly of 1618, when he strenuously opposed the Five Articles, notwithstanding the threats of the Government.

Henderson stood among the foremost of those who opposed, though unsuccessfully, the obnoxious measure; and this too, in defiance of the king's utmost wrath, with which all who resisted the adoption of the Five articles were threatened. "In case of your refusal," said the archbishop of St Andrews, addressing the assembled clergymen, "the whole order and estate of your church will be overthrown, some ministers will be banished, others will be deprived of their stipends and office, and all will be brought under the wrath of authority."

In August 1619 he appeared before the Court of High Commission charged with the publication of a pamphlet denouncing the Perth Assembly. On their appearance, Mr. Henderson answered the accusation with so much eloquence and truth, that the bishops could gain no advantage over him and his friends, and were obliged to dismiss them with threatenings, and Henderson returned to his parish. Of the next eighteen years we know little or nothing.

== The National Covenant - Contending against Episcopacy ==
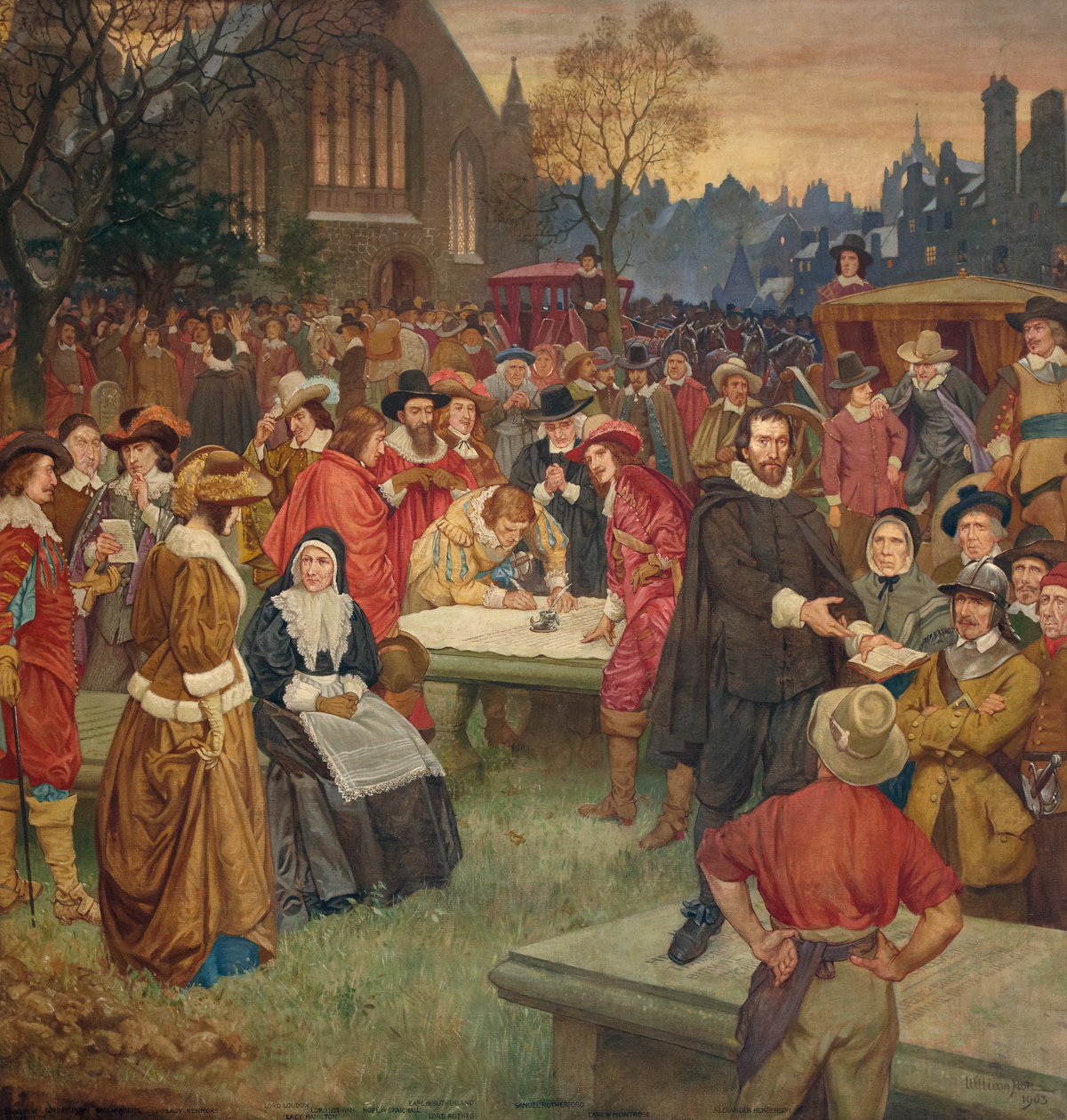
The Signing of the National Covenant. The Victorian painter William Hole places Henderson (standing on the gravestone) at the centre of events in 1638. Archibald Johnston is on the left.

With the memorable year 1637 Henderson reappears on the scene, a keen opponent of the Scottish Prayer Book, also known as "Laud's Liturgy," which King Charles was determined to foist on the Church.

In common with other ministers, he had been charged to purchase two copies of the liturgy for the use of his parish within fifteen days, under the pain of rebellion. He immediately went to Edinburgh, and, 23 August, presented a petition to the privy council, representing that the service book had not received the sanction of the General Assembly, nor was recognised by an act of parliament, and praying a suspension of the charge. To this remonstrance the council returned a favourable answer, and the reading of the liturgy was ordered to be suspended until the king's farther pleasure should be known.

Charles, however, only the more peremptorily insisted that the service book should be received; and from this time forward Mr. Henderson took a prominent share in all the proceedings of the nonconformists. A great number of the nobility, gentry, clergymen, and representatives of burghs, with others, had assembled in Edinburgh from all parts of the country; and after another supplication had been presented to the privy council, praying them to bring the matter again before the king, a proclamation from his majesty was made, requiring all persons to depart to their homes within twenty-four hours, on pain of being denounced rebels. Instead of dispersing, the leaders of the popular party, after some farther ineffectual petitions to the king, resolved to appeal to the people, and the result was the renewal of the National Covenant of 1580 and 1581, with only some slight changes adapted to the circumstances of the times. It was prepared by Mr. Henderson, assisted by Lord Warrison, Archibald Johnston, an advocate in whom, we are told, the suppliants chiefly confided, and was sworn and subscribed in the Greyfriars' church of Edinburgh, on 28 February 1638, by thousands of the nobility, gentry, ministers of the gospel, burgesses, and others. Mr. Henderson addressed the vast multitude assembled with great fervour and eloquence, aud the enthusiasm of the people knew no bounds. He was subsequently sent with several noblemen, and Messrs. Cant and Dickson, to Aberdeen, to prevail on the inhabitants of that city to take the Covenant, and, after urging upon them the strongest arguments in favour of the document, no less than 500 persons subscribed it, many of them being of the highest respectability.

Mainly through Henderson's influence the National League and Covenant was signed, 21 February 1638, and he was Moderator of the Assembly which met at Glasgow, 21 November of the same year.

On 1 March 1638 the public signing of the National Covenant began in Greyfriars Kirk, Edinburgh. Henderson was mainly responsible for the final form of this document, which consisted of:

1. the king's confession drawn up in 1581 by John Craig
2. a recital of the acts of parliament against superstitious and papistical rites
3. an elaborate oath to maintain the true reformed religion.

Owing to the skill shown on this occasion he seems to have been applied to when any manifesto of unusual ability was required. In July of the same year he proceeded to the north to debate on the Covenant with the famous Aberdeen doctors but he was not well received. Robert Baillie wrote: "The Voyd church was made fast, and the keys kept by the magistrate".

Henderson's next public opportunity was in the famous Assembly which met in Glasgow on 21 November 1638. He was chosen moderator by acclamation, being, as Baillie says, incomparable the ablest man of us all for all things. James Hamilton, 1st Duke of Hamilton, was the king's commissioner; and when the Assembly insisted on proceeding with the trial of the bishops, he formally dissolved the meeting under pain of treason. Acting on the constitutional principle that the king's right to convene did not interfere with the church's independent right to hold assemblies, they sat till 20 December, deposed all the Scottish bishops, excommunicated a number of them, repealed all acts favouring episcopacy, and reconstituted the Scottish Kirk on thorough Presbyterian principles. During the sitting of this Assembly it was carried by a majority of seventy-five votes that Henderson should be transferred to Edinburgh. He had been at Leuchars for about twenty-three years and was extremely reluctant to leave it.

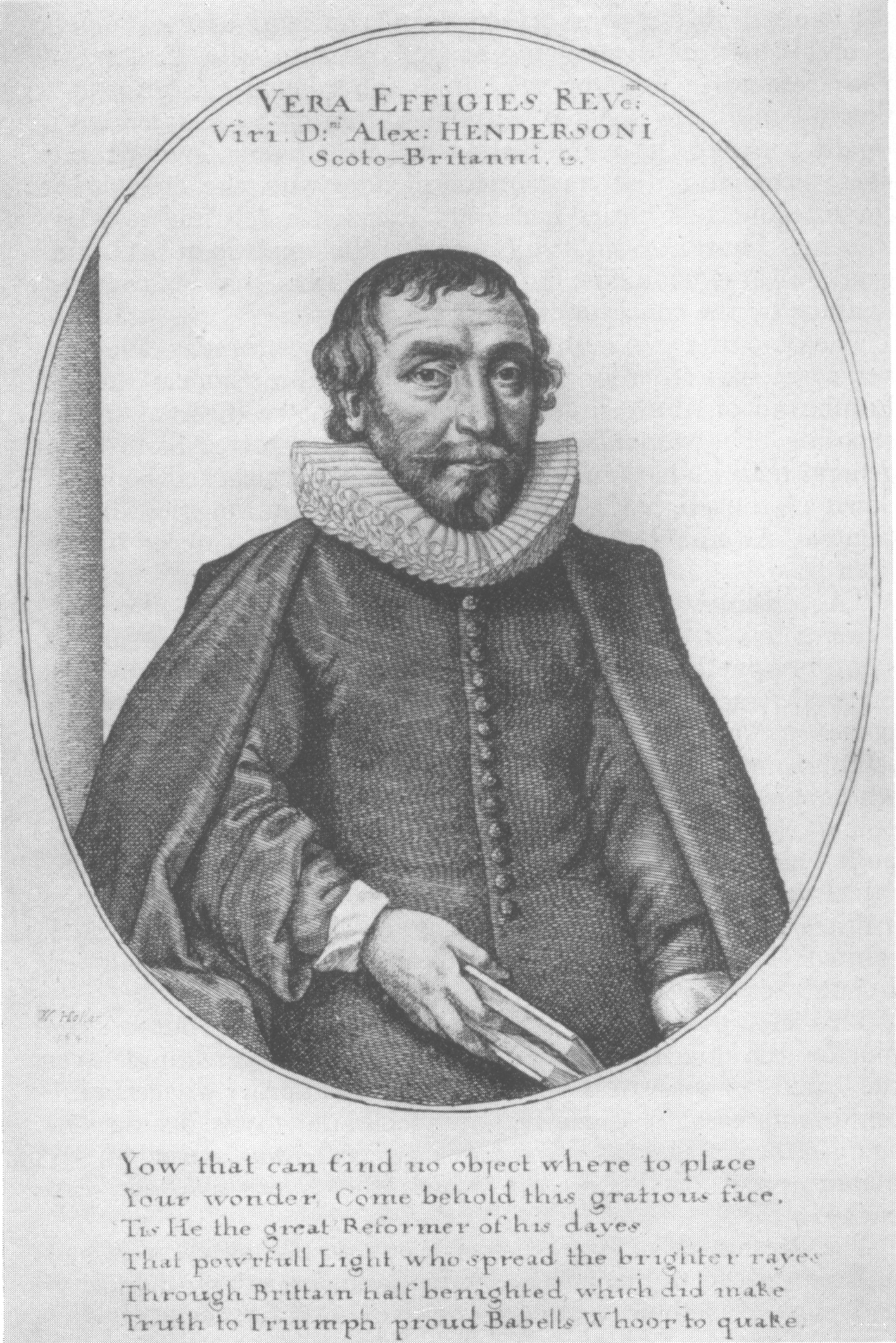
Moderator of the General Assembly, 1638

While Scotland and England were preparing for the First Bishops' War, Henderson drew up two papers, entitled respectively The Remonstrance of the Nobility and Instructions for Defensive Arms. The first of these documents he published himself; the second was published against his wish by John Corbet, a deposed minister. The text was written in haste in 1639 and is reported to have been lifted from a work by Johannes Althusius to provide justification for bearing arms.

The First Bishops' War did not last long. At the Pacification of Birks, the king virtually granted all the demands of the Scots. In the negotiations for peace, Henderson was one of the Scottish commissioners and made a favourable impression on the king. At the General Assembly which met at Glasgow the same year, 21 November 1638, the first that had been held for a long period, Mr. Henderson, now the acknowledged leader of the clergy, was unanimously chosen moderator. After the deposition and excommunication of the bishops, and the formal abolition of Episcopacy, Mr. Henderson terminated the proceedings with an address to the members of the Assembly, concluding with these striking words: — "We have now cast down the walls of Jericho; let him that re-buildeth them beware of the curse of Hiel the Bethelite!"

Before the rising of the Assembly two supplications were given in, the one containing a call to Mr. Henderson from St. Andrews, and the other from Edinburgh. Being much attached to his own parish of Leuchars, of which he had been minister for eighteen years, he expressed his unwillingness to remove from it, pleading that he was now too old a plant to take root in another soil. It was carried, however, by seventy-five votes, that he should be translated to Edinburgh; to which he consented, on condition that when old age should overtake him, he should again be removed to a country charge.

== Dealings with the king ==
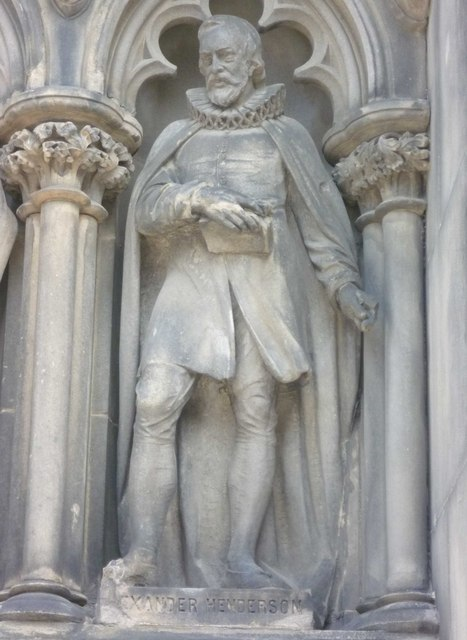
Alexander Henderson statue, west door of St. Giles

He received calls to St Andrews, and Greyfriars, Edinburgh, and was translated to St. Giles, Edinburgh on 10 January 1639, replacing James Hannay. He was appointed a Commissioner for framing a treaty of peace with England.

In 1639 he was one of the commissioners appointed by the Church to treat regarding the articles of pacification with the king; and during the whole of the difficult negotiations that ensued, he behaved with great prudence and candour. At the subsequent meeting of the Assembly, in August of that year, John Stewart, 2nd Earl of Traquair, commissioner from his majesty, earnestly desired that Mr. Henderson might be re-elected moderator, a proposition strenuously opposed by Mr. Henderson himself, and rejected by the Assembly, a constant moderatorship being contrary to the constitution of the Church. On the 31st of the same month, he was called upon to preach at the opening of parliament, on which occasion he delivered an excellent discourse, in which he treated, with consummate ability, of the end, duties, and utility of magistrates. He declined to be elected Moderator again in 1639.

The king having refused to ratify some of the points agreed upon at the late pacification, suddenly prorogued the parliament, denounced the Covenanters as rebels, and prepared again to invade Scotland. But the successes of the Scots army, which entered England in August 1640, compelled him to accede to another proposition for peace; and a conference was begun at Rippon, which, in a short time after, was transferred to London. Mr. Henderson was appointed one of the commissioners, on the part of the Church, to conclude the treaty, and during all the time of his residence in London, which was protracted for nine months, he exerted himself, by preaching and otherwise, to promote the views of the commissioners; and wrote a variety of able tracts and papers, some of which were published without his name, while others were laid before the commissioners and parliament of England. Before he left London he was admitted to a private conference with the king, the special object of which was to procure assistance to the Scottish universities from the rents formerly appropriated to the bishops, when he was graciously received by his majesty.

== University appointment ==
In January 1640 he was Rector of the University of Edinburgh, and held office for the rest of his life. In 1640 the town council of Edinburgh, with the view of rendering the system of education at the university more efficient, resolved to appoint annually a rector of that institution, and unanimously elected Mr. Henderson to the situation. He was empowered to superintend all matters connected with the conduct of the principal and professors, the education of the students, and the disposal of the revenues. In this office, which he appears to have enjoyed, by re-election, to his death, he exerted himself sedulously to promote the interests of that learned seminary. Besides devoting his especial attention to the education of candidates for the ministry, he instituted a professorship of oriental languages, a department previously much neglected.

In 1640 Henderson was elected by the town council rector of Edinburgh University, an office to which he was annually re-elected till his death. The Pacification of Birks had been wrung from the king and the Scots, seeing that he was preparing for the Second Bishops' War, took the initiative and pressed into England so vigorously that Charles had again to yield. The maturing of the treaty of peace took a considerable time and Henderson was again active in the negotiations, first at Ripon (1 October) and afterwards in London. While he was in London he had a personal interview with the king with the view of obtaining assistance for the Scottish universities from money formerly applied to the support of the bishops.

== Moderatorial activities ==
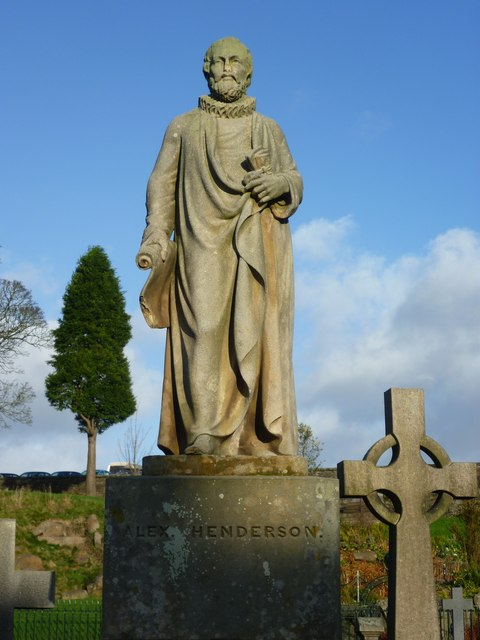
Alexander Henderson by Alexander Handyside Ritchie, Valley Cemetery, Stirling

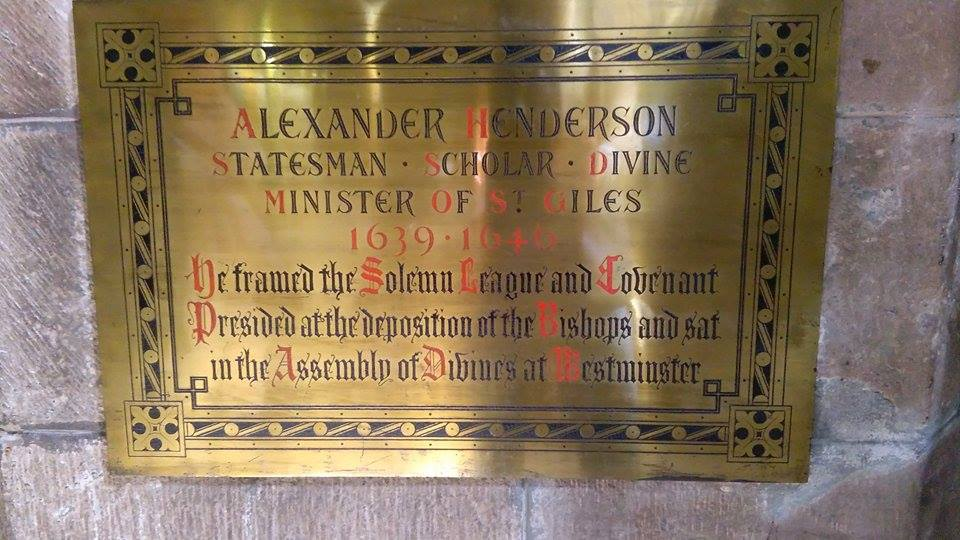
Plaque to Alexander Henderson, St Giles Cathedral, Edinburgh

On Henderson's return to Edinburgh in July 1641, the Assembly was sitting at St Andrews. To suit the convenience of the parliament, however, it removed to Edinburgh. On his return to Edinburgh, in July 1641, he was again chosen moderator of the General Assembly. In this Assembly he proposed that a confession of faith, a catechism, a directory for all the parts of the public worship, and a platform of government wherein possibly England and we might agree, should be drawn up. This was unanimously approved and the laborious undertaking was left in Henderson's hands but the notable motion did not lead to any immediate results.

During Charles's second state visit to Scotland in the autumn of 1641, Henderson acted as his chaplain and managed to get the funds, formerly belonging to the bishopric of Edinburgh, applied to the metropolitan university. The following year Henderson, whose policy was to keep Scotland neutral in the war which had now broken out between the king and the parliament, was engaged in corresponding with England on ecclesiastical topics; and shortly afterwards he was sent to Oxford to mediate between the king and his parliament but his mission proved a failure.

Having delivered in a letter from a number of ministers in London, requesting advice as to the proper form of church government to be adopted, several of their brethren being inclined towards Independency, the Assembly instructed him to answer it; and in his reply he earnestly urged a uniformity of church government in the two kingdoms. The Assembly unanimously approved of a motion which he brought forward, to the effect that they should take steps for drawing up a Confession of Faith, Catechism, Directory of Worship, and Form of Government; and remitted to him to prepare the necessary drafts of these documents. On 14 August, the king arrived at Edinburgh to be present at the parliament; on which occasion, wishing to conciliate the presbyterian party, he appointed Mr. Henderson his chaplain. During his majesty's residence in Edinburgh, he performed family worship every morning and evening at the palace, and frequently preached before him in the chapel-royal at Holyroodhouse. At this parliament the revenues of the bishoprics were divided; and by Mr. Henderson's exertions, what belonged to the bishopric and priory of Edinburgh were bestowed on the university. As a recompence for his own laborious and expensive services in the cause of the public, the emoluments of the chapel-royal, amounting to about 4,000 merks a-year, were conferred upon him.

Some reports injurious to his character having been industriously circulated, in the ensuing Assembly he entered into a long and impassioned vindication of his conduct. His brethren unanimously expressed their sympathy, and assured him of their continued confidence; on which we are told he recovered his cheerfulness.

In 1641, he preached before King Charles at Holyrood, and was made Dean of the Chapel Royal. A third time he was Moderator, 2 August 1643, and was elected a member of the Westminster Assembly of Divines. He declined the principalship of St Mary's College, St Andrews, and died unmarried 19 August 1646. Next to the Church, Henderson's greatest service was devoted to the University of Edinburgh. "He was the ablest educationist and the man of clearest insight of all who had to do with the college since its foundation. He saw what was wanted, and had the energy and the tact necessary for securing it. It would have been an inestimable advantage for the universities of Scotland if his life could have been prolonged for twenty years " (Grant's Univ. of Edinburgh, i., 209).

== Civil War ==
During the year 1642, the time of the English Civil War, Henderson was employed in managing the correspondence with England respecting ecclesiastical reformation and union. He was soon after chosen one of the commissioners appointed to proceed to that country, but was for some time delayed by the civil war. Anxious to effect a reconciliation between Charles and his English subjects, he joined with some other leading men in an invitation to the queen to come to Scotland; but this proposition was rejected by the king.

Accompanied by the other commissioners, he next went to Oxford, where his majesty then was, to offer him the mediation of Scotland; but the infatuated monarch, instead of making some concessions for the sake of peace, endeavoured to convince him of the justice of his cause, defended all his proceedings, and expressed his high indignation at the interest which the Scots took in the reformation of the church in England. On Henderson's return to Edinburgh, his conduct throughout this delicate negotiation was pronounced by the General Assembly to have been "faithful and wise."

== Westminster Assembly ==
In 1643 he was, for the third time, chosen moderator of the General Assembly — an occasion which was rendered remarkable by the presence of the English commissioners sent down by the parliament to crave their aid and connsel in the then critical circumstances of both kingdoms. He was appointed one of the commissioners who soon after went to London to attend the Assembly of divines at Westminster, to represent there the Church of Scotland, and to obtain the ratification of the Solemn League and Covenant by that Assembly and by both houses of parliament; which was accordingly done on 25 September. During the three following years he remained in London, unremittingly engaged in assisting the Westminster Assembly in preparing the public formularies for the religious union between the three kingdoms.

A memorable meeting of the General Assembly was held in August 1643. Henderson was elected moderator for the third time. He presented a draft of the famous Solemn League and Covenant, which was received with great enthusiasm. Unlike the National Covenant of 1638, which applied to Scotland only, this document was common to the two kingdoms. Henderson, Baillie, Rutherford and others were sent up to London to represent Scotland in the Assembly at Westminster. The Solemn League and Covenant, which pledged both countries to the extirpation of prelacy, leaving further decision as to church government to be decided by the example of the best reformed churches, after undergoing some slight alterations passed both parliaments, the Parliament of Scotland and the Parliament of England, and thus became law for the two kingdoms. By means of it Henderson has had considerable influence on the history of Great Britain.

As Scottish commissioner to the Westminster Assembly he was in England from August 1643 till August 1646 and his principal work was the drafting of the Directory for Public Worship.

== Last days ==
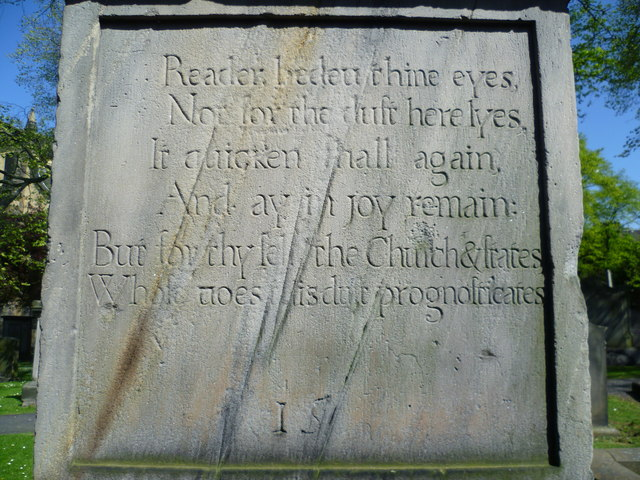
Inscription on Alexander Hendersons gravestone, Greyfriars Kirkyard

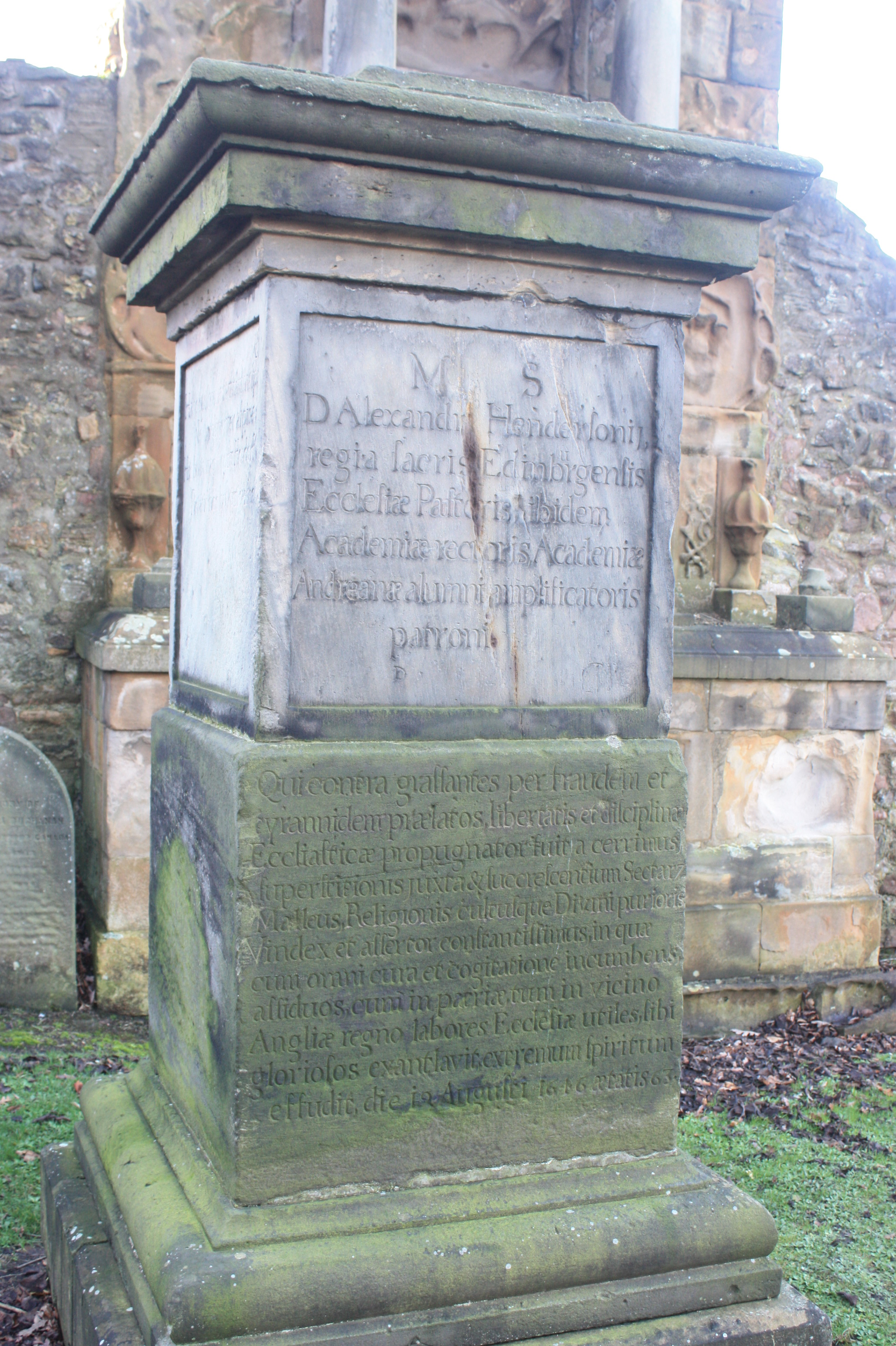
The grave of Alexander Henderson, Greyfriars Kirkyard

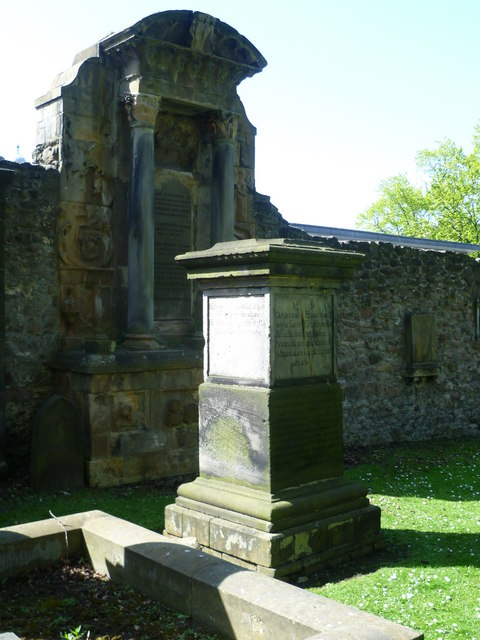
Grave of Alexander Henderson, Greyfriars Kirkyard

Early in 1645 Henderson was sent to the Treaty of Uxbridge to aid the commissioners of the two parliaments in negotiating with the king but nothing came of the conference. In 1646 the king joined the Scottish Army; and, after retiring with them to Newcastle-upon-Tyne, he sent for Henderson, and discussed with him the two systems of church government in a number of papers. Meanwhile, Henderson was failing in health. He sailed to Scotland, and eight days after his arrival died, on 19 August 1646. He was buried in Greyfriars Kirkyard, Edinburgh; the grave lies in the southwest section near the Adam mausoleum. His death was an occasion of national mourning in Scotland.

On 7 August Baillie had written that he had heard that Henderson was dying of heartbreak. A document was published in London purporting to be a declaration of Mr Alexander Henderson made upon his death-bed and, although this paper was disowned, denounced and shown to be false in the General Assembly of August 1648, the document was used by Clarendon as giving the impression that Henderson had recanted. Its foundation was probably certain expressions lamenting Scottish interference in English affairs.

The failure of this last enterprise was fatal to Henderson's already broken health. In June 1645 he had suffered from gravel, and tried the Epsom waters; he now showed symptoms of decline. Baillie, on 7 August, wrote that he heard he was 'dying most of heartbreak.' He sailed from Newcastle to Leith, and got home to Edinburgh. Here he dined with Sir James Stewart, and was extremely cheerful and hearty, but said, 'there was never a schoolboy more desirous to have the play than I am to have leave of this world.' He made his will on 17 August, and died on 19 August 1646.

In the beginning of 1645 he was appointed to assist the commissioners of the parliaments of England and Scotland in conducting the treaty between them and the king at Uxbridge. On the breaking off of the treaty he returned to London. In the spring of 1646, when the king had thrown himself into the hands of the Scottish army, he sent for Mr. Henderson, who was considered the most competent person to deal with his majesty in his then circumstances. He arrived at Newcastle about the middle of May, and received a welcome reception from the king, but soon perceived that Charles was as unwilling as ever to consent to the establishment of presbyterianism. It was agreed that the scruples which the king entertained should be discussed in a series of papers between his majesty and Mr. Henderson. These continued from 29 May to 15 July. They are eight in number, five by the king, who was assisted by Sir Robert Murray, and three by his reverend opponent. Mr. Henderson's health being much impaired, he was obliged to remove by sea to Edinburgh, where he died, 19 August 1646, in the 63d year of his age. His body was interred in the Greyfriars churchyard, where a monument was erected by his nephew to his memory.

== Works ==
- The Government and Order of the Church of Scotland (1641) https://archive.org/details/govordero00hend
- The answeres of some brethren of the ministerie : to the replyes of the ministers and professours of divinitie in Aberdeene, concerning the late covenent (1638) https://archive.org/details/answeresofsomebr00hend
- Reformation of church-government in Scotland : cleered from some mistakes and prejudices (1644) https://archive.org/details/reformationofchu00hend
- A sermon preached to the honourable House of Commons at their late solemne fast, Wednesday, 27 December 1643 [electronic resource] https://archive.org/details/asermonpreached00commgoog
- Generall demands concerning the late covenant propounded by the ministers and professors of divinity in Aberdene : to some reverend brethren who came thither to recommend the late covenant to them ... : together with the answers of those reverend brethren to the said demands .. (1662) https://archive.org/details/gendem00univ
- Sermons, prayers and pulpit addresses (1867 printing) https://archive.org/details/sermonsprayerspu00hend
- The Remonstrance of the Nobility, etc., within the Kingdom of Scotland, vindicating them and their Proceedings from the Crimes wherewith they are charged by the late Proclamation in England (1639)
- The Government and Order of the Church of Scotland (Edinburgh, 1641; another edition, 1690)
- Speech delivered immediately before the taking of the Covenant by the House of Commons and Assembly of Divines (Edinburgh, 1643)
- Three single Sermons preached before the Houses of Parliament (London, 1644, 1644, 1645)
- The Bishops' Doc/m (Edinburgh, 1762)
- Declaration upon his Deathbed [concerning King Charles'] (1648)
- Sermons, Prayers, and Pulpit Addresses, edited from the original MSS. by E. Thomson Martin (Edinburgh, 1867).
