= James Hannay (minister) =

Presbyterian activist (c. 1600 - c. 1660)

- Jenny Geddes throwing her stool at James Hannay
- Church: St. Giles' Cathedral

Personal details
- Born: 1595
- Died: June 1661 (aged 65–66)

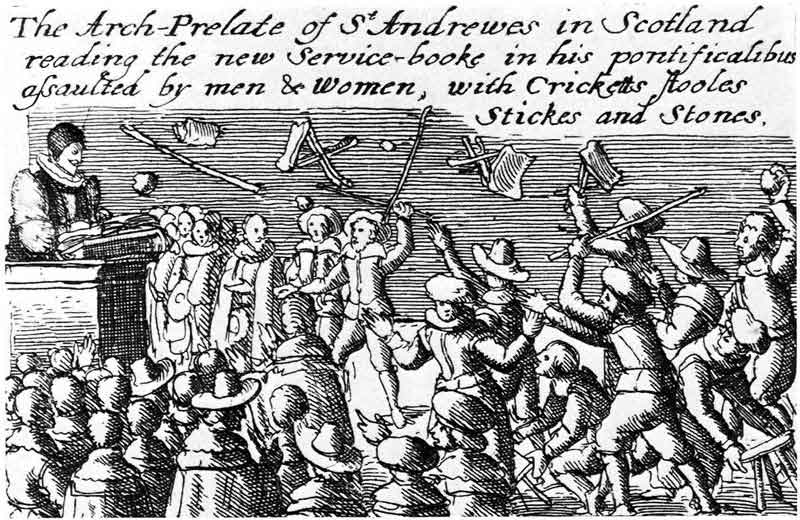
The Bishop of St Andrews was also at the riot in St Giles

Title page of The Book of Common Prayer, Scotland 1637

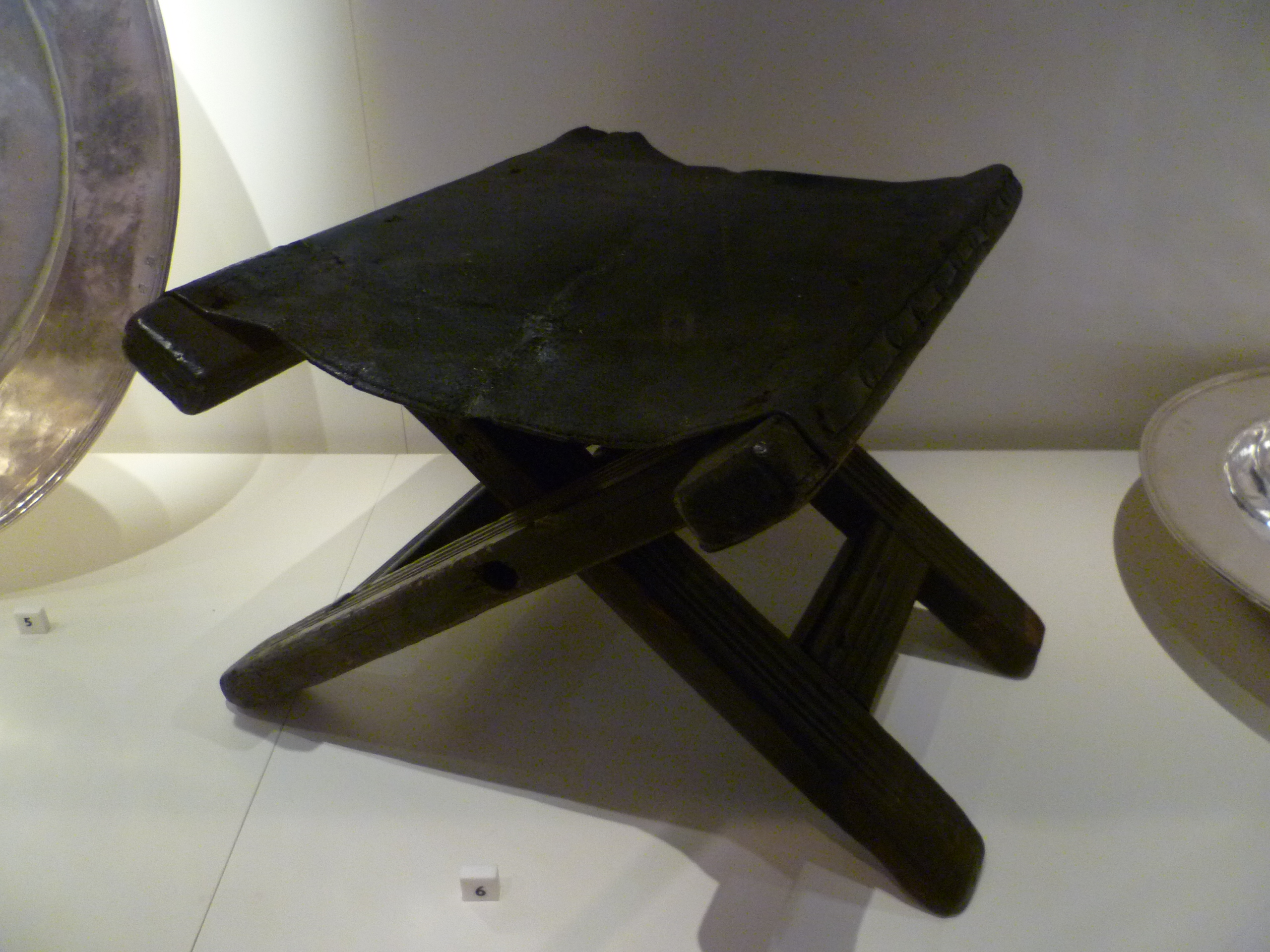
The folding stool thrown at Hannay

James Hannay (c.1595 – 1661) was a Scottish clergyman who served as Dean of the St Giles Cathedral. He is best remembered as the unfortunate clergyman struck on the head by a stool thrown by Jenny Geddes after reading from the English Book of Common Prayer.

== Life ==
He was born in the Canongate district of Edinburgh the son of John Hannay (d.1604) a bailie and burgess, and his second wife Maus Smyth. John had been an MP in Wigtownshire. John's father was Patrick Hannay of Sorbie.

He studied at Edinburgh University gaining an MA in 1615. He became minister of Kilmaurs in Ayrshire in 1620, and was translated to his home parish of Canongate in 1624. However, this predated the building of Canongate Kirk. The church at this time was continuing to worship in Holyrood Abbey.

At this time therefore the parish church was still connected to Holyrood Palace. In 1633 it was Hannay who performed the "coronation" of Charles I in Holyrood Abbey. This symbolic ceremony (Charles had been king for 8 years) apparently partly rebuilt missing elements of the Abbey to make it look appropriate for this regal function. Probably through this royal connection it was Charles I himself who presented Hannay to Edinburgh Town Council, twice in 1634, for the role of Dean of St Giles. The Council accepted this and presented him in March 1635 and he began the role of Dean in April 1635.

In the summer of 1635 Hannay went (with other senior Scottish clergy) to London to draft the Scottish Book of Common Prayer. In May 1637 King Charles granted Hannay estates in Kelso for his work on this. Hannay was inevitably a supporter of the Book of Common Prayer.

It is an incident on Sunday 23 July 1637 which places Hannay into the national understanding of the history of the Scottish Church. He was equipped with a new Edinburgh publishing by the King's official printer, Robert Young, fresh off the press: the Scottish Book of Common Prayer. This had been commissioned by Archbishop Laud, the Archbishop of Canterbury. Whilst modern eyes (or ears) might not appreciate the fury this incited, the core issue was the book (whilst being a "Scottish" version) was still intrinsically English. The service began with three prayers led by Rev Patrick Henderson from the uncontroversial Book of Common Order. As he finished he said he did not think he would be reading ever again. Hannay then took the Scottish Book of Common Prayer to the pulpit (at around 10am). The use of an English rather than Scottish liturgy was offensive, and had also sidestepped the control of the presbyteries. Many also saw it as a move back to the Catholic mass. Bishop Lindsay was close to Hannay in his pulpit when the reading sparked a widespread riot in the church. The Bishop of St Andrews and Bishop of Dunblane were also present. Infamously Jenny Geddes stood up and threw her stool at Hannay's head. Bishop Lindsay had moved to the pulpit to quell the crowd but was pulled out by a Mrs Main. The service had to be terminated. The demonstrators (most of the congregation) were ejected, but remained outside. This incident was a precursor to the National Covenant of 1638.

In April 1638 Hannay was one of three senior ministers who met the Bishops of Edinburgh, Dunblane and Argyll to discuss the way forward. Hannay's position was becoming more and more out of tune with the wider population. In 1639 Hannay was deposed for reading and defending the new service book and refusing the orders of the General Assembly.

His activities from 1639 to 1661 are unknown.

He died in June 1661. At the Restoration, and the return of a King to the throne (Charles II), his children were granted a pension, reflecting Hannay's continued Royalist support.

== Family ==
He married Isobel Brown (d.1674) who was buried in the Kirk of Holyrood House.

They had at least seven children:

- Magdalen
- John
- Martha
- William
- James
- George
- Marion (married George Smelholm, servitor to the Earl of Tweeddale: P. C. B., Third Series, i., 517)
- Isobel

== Bibliography ==
- Reg. Sec. Sig.
- Edin. Counc. and Canongate Reg. (Baptisms)
- Baillie's Lett., i.
- Stevenson's Hist.
- Peterkin's Rec
- Wodrow's MSS.
- Acts Pari., v., vii.
- Maitland Miscell., ii.
- Charters of St Giles
- Lees' St Giles
- Maitland Miscell., iii.
- Bannatyne Miscell., iii.
- Baillie's Lett., iii.

== Memorials ==
A brass plaque to Hannay was erected in St Giles Cathedral in the late 19th century.
