= Confession of Faith Ratification Act (1690) =

Scottish law on Christianity

Beginning text of the Confession of Faith Ratification Act

The Confession of Faith Ratification Act was an act created by the Parliament of Scotland in 1690 in order to settle the Presbyterian Church governance in Scotland. It officially allowed the Church of Scotland to be a Presbyterian Church, by ratifying the Westminster Confession of Faith. Finally, this act outlawed blasphemy.

Parts of this Act were changed in 1906 as part of the Statute Law Revision. However, it still stands today as valid in a legal sense. The Church of Scotland still uses the government outlined by the bill, but the last person to be charged with blasphemy was in 1843.

== Contents ==
The act includes an introductory text and then a written confession, that being Westminster Confession of Faith.

=== Introductory Text ===
The introduction of the act gives many rights and makes many claims about the Kingdom of Scotland. There are two provisions in the introduction.

==== Effects ====
The introduction states that the kingdom is forever against "popery and papists and for the maintenance and preservation of the true reformed protestant religion", continuing in stating that the true church of Chirst in there kingdom would use the confession given in the bill.

Later, the form of government is given, allowing for Presbyteries and a General Council. The Council would be elected by members of the Presbytery. It was stated this church would continue true reformation efforts in Scotland.

The rights given to the Kirk in the final part of the text is the ability and responsibility to depose ministers or elders for blasphemy, negligence, scandalous reasons. The people found guilty of these acts can, by ecclesiastical process, censure by suspension or deposition to stop benefits or pay. This part would later be removed by the Statue Law Revision in 1906.

==== Contents ====
The next provision states the contents, of which it states a Confession of Faith reviewed by the High Commissioner and Estates of Parliament. Some archives have these two provisions combined into one.

=== Contents of the Confession ===
There are, thirty-tree chapters of the confession. It follows the same set up and much of the same topics. The Confession lays out Calvinist theology. It states Predestination, reformed sacramentology, and Church structure.

== Attempt to Repeal ==
While there are no outstanding modern effects due to this bill, save for on the Church of Scotland, the political party SNP tried to repeal the bill in 2018. While it wasn't repealed, it was further amended to no longer include any punishment for blasphemy. This came after Baptist preacher Angus Cameron was arrested on the street because of this law.
