= William Forbes (bishop) =

Scottish bishop (1585–1634)

The Right Reverend William Forbes
- Bishop of Edinburgh
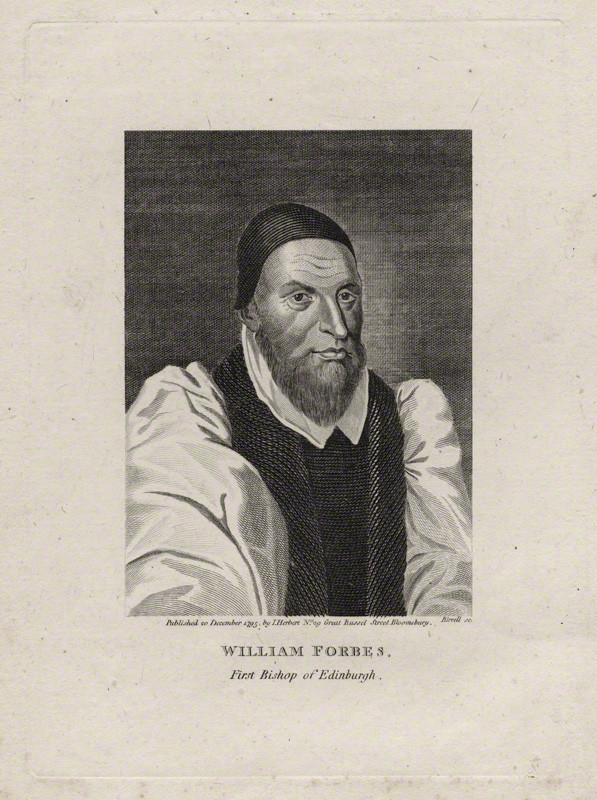

Personal details
- Born: 1585 Aberdeen, Scotland
- Died: 12 April 1634 (aged 48–49)
- Children: Arthur, Thomas
- Education: Marischal College

William Forbes (1585 – 12 April 1634) was a Scottish Anglican cleric, the first Bishop of Edinburgh. He also briefly served as principal of Marischal College.

== Life ==
He was the son of Thomas Forbes, a burgess of Aberdeen, descended from the Corsindac branch of that house, by his wife, Janet, the sister of the botanist James Cargill. Born at Aberdeen in 1585, he was educated at the Marischal College, graduating A.M. in 1601. Very soon after he held the chair of logic in the same college, but resigned from it in 1606 to pursue his studies on the continent. He travelled through Poland, Germany, and Holland, studying at several universities, and meeting Joseph Justus Scaliger, Hugo Grotius, and Gerardus Vossius. Returning after five years to Britain, he visited Oxford, where he was invited to become professor of Hebrew, but he pleaded ill-health.

Ordained, probably by Bishop Peter Blackburn of Aberdeen, he became minister successively of two rural Aberdeenshire parishes, Alford and Monymusk; in November 1616 (pursuant to a nomination of the general assembly) he was appointed one of the ministers of Aberdeen; and at the Perth assembly in 1618 was selected to defend the lawfulness of the article there proposed for kneeling at the holy communion. In the same year, in a formal dispute between him and Andrew Adie (or Aedie), then principal of Marischal College, he maintained the lawfulness of prayers for the dead. Such doctrines would not have been tolerated elsewhere in Scotland, but in Aberdeen they were received with favour, and on Adie's enforced resignation in 1620 the town council of the city, who were patrons of Marischal College, made him the principal, specifying that he should continue his preaching.

At the end of 1621, he was chosen one of the ministers of St Giles Cathedral in Edinburgh, being admitted in March 1622. In 1625 when the church was split into quarters, Forbes was given the south-east quarter (known as the Old Kirk) in January 1626. At his request, on grounds of ill-health, he transferred back to his native Aberdeen on Michaelmas 1626.

His zeal for the observance of the Perth articles was distasteful to many, and when he taught that the doctrines of the Catholics and the Reformed could in many points be easily reconciled, there was disorder. Five of the ringleaders were dealt with by the privy council; but Forbes felt that his ministry at Edinburgh was a failure, and more trouble arising from his preaching in support of the superiority of bishops over presbyters, he returned to Aberdeen, where in 1626 he resumed his former post. He served as rector of Marischal College in 1632.

In 1633, when Charles I was in Scotland for his coronation, Forbes preached before him at Holyrood, and his sermon so pleased the king that he declared the preacher to be worthy of having a bishopric created for him. Shortly afterwards the see of Edinburgh was erected; Forbes was nominated to it, and was consecrated in February 1634. In the beginning of March he sent an injunction to his clergy to celebrate the Eucharist on Easter Sunday to take it themselves on their knees, and to minister it with their own hands to every one of the communicants. When Easter came he was very ill, but he was able to celebrate in St. Giles' Cathedral; on returning home he took to bed, and died on the following Saturday, 12 April 1634, in the year of his 49th birthday. He was buried in his cathedral; his monument was afterwards destroyed, but a copy of the inscription is in William Maitland's History of Edinburgh.

He was married, and left a family, of whom one, Arthur, is said to have become Professor of Humanities at St. Jean d'Angel, near La Rochelle, while another, Thomas, entered the Catholic Seminary, the Scots College, Rome, and eventually entered the service of Cardinal Carlo Barberini.

== Works ==
Forbes himself published nothing, but in 1658 a posthumous work, Considerationes Modestae et Pacificae Controversiarum de Justificatione, Purgatorio, Invocatione Sanctorum Christo Mediatore, et Eucharistia, was published from his manuscripts by T. G. (Thomas Sydeserf, bishop of Galloway). Other editions appeared at Helmstadt (1704) and Frankfort-on-the-Main (1707); while a third, with an English translation by Dr. George Hay Forbes, Burntisland (Oxford, 1856), forms part of the Anglo-Catholic Library. In parts fragmentary, it deals with the imperial question of the Christian church: reunion of the church on a catholic scale. Forbes also wrote Animadversions on the works of Bellarmine, which was used by his friend and colleague at Marischal College, Robert Baron, but the manuscripts seem to have perished in the 'troubles' which so soon began. A summary of his sermon before Charles I is given in the folio edition (1702-3) of the works of Dr. John Forbes.
