= W. L. Mathieson =

Scottish historian

William Law Mathieson (26 February 1868 – 26 January 1938) was a Scottish historian.

He was born in Edinburgh, where he was also educated. He regularly reviewed books for the Athenaeum but his main work was writing history. His early books focused on Scottish history and by the late 1920s he had turned his attention to the history of slavery in the British Empire.

After his death, G. M. Trevelyan wrote his obituary in The Times and said that Mathieson had produced "a most remarkable series of histories, based on wide and deep scholarship, eminently readable, inspired by a philosophic charm and impartiality which humanised controversies and periods which are still too often the prey of partisan bitterness".

== Works ==
- Politics and Religion in Scotland: a Study in Scottish History from the Reformation to the Revolution, 1550–1695, two volumes (Glasgow: James Maclehose and Sons, 1902).
- Scotland and the Union: A History of Scotland from 1695 to 1747 (Glasgow: James Maclehose and Sons, 1905).
- The Awakening of Scotland: A History of Scotland from 1747 to 1797 (Glasgow: James Maclehose and Sons, 1910).
- Church and Reform in Scotland: A History from 1797 to 1843 (Glasgow: James Maclehose and Sons, 1916).
- England in Transition, 1789–1832: A Study in Movements (London: Longmans, Green and Co., 1920).
- English Church Reform, 1815–1840 (London: Longmans, Green and Co., 1923).
- British Slavery and its Abolition, 1823–1838 (London: Longmans, Green and Co., 1926).
- Great Britain and the Slave Trade, 1839–1865 (London: Longmans, Green & Co., 1929).
- British Slave Emancipation, 1838–1849 (London: Longmans, Green & Co., 1932).
- The Sugar Colonies and Governor Eyre, 1849–1866 (London: Longmans, Green & Co., 1936).
- 'The Emancipation of the Slaves, 1807–1838', The Cambridge History of the British Empire, Vol. II (Cambridge: Cambridge University Press, 1940).
