= Five Articles of Perth =

Attempt to impose certain views

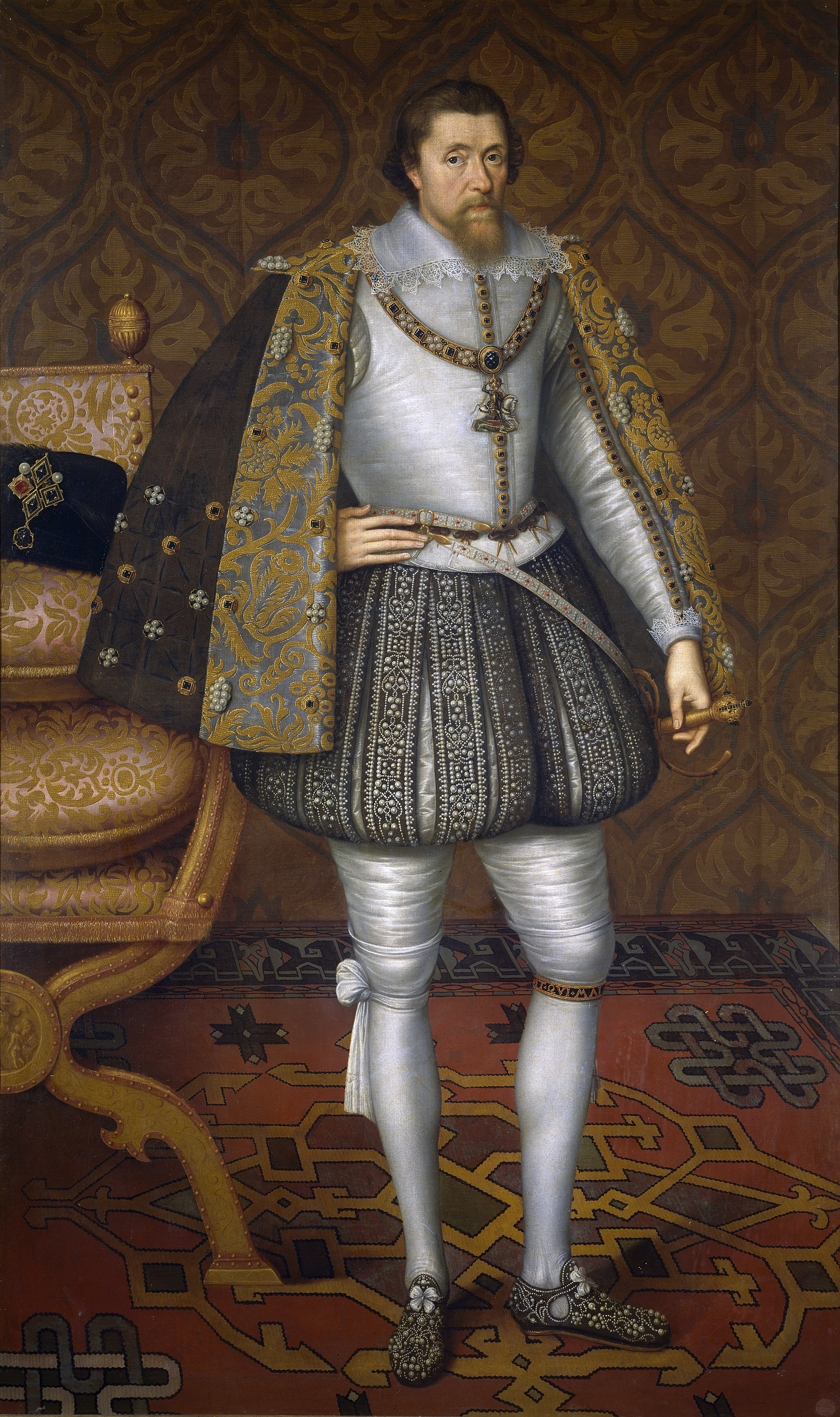
King James VI of Scotland

The Five Articles of Perth was an attempt by King James VI of Scotland to impose practices on the Church of Scotland in an attempt to integrate it with those of the Church of England. This move was unpopular with those Scots who held Reformed views on worship, and with those who supported presbyterian church governance.

== Summary ==
The articles required

- kneeling during communion
- private baptism
- private communion for the sick or infirm
- confirmation by a bishop
- the observance of Holy Days "enjoined the ministers to celebrate the festivals of Christmas and Easter" (see Christmas in Scotland)

== Reception ==
The articles met with a mixed reception. The Secession historian Thomas M'Crie tries to hint at the leading objections against them. Others like Robert Baillie accepted the liturgical changes even elaborating an exhaustive defence of kneeling at communion in protracted correspondence with David Dickson, the minister for the parish of Irvine.

Articles of Perth Act 1621
- Act of Parliament
- Parliament of Scotland
- Long title: A Ratificatioun of the fyve articles of the General Assemblie of the kirk haldin at Pearthe in the moneth of August 1618.
- Citation: 1621 c. 1 [12mo ed: c. 1]

Other legislation
- Repealed by: Confession of Faith Ratification Act (1690)

Status: Repealed

The articles were reluctantly accepted by the General Assembly of the Church at Perth in 1618, and were not ratified by the Scottish Parliament until the Articles of Perth Act 1621 (c. 1) in July 1621; it was known by some as Black Saturday and was accompanied by a thunderstorm. The approving act was repealed by the Confession of Faith Ratification Act 1690.

In 1619 the Pilgrims who were in exile in Leiden published a critical tract about the Five Articles, entitled the Perth Assembly, which nearly led to William Brewster's arrest.

== See also ==
- Bishops' Wars
- Episcopalianism in the Church of Scotland
