= National Covenant =

1638 opposition to Scottish Church reform

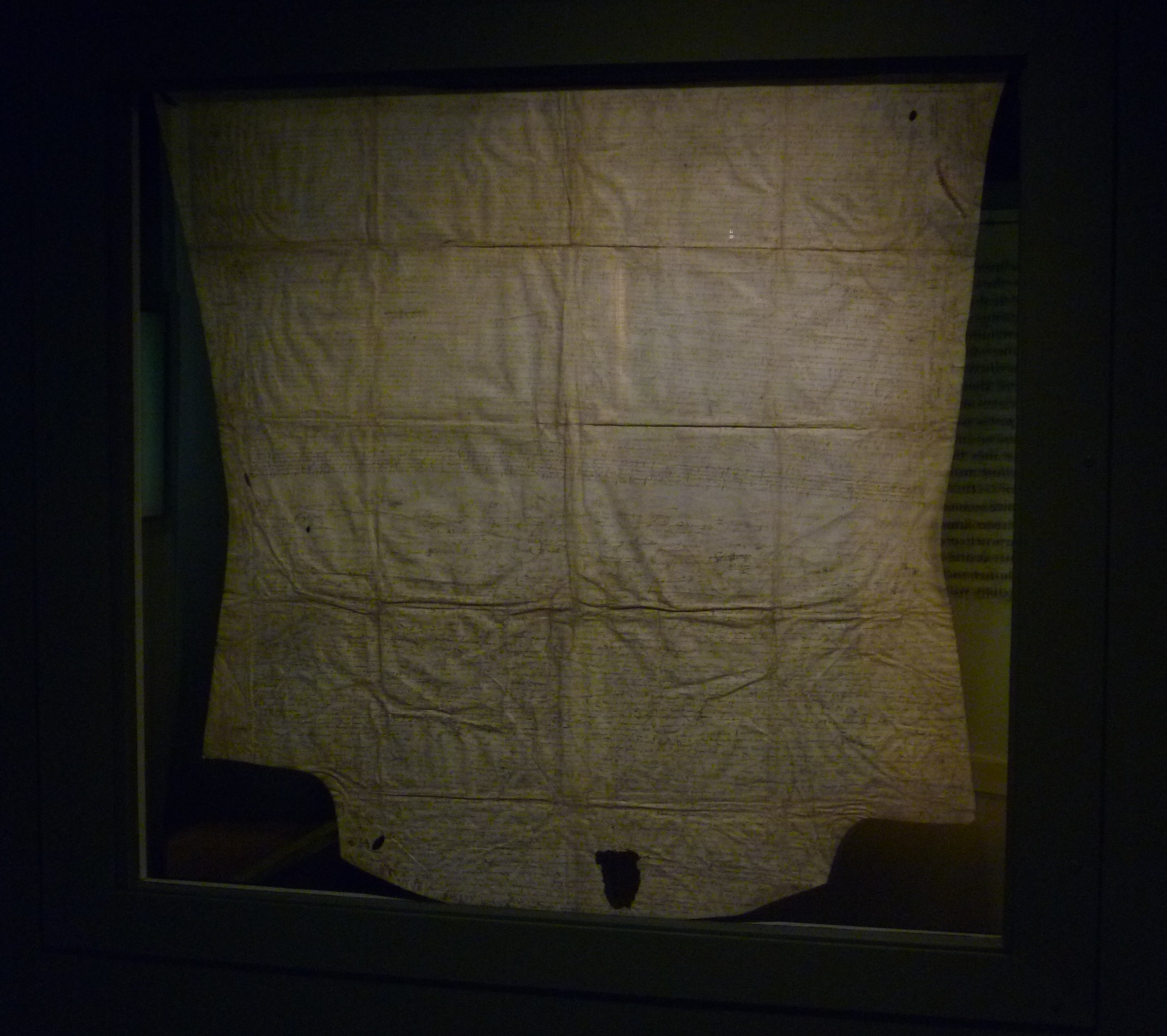
The National Covenant

The National Covenant (Scottish Gaelic: An Cùmhnant Nàiseanta) was an agreement signed by many people of Scotland during 1638, opposing the proposed Laudian reforms of the Church of Scotland (also known as the Kirk) by King Charles I. The king's efforts to impose changes on the church in the 1630s caused widespread protests across Scotland, leading to the organisation of committees to coordinate opposition to the king. Facing royal opposition, its leaders arranged the creation of the National Covenant to bolster the movement by tapping into patriotic fervour. It became widely adopted throughout most of Scotland with supporters henceforth known as Covenanters.

The Covenant opposed changes to the Church of Scotland, and committed its signatories to stand together in the defence of the nation's religion. Charles saw this as an act of rebellion against his rule, leading to the Bishops' Wars and beginning the Wars of the Three Kingdoms. The expenses of fighting the Bishops' Wars required the king to summon the Short Parliament and Long Parliament in England, his disputes with which led to the outbreak of the English Civil War.

== Background ==
Riots over the Prayer Book, set off by Jenny Geddes

The 16th century Reformation resulted in a Church of Scotland which was Presbyterian in structure and Calvinist in doctrine. In 1560, the Scottish Parliament designated the Kirk as the sole form of religion in Scotland, and adopted the Scots Confession which rejected many Catholic teachings and practices, including bishops.

The origins of the National Covenant arose from different perspectives on who held ultimate authority over the Kirk; James VI argued the king was also head of the church, governing through bishops appointed by himself. The alternative view held the Kirk was subject only to God, and its members, including James, were subject to the discipline of presbyteries, consisting of ministers and elders.

James successfully imposed bishops on the Kirk in 1596, but it remained Calvinist in doctrine; when he also became king of England in 1603, a unified Church of England and Scotland was the first step in building a centralised, Unionist state. The problem was that while both were nominally Episcopalian in structure, and Protestant in doctrine, the Church of England was very different from the Kirk in its forms of worship, and even Scottish bishops objected to many of these.

The outbreak of the Thirty Years' War in 1618 and the Counter Reformation led to a general perception that Protestant Europe was under attack, and increased sensitivity to changes in church practice. This was especially strong in Scotland, which had close economic and cultural links with the Dutch Republic, then fighting for independence from Catholic Spain. In addition, many Scots ministers were commonly educated in French Calvinist universities, which were suppressed in the Huguenot rebellions of the 1620s.

After James died in 1625, attempts to create one church were continued by his son Charles I, who was raised in England and lacked familiarity with Scottish institutions. First imposed on the Church of England, many of his reforms were rejected by English Puritans who wanted a church similar to the Kirk, creating opposition in both countries. In 1636, the Scottish Book of Discipline was replaced by a new Book of Canons, while anyone who denied the king's supremacy in church matters was subject to excommunication. When followed in 1637 by a new Book of Common Prayer, it resulted in a riot, supposedly started when a market-trader named Jenny Geddes threw a stool at the dean of St Giles' Cathedral. Protests quickly spread across Scotland, with hundreds of opponents gathering in Edinburgh.

== Organisation ==
Following the Prayer Book riots, protestors became more organized, and in November 1637 began claiming councillors had encouraged them to elect commissioners to represent their case to the government. This action was endorsed by Sir Thomas Hope, the king's advocate, and the protestors created a nationwide network of committees known as 'Tables', with committee in each shire sending representatives to four Tables in Edinburgh, one each for nobles, shire commissioners, burgh commissioners and ministers. A fifth Table was elected by these four which coordinated the movement as a whole.

In February 1638, Charles declared he was personally responsible for introducing the Prayer Book, rather than his bishops or councillors, and that anyone opposing it was a traitor. His opponents now recognized they were challenging Charles directly and for reasons of self-preservation introduced the Covenant in an attempt to unite the nation behind them. The document itself was drafted by Archibald Johnston, an Edinburgh lawyer, and Alexander Henderson, the minister of Leuchars in Fife.

== Content ==
The National Covenant starts by repeating the Negative or King's Confession, signed in 1581 as an anti-Catholic statement by James VI. This is followed by a list of parliamentary statutes defining the polity and liturgy of the church in Scotland. The Covenant concludes with a bond committing the signatories to stand together to maintain the nation's religion and oppose any changes to it. Signatories were also committed to upholding the king's authority, although it was understood this did not include obedience to an ill-advised king.

The Covenant had the appearance of working within constitutional precedent, contributing to its success in appealing to all areas of Scottish society by drawing on a sense of patriotic outrage at the rule and policies of Charles as an absentee monarch, as well as the provincialization of Scotland within a system dominated by England. The Covenant was also vague enough to avoid putting people off, for example by implicitly supporting Presbyterianism, without explicitly condemning episcopacy. The precise details were less important than the sense that political and religious authority started with the community, rather than with the king.

== Adoption ==
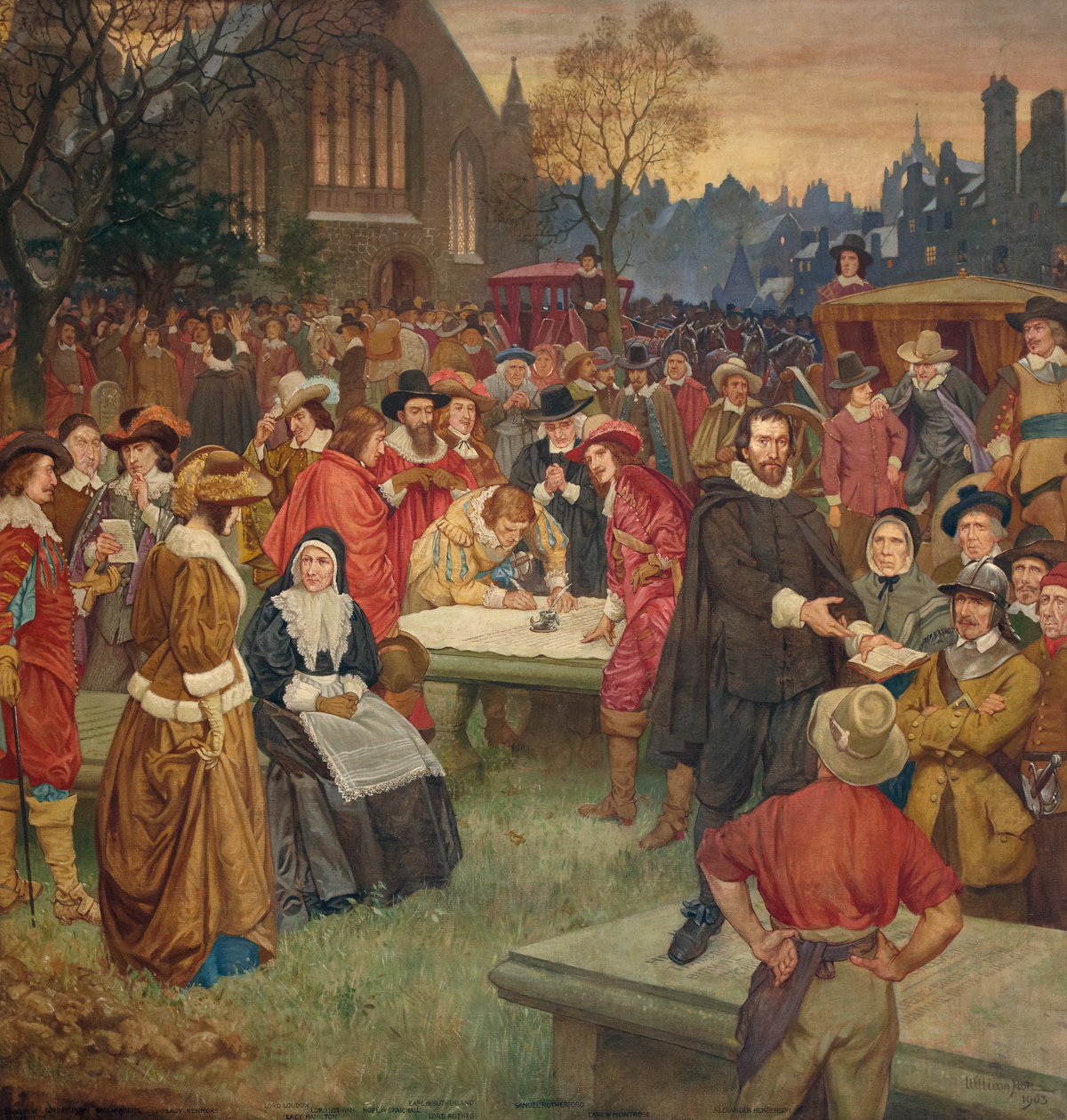
The Signing of the National Covenant in Greyfriars Churchyard, 1638 by William Hole

The National Covenant was first signed on 28 February 1638 at a meeting at Greyfriars Kirk in Edinburgh, and copies were then distributed across Scotland. By the end of May the western highlands, Aberdeenshire and Banff were the only places the Covenant had not been widely accepted, with resistance in these areas being led by George Gordon, the Marquess of Huntly.

In November 1638 the General Assembly of the Church of Scotland met in Glasgow, where it approved the Covenant and passed resolutions abolishing bishops and the use of the new Prayer Book. In August 1638 the privy council agreed that all the king's subjects should subscribe to it, although in November the act was removed from the council's register. In 1640 the Covenant was sanctioned by the Scottish Parliament, and this act would be published under the king's name in 1641.

== Consequences ==
Following the signing of the Covenant it was clear to Charles that his Scottish subjects were in rebellion against him. This would be confirmed when they seized strongholds and began to raise forces. The king responded by hastily gathering his forces and marching on Scotland in 1639, starting the First Bishops' War, where his forces proved no match for the Covenanters. This would be followed in 1640 by the Second Bishops’ War, which concluded with the Treaty of Ripon allowing Scottish forces to remain in control of Northumberland and Durham until a final peace treaty was agreed with the English Parliament. Charles would not be able to disband this Parliament, which began to pass acts limiting his power and leading to the arrest of his councillors. In time, these disputes would lead to the First English Civil War, which started in 1642.

The success of the Covenanters encouraged opponents of the king in his other realms of England and Ireland, with leaders of the Irish Rebellion of 1641 later admitting to being inspired by their example. In 1643 the Covenanters would sign the Solemn League and Covenant with the English Parliament, turning the tide in the First English Civil War.

== See also ==
- Outline of the wars of the Three Kingdoms
- Timeline of the Wars of the Three Kingdoms
- Timeline of the English Civil War

== Sources ==
- BBC (19 September 2014). "The National Covenant & Civil War". www.bbc.co.uk. BBC.
- Cameron, Ewan A. (13 May 2020). "Scotland". Encyclopedia Britannica. Encyclopædia Britannica, Inc.
- Church of Scotland (22 February 2010). "Our Structure". ChurchofScotland.
- Cust, Richard (2015). "The Collapse of Royal Power in England, 1637–1642". In Braddick, Michael J. (ed.). The Oxford Handbook of the English Revolution. OUP Oxford. ISBN 978-0191667275.
- Goodare, Julian (2015). "The Rise of the Covenanters, 1637–1644". In Braddick, Michael J. (ed.). The Oxford Handbook of the English Revolution. OUP Oxford. doi:10.1093/oxfordhb/9780199695898.013.003. ISBN 978-0191667275.
- Helicon (2018). "Bishops' Wars". The Hutchinson Unabridged Encyclopedia with Atlas and Weather Guide. Helicon.
- Kishlansky, Mark A; Morrill, John (2008). "Charles I (1600–1649)". Oxford Dictionary of National Biography (online ed.). Oxford University Press. doi:10.1093/ref:odnb/5143. (Subscription, Wikipedia Library access or UK public library membership required.)
- Lee, Maurice (1974). "James VI and the Revival of Episcopacy in Scotland: 1596–1600". Church History. 43 (1): 50–64. doi:10.2307/3164080. JSTOR 3164080. S2CID 154647179.
- Mason, Roger A. (2007). "National Covenant and Solemn League and Covenant". The Oxford Companion to Scottish History. Oxford University Press. doi:10.1093/acref/9780199234820.001.0001. ISBN 978-0199234820.
- Matthews, Rupert (2003). England Versus Scotland: Great British Battles. Newburn Ford 1640: Leo Cooper. ISBN 978-0850529494.
- McDonald, Alan (1998). The Jacobean Kirk, 1567–1625: Sovereignty, Polity and Liturgy. Routledge. ISBN 185928373X.
- Ó Siochrú, Micheál; Adamson, John; Worden, Blair (2012). "Britain's civil wars: the 15 key moments". HistoryExtra.
- Plant, David (14 December 2006). "The Scottish National Covenant". bcw-project.org. BCW Project.
- Stephen, Jeffrey (2010). "Scottish Nationalism and Stuart Unionism". Journal of British Studies. 49 (1, Scottish Special). doi:10.1086/644534. S2CID 144730991.
- Stevenson, David (2004). "Geddes, Jenny (fl. 1637)". Oxford Dictionary of National Biography (online ed.). Oxford University Press. doi:10.1093/ref:odnb/10488. (Subscription, Wikipedia Library access or UK public library membership required.)
- Stevenson, David (1973). Scottish Revolution, 1637–44: Triumph of the Covenanters. David & Charles. ISBN 0715363026.
- Stewart, Laura A.M. (2016). Rethinking the Scottish Revolution: Covenanted Scotland, 1637–1651. Oxford University Press. ISBN 978-0192563781.
- Wilson, Peter (2009). Europe's Tragedy: A History of the Thirty Years War. Allen Lane. ISBN 978-0713995923.
- Wormald, Jenny (2018). Court, Kirk, and Community: Scotland, 1470–1625. Edinburgh University Press. ISBN 978-0748619399.
