= James Wallace of Auchens =

Scottish Presbyterian soldier (d. 1678)

James Wallace
- Died: 1678; Rotterdam
- Military career
- Rank: Colonel
- Conflicts: Kilsyth, Dunbar, Rullion Green

James Wallace was a Scottish soldier and covenanter. He was the son of Matthew Wallace and Agnes Somervell and succeeded about 1641 to his father's lands at Auchans, Ayrshire. Early in life he adopted the military profession, and became lieutenant-colonel in the parliamentary army. He went to Ireland in the Marquis of Argyll's regiment in 1642, and in 1645 was recalled to oppose the progress of Montrose. He joined the covenanters under General Baillie, and was taken prisoner at the Battle of Kilsyth (Murdoch and Simpson, Deeds of Montrose, 1893, pp. 125, 329). Returning to Ireland before 1647, he was appointed Governor of Belfast in 1649, but was deprived of the office in June of that year. Soon afterwards he removed to Redhall, Ballycarry, near Carrickfergus, where he married in 1649–50. Removing to Scotland in 1650, when Charles II came to Scotland on the invitation of the Scots parliament, Wallace was appointed lieutenant-colonel of a foot regiment under Lord Lorne. At the Battle of Dunbar Wallace was again made prisoner. On his colonel's petition, as a reward for his services, he was ‘referred to the committee of estates, that he may be assigned to some part of excise or maintenance forth of the shire of Ayr.’ Wallace lived in retirement from the Restoration till the Pentland rising, in which he took a very active part as leader of the insurgents. One of Wallace's earliest prisoners in the rising was Sir James Turner, who had been his companion in arms twenty-three years before. During his captivity Turner was constantly with Wallace, of whose character and rebellion he gives a detailed account. On 28 November 1666 Wallace's forces and the king's, under the command of General Dalzell, came within sight of each other at Ingliston Bridge. Wallace was defeated, and, with his followers, took to flight. He escaped to Holland, where he took the name of Forbes. He was condemned and forfeited in August 1667 by the justice court at Edinburgh, and this sentence was ratified by parliament on 15 December 1669. In Holland Wallace was obliged to move from place to place for several years to avoid his enemies, who were on the lookout for him. He afterwards lived in Rotterdam; but on the complaint of Henry Wilkie, whom the king had placed at the head of the Scottish factory at Campvere, Wallace was ordered from Holland. Wallace, however, returned some time afterwards, and died at Rotterdam in the end of 1678.

== Early life ==
James Wallace, usually called Colonel Wallace, leader of the Covenanters at the battle of Pentland Hills, was descended from the Wallaces of Dundonald, a branch of the Wallaces of Craigie. Neither the place nor the year of his birth is known; but in the sentence of death, which was passed against him in absence after the battle of Pentland, he is styled "of Auchens," an estate situated in the parish of Dundonald, in Ayrshire, and which was the family-seat of his ancestors, and most probably his own 'birth-place. Of his education there is equally little known as of the other particulars alluded to.

== Military career ==
He appears, however, to have adopted the military profession at a very early period of life, and having distinguished himself in the parliamentary army was raised to the rank of lieutenant-colonel. He went to Ireland in the Marquis of Argyle's regiment in the year 1642, and in 1645 was recalled to oppose the progress of the Marquis of Montrose. At what period of the straggle Colonel Wallace joined the army of the Covenanters under General Baillie is unknown, but he was at the Battle of Kilsyth, where he was taken prisoner.

== At Charles' return ==
The Battle of Dunbar 1650

In 1650, when Charles II came from the Continent at the entreaty of the Scottish parliament, two regiments being ordered to be embodied of "the choicest of the army, and fittest for that trust," one of horse and another of foot, as his body-guards, Wallace was appointed lieutenant-colonel of the foot regiment, under Lord Lorn, who was colonel. Sir James Balfour, lord lyon king-at-arms, by his majesty's command set down the devices upon the ensigns and colours of these regiments. Those of the lieutenant-colonel [Wallace] were azure, a unicorn argent, and on the other side, in "grate gold leters," these words, "Covenant for religion, king, and kingdoms." At the battle of Dunbar Wallace was again made prisoner; and in the end of that year Lord Lorn, in a petition to the parliament, says, "In respect my lieutenant-colonel has, in God's good providence, returned to his charge, whose fidelity in this cause is well known both in Ireland and in this kingdom, and that his losses are very many and great, I do humbly desire that your majesty and this high court of parliament may be pleased in a particular manner to take notice of him, that he may not only have a company appointed him, but likewise something may be done for the satisfaction of his former losses." Upon this petition the committee of bills reported "that Lieutenant-colonel Wallace may be referred to the Committee of Estates, that he may be assigned to some part of the excise or maintenance forth of the shire of Ayr, or any other of the shires in the south."

== The Pentland Rising ==
Colonel Wallace seems to have lived in retirement from the Restoration till the month of November, 1666, when Maclellan of Barscob, and some other men who had been driven into hiding, happening to fall in with some soldiers whom they found maltreating a poor old countryman. They immediately disarmed the soldiers, and thus spontaneously start the Pentland Rising. Having already committed themselves by helping, they anticipated vengeance from Sir James Turner as one soldier was injured in the confrontation. Therefore, they moved quickly and surprised him with his whole party where he lay, in the town of Dumfries, about sixteen miles distant. Accordingly, having assembled their friends, to the number of about fifty horse with a few foot, they marched into that town upon Thursday, the 15 of November, and made Sir James prisoner with his whole party, wounding only one man. The insurgents on this occasion were led by a Mr. Andrew Gray, a merchant in Edinburgh, who happened by chance to be in that part of the country at the time. Neilson of Corsack, however, was the leader, before whom Sir James Turner, upon being made prisoner, was brought. From this gentleman he obtained quarter and protection; but when Gray, the chief of the party, came up, he insisted upon having him shot upon the spot. They finally, however, set him upon a sorry beast, and carried him about with them in his deshabille, and in this manner proceeded to the market-cross, where they drank the king's health and prosperity to his government. Sir James, however, for some days could not believe but that they intended to hang him when they should find time and place suitable.

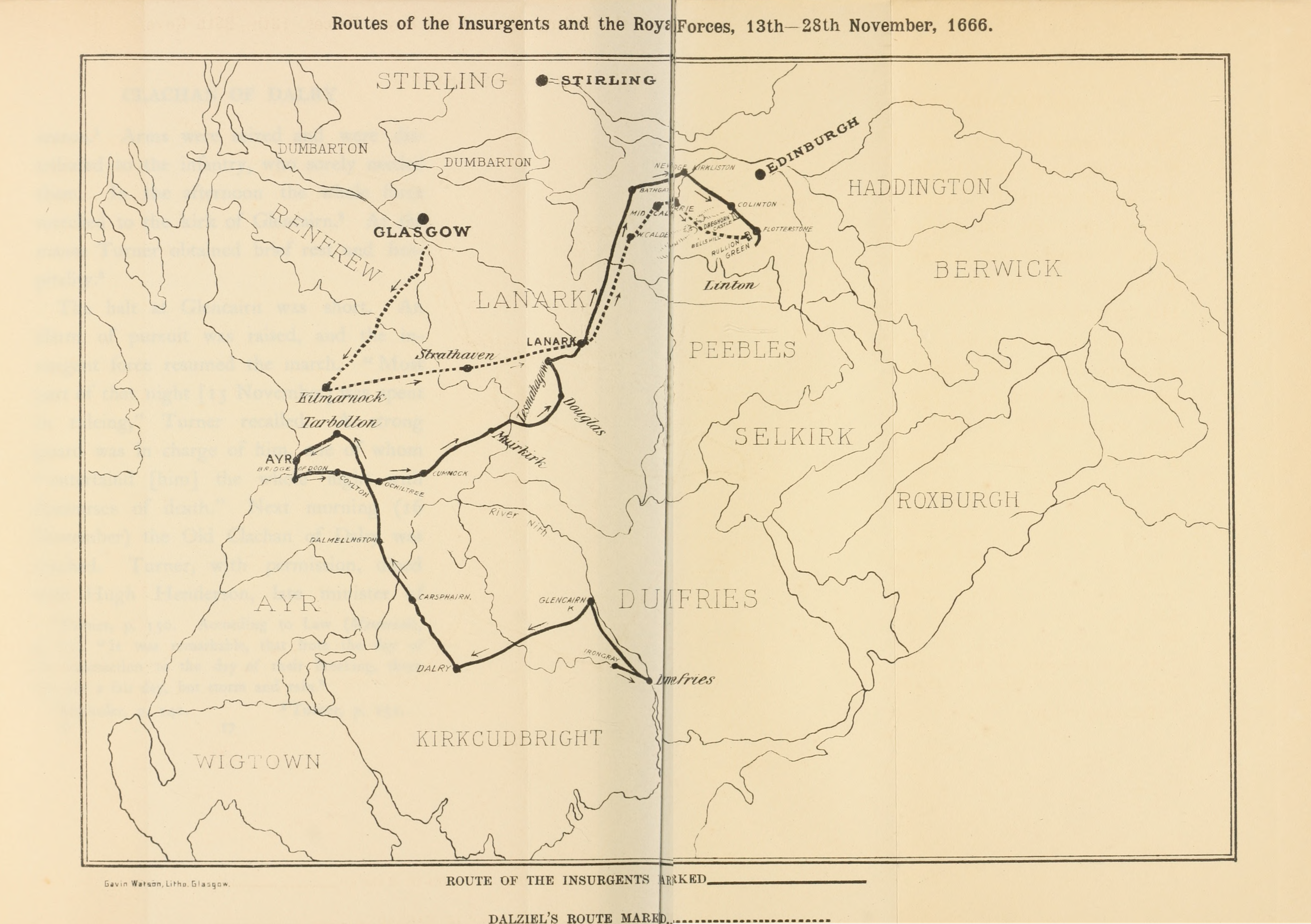
map of Pentland Rising

While these things were transacting in Dumfries, the insurgents and their sympathisers kept up a correspondence by special messengers, and continued deliberating on what was best to be done. Among others, Wallace joined a consultation, which was held at the chambers of Mr. Alexander Robertson in Edinburgh, the same night that Sir James Turner was made prisoner. At this meeting it was resolved to make common cause with the western brethren, and seek redress from government with arms in their hands. Colonel Wallace and a little band of adherents lost no time in proceeding to Ayrshire, in the hope of being reinforced there. They joined the main party on Wednesday 21 November at Brig o' Doon, where he was given military command. They visited successively Mauchline, Ayr, Ochiltree, Cumnock, Muirkirk, and other places on the route; but met with little encouragement in their enterprise. Mr. Robertson, who had been still less successful in procuring assistance, rejoined Wallace, along with Captain Robert Lockhart, and insisted that the undertaking should be abandoned. This counsel was unpalatable to Wallace, but he forthwith sent Maxwell of Monreith to consult with John Guthrie, brother to the celebrated minister of Fenwick, on the subject. Having been reinforced by a small party from Cunningham, under Captain Arnot, the whole body marched to Douglas on Saturday the 24, where at night, after solemn prayer, the proposal of Robertson and Lockhart was carefully considered. It was rejected without one dissenting voice, all being clear that they had a divine warrant for the course they were pursuing. They resolved, therefore, to persevere in it, although they should die at the end of it; hoping that, at least, their testimony would not be given in vain to the cause they had espoused. Two other questions were discussed at this meeting: the renewing of the covenants — to which all agreed; and what should be done with Sir James Turner, whom, for want of any place in which to confine him, they still carried about with them; and who, as a persecutor and murderer of God's people, it was contended by many, ought to have been put to death. As quarter, however, it was alleged, had been granted to him, and as he had been spared so long, "the motion for pistolling him was slighted."

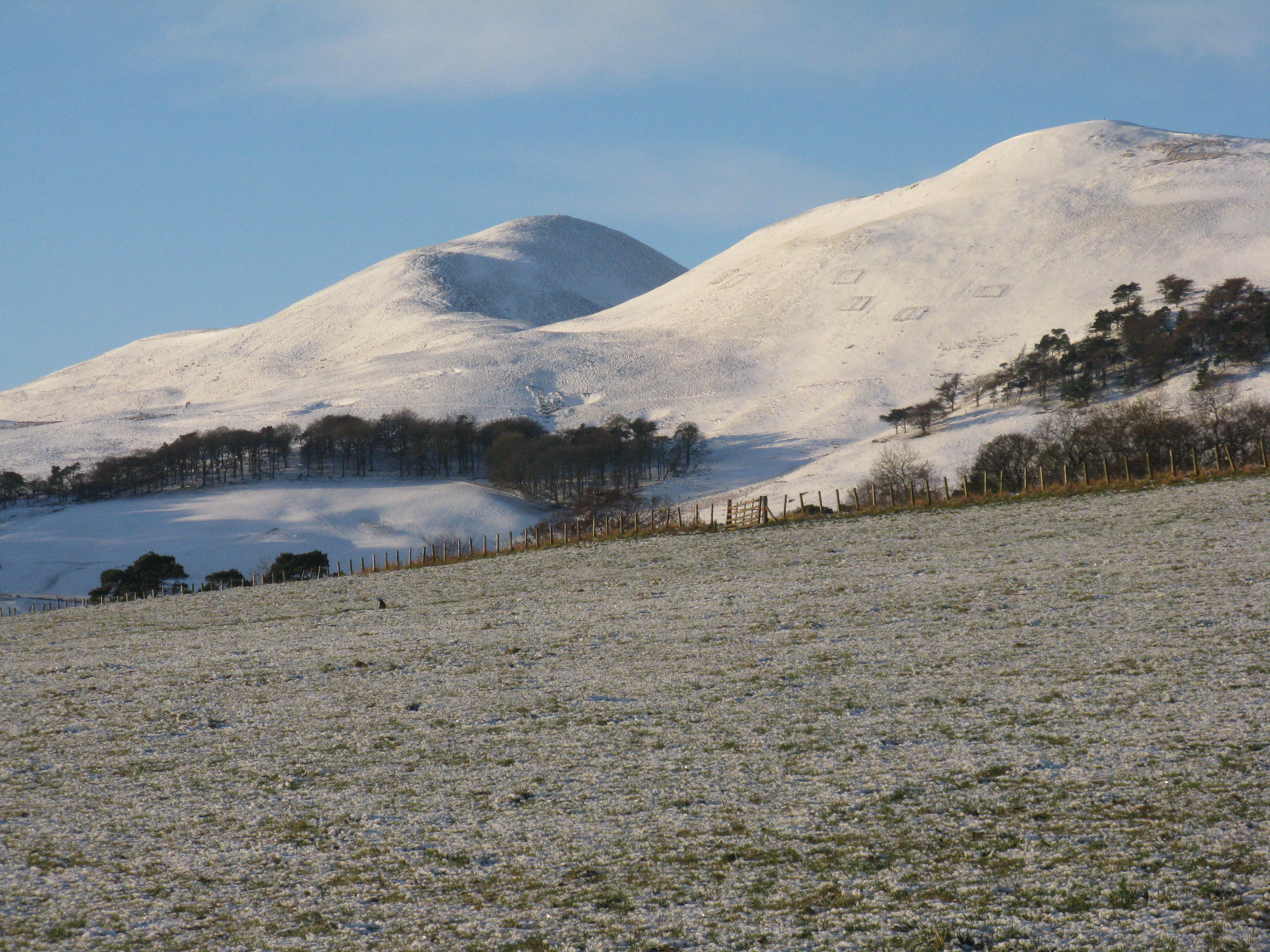
Carnethy Hill and Rullion Green

The next morning, the Sabbath, they marched for Lesmahagow, and passed the house of Robert Lockhart, where Mr. Robertson also was at the time; but neither of the two came out. This day they perfected as well as they could the modelling of their force; but few as their numbers were, they had not the half of the officers requisite: they had not above four or five that had ever been soldiers. At night they entered Lanark, crossing the Clyde near the town. Next day, Monday the 26, guards being set upon the water in a boat to prevent any surprise from the enemy, the covenants were renewed, Mr. John Guthrie preaching and presiding to one part of the army, and ministers misters Gilbert Semple and Crookshanks to the other; and the work was gone about "with as much joy and cheerfulness as may be supposed in such a condition." On this day considerable numbers joined them; and with the view of favouring the rising of their friends, who were understood to be numerous, in Shotts, West Calder, and Bathgate. They marched for Bathgate, but did not reach it till late in the evening. Part of the way a large body of the enemy's horse hung upon their rear; the roads were excessively bad, and the place could not so much as afford them a cover from the rain, which was falling in torrents. The officers went into a house for prayer and to deliberate upon their further procedure, when it was resolved to march early in the direction of Edinburgh, in the hope of reinforcements from there, as well as those they had expected through the day. Scarcely, however, had the meeting broken up, when their guards gave the alarm of the enemy; and though the night was dark and wet in the extreme they set out at twelve o'clock, taking the road through Broxburn, and along the new bridge for Collington. Daylight appeared as they came to the bridge, in the most miserable plight imaginable. From their Edinburgh friends there was no intelligence; and when they drew up on the east side of the bridge there was not a captain with the horse, save one, and the enemy were close at hand, marching for the same bridge. Wallace, however, was a man of singular resolution and of great self-possession. Even in these distressing circumstances he sent a party to occupy the bridge, and marched off the main body of his little army to a rising ground, where he awaited the enemy to give him battle.

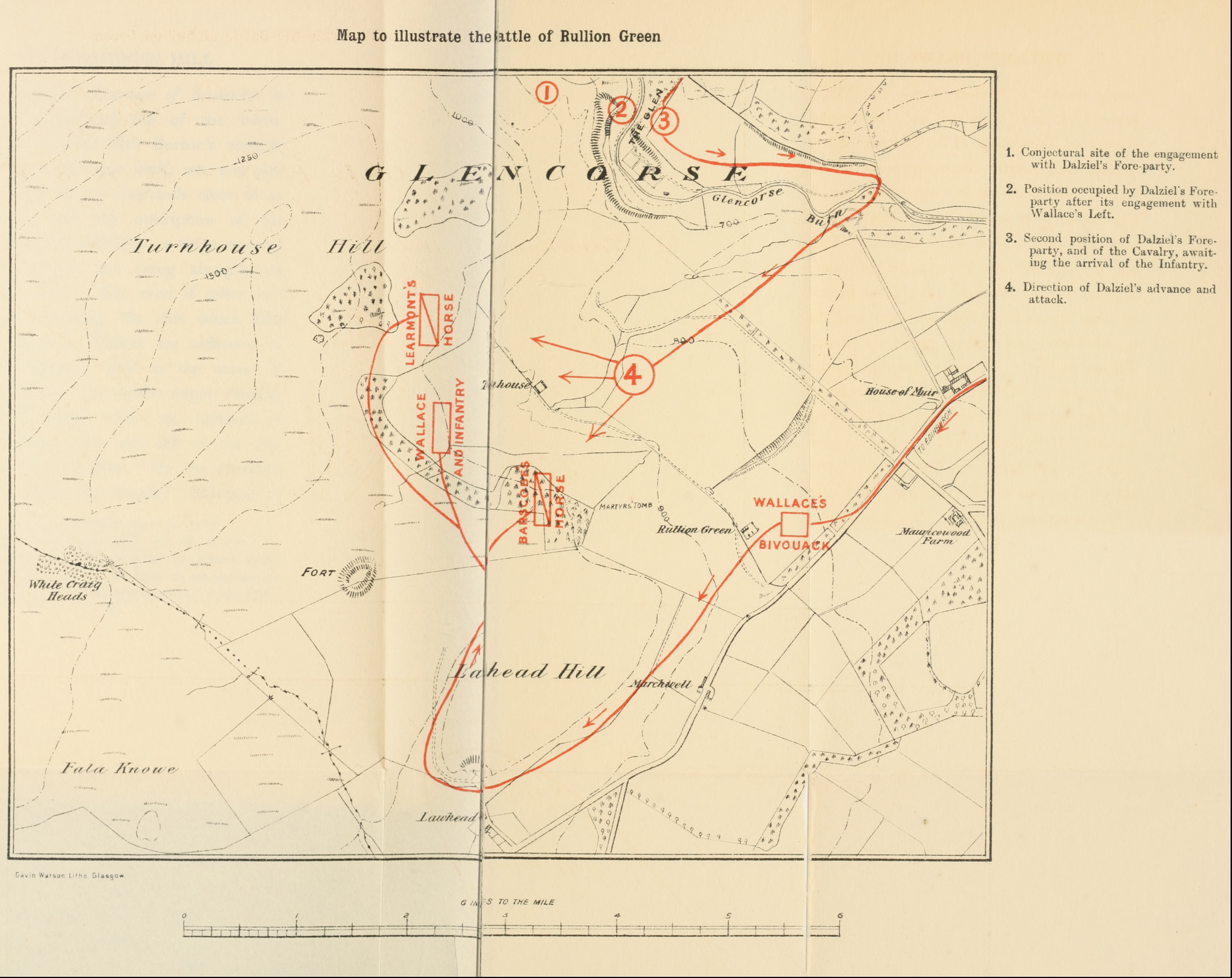
map of Battle of Rullion Green

It was at this critical juncture that Lawrie of Blackwood paid him a second visit, not to assist, but to discourage him, by proposing a second time that he should disband his followers and trust to an indemnity, which he assured him the Duke of Hamilton would exert himself to obtain for them. As he had no credentials to show, and seemed to be speaking merely his own sentiments without the authority of either party, Blackwood's proposal excited suspicions of his motives. He, however, remained with the party, which had now moved on to Collington, all night; and in the morning was the bearer of a letter from Colonel Wallace to General Dalzell, who sent it to the council, while he hastened himself to pursue the insurgents. Wallace in the meantime marched to Ingliston Bridge, at the point of the Pentland Hills, and was in the act of drawing up his little party to prevent straggling when he learned that Dalzell, with the advance of the king's troops, was within half a mile of him. There had been a heavy fall of snow through the night, but it was succeeded by a clear frosty day; and it was about noon of that day, the 28 of November, when the armies came in sight of each other. That of the insurgents did not exceed 900 men, ill-armed, worn out with fatigue, and half starving. The royal army, which amounted to upwards of 3000 men, was in the highest order, and well provided in all respects. Wallace disposed his little army upon the side of a hill running from north to south. The Galloway gentlemen, on horseback, under M'Clellan of Barmagachan, were stationed on the south; the remainder of the horse, under Major Learmont, on the north; and the foot, who were exceedingly ill armed, in the middle. Dalzell seems to have been for some time at a loss how to proceed; having such a superiority, however, in numbers, he detached a party of horse, under General Drummond, to the westward, in order to turn Wallace's left wing. This detachment was met by the Galloway gentlemen, under Captain Arnot and Barmagachan, and completely routed in an instant; and had Wallace been in a condition to have supported and followed up this masterly movement, the king's army would inevitably have lost the day. A second attack was met by Major Learmont with equal spirit; and it was not till after sunset, when Dalzell himself charged the feeble unarmed centre with the strength of his army, horse and foot, that any impression was made upon them. This charge they were unable to resist, but were instantly broken and dispersed. The nature of the ground, and the darkness of the night, favoured their flight, and there were not more than 100 of them killed and taken by the victors; but they were in an unfriendly part of the country, and many of the fugitives were murdered by their countrymen.

Colonel Wallace after the battle left the field, in company with Mr. John Welch, and, taking a north-westerly direction along the hills, escaped pursuit. After gaining what they conceived to be a safe distance from the enemy they turned their horses loose, and slept the remainder of the night in a barn.

== Wallace in Holland ==
Map of Rotterdam by Frederick de Wit (1690) where Wallace fled.

Wallace for some time concealed himself in different parts of the country, and at length escaped to the Continent, where he assumed the name of Forbes. Even there, however, he was obliged to wander from place to place for several years to avoid his enemies, who still continued to seek him out. When the eagerness of the pursuit abated, he took up his residence at Rotterdam, where Scottish ministers Mr. Macward and Mr. John Brown had found an asylum, and were now employed. Following a complaint from one Henry Wilkie, whom the king had placed at the head of the Scottish factory at Campvere, who found his interests suffering by the greater resort of Scottish merchants at Rotterdam, the states-general were enjoined by the British government to send all the three out of their territories. In the case of Wallace the states were obliged to comply, as he had been condemned to be executed as a traitor when he should be apprehended, and his lands forfeited for his majesty's use; but they gave him a recommendation to all kings, republics, &c. &c., to whom he might come, of the most flattering description. In the case of the other two the order seems to have been evaded. Wallace ventured in a short time back to Holland.

== Death and legacy ==
Old Scots Kirk Rotterdam

James Wallace died at Rotterdam in the end of the year 1678, "lamented of all the serious English and Dutch of his acquaintance, who were many; and in particular the members of the congregation of which he was a ruling elder bemoaned his death, and their loss, as of a father." "To the last he testified his attachment to the public cause which he had owned, and his satisfaction in reflecting on what he had hazarded and suffered in its defence." He left one son, who succeeded to his father's property, as the sentence of death and of fugitation, which was ratified by the parliament in 1669, was rescinded at the Revolution.

Among the suffering Scottish exiles there were few more esteemed than Colonel Wallace. Mr. Brown of Wamphray, in a testament executed by him at Rotterdam, in 1676, ordered 100 guineas "to be put into the hands of Mr. Wallace, to be given out by him to such as he knoweth indigent and honest;" and while he leaves the half of his remanent gold to Mr. Macward, he leaves the other half to Mr. Wallace. Mr. Macward, who was honoured to close the eyes of his valued friend and fellow-Christian, exclaims, "Great Wallace is gone to glory; of whom I have no doubt it may be said, he hath left no man behind him in that church, minister nor professor," who hath gone through such a variety of tentations, without turning aside to the right hand or to the left.

== Family ==
In 1649 or 1650 he married a daughter of Mr. Edmonstone of Ballycarry, and left one son, William, who succeeded to his father's property, as the sentence of death and fugitation passed against him after the battle of the Pentland was rescinded at the revolution.

== Bibliography ==
- Wodrow's History, i. 305, 307
- Wodrow's History, ii. passim

== See also ==
- Richard Cameron
- Brown of Wamphray
- Alexander Petrie
- Sir Robert Hamilton
- Robert Fleming
- Robert M'Ward
- John Brown of Wamphray
