= Scots International Church =

Church of Scotland church in Rotterdam

Coordinates: 51.9147°N 4.4796°E

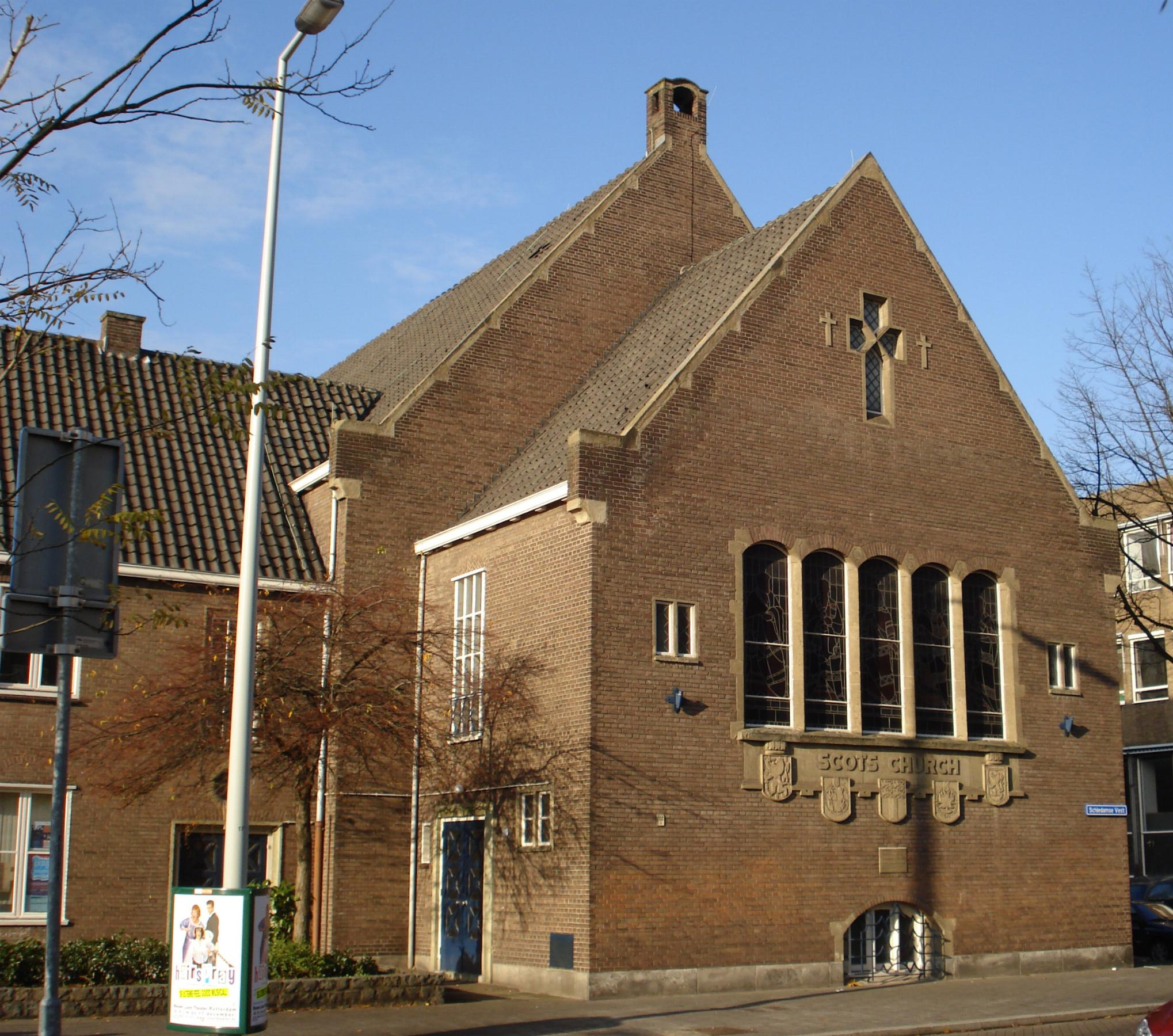
- The Scots International Church, Rotterdam
- Scots International Church
- Country: The Netherlands
- Denomination: Church of Scotland
- Churchmanship: Reformed
- Website: www.scotsintchurch.com

Architecture
- Completed: 1952

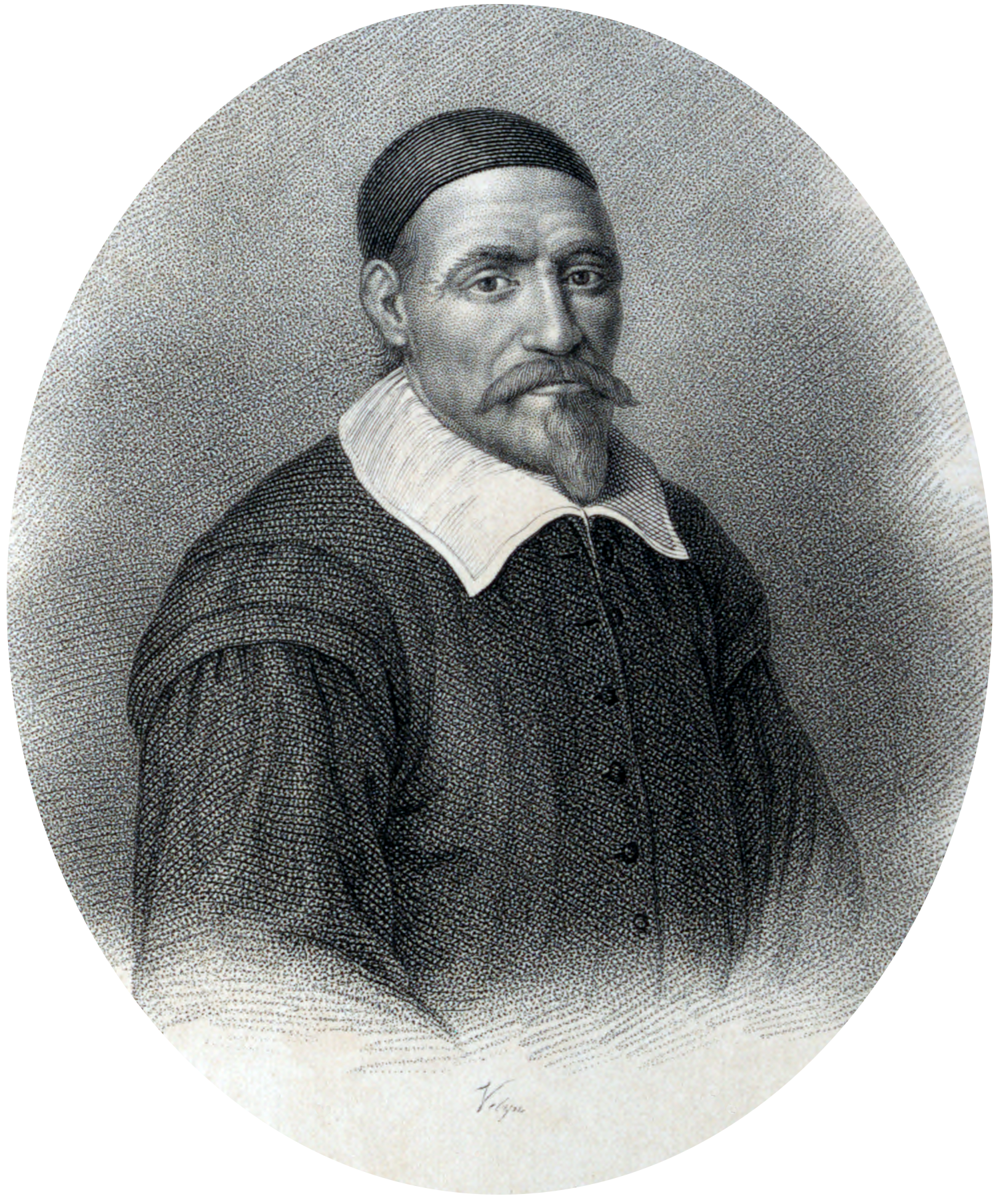
Alexander Petrie, the first minister

The Scots International Church or the Scottish Church (Dutch: Schotse Kerk) is located in Rotterdam, The Netherlands. An English-language Protestant church in the Presbyterian tradition, it is part of the Church of Scotland, within the Church's International Presbytery.

== History ==
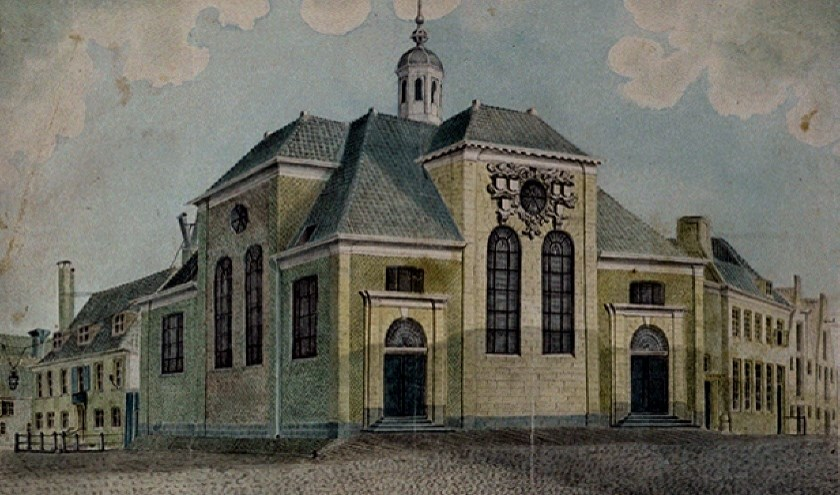
The Scots Church (Schotse Kerk) in 1798

The church was first built in 1643 for the many Scottish merchants, sailors and soldiers who lived in Rotterdam, and was built on behalf of the city. The first Scottish minister was Alexander Petrie, who travelled from Perth in Scotland to take up his position. The Fasti Ecclesiae Scoticanae (1928) states:

The Scottish Church at Rotterdam is one of the most interesting on the Continent. It was founded on 13 September 1643 with Alexander Petrie for its first minister, and, placed officially under the care of the Dutch Classis was accorded all the privileges of the Dutch Church, with full liberty to observe Scottish use and wont for worship. It was the central place of worship for the Scottish Brigade, consisting of three regiments, raised in 1572 for service in the Netherlands under the Earl of Leicester, and left by him there when he returned to England. For over two centuries these regiments aided the States General in their wars with Spain and France. They were always recruited from Scotland, and in 1688, as the earliest standing army in Europe, they formed the nucleus of William the Third's forces. The regimental chaplains were associated with the ministers of this congregation, and, until 1815, the church supported in Rotterdam, the Scottish Poorhouse, on the Schotsche dijk (now Schiedamsche dijk), for the education of orphan children of soldiers, and as a means of dispensing charity to invalided pensioners. The first meeting-place was a house in the Wynstraat, granted by the magistrates. In 1662 the congregation had the use of the ancient chapel of St Sebastian (demolished in 1910) in the Lombardstraat. Here ordination services, forbidden at home, were held by the banished Presbyters during the days of the Covenant. Amongst others, Richard Cameron was set apart to the ministry by Brown of Wamphray and Robert MacWard who (with his hand still upon Cameron's head) is said to have uttered the prophecy, fulfilled within a year: "Here is the head of a faithful minister and servant of Jesus Christ, who shall lose the same for his Master's interest." Colonel Wallace, the leader of the Pentland Rising, was an elder for a considerable time, and Sir Robert Hamilton, leader at Bothwell Bridge, was a communicant. On 13 December 1695, there was laid the foundation of a new church, which was opened in October 1697 by Robert Fleming the younger. All the stone-work was brought from Pittenweem and Queensferry. In 1894 this building underwent a complete renovation. It contains many interesting memorials, and has some valuable communion plate. The ancient pulpit of St Sebastian's has been preserved.

In 1722 the church was extended with a special almshouse for widows and orphans of fallen Scots soldiers.

The 17th-century church was destroyed in the 1940 German bombing of Rotterdam. The Church of Scotland agreed to fund the rebuilding of the church after the war. The current building in the Schiedamse Vest was designed by M. C. A. Meischke. The new building was opened in 1952 by the Moderator of the General Assembly of the Church of Scotland, the Rt Rev Johnstone Jeffrey.

== The present day ==
The current minister is Rev. Graham Austin, who was inducted in 2020 to the charge. He had previously been the minister of Wishaw: St Mark's church. The previous minister was Derek G. Lawson.

Worship takes place at 10:30 each Sunday.

There are 183 members of the church. There may be up to 30 different nationalities in the congregation.

== See also ==
- English Reformed Church, Amsterdam
- St Mary's Church, Rotterdam, Anglican church in Delfshaven
