= John Brown of Wamphray =

Scottish minister in Rotterdam (1610–1679)

John Brown

Personal details
- Born: 1610
- Died: September 1679 (aged 68–69) Rotterdam
- Denomination: Presbyterian
- Spouse: apparently unmarried

John Brown was a Scottish preacher. A supporter of the Scottish Reformation, he refused to follow the episcopal church of the king of England, and preached as a Covenanter.

Brown, of Wamphray, church leader, was probably born at Kirkcudbright; he graduated at the university of Edinburgh 24 July 1630. He was probably not settled till 1655, although he comes first into notice in some highly complimentary references to him in Samuel Rutherford's letters in 1637. In the year 1655 he was ordained minister of the parish of Wamphray in Annandale. For many years he seems to have been quietly engaged in his pastoral duties, in which he must have been very efficient, for his name still lives in the district in affectionate remembrance. After the Stuart restoration he was not only compelled by the acts of Parliament of 1662 to leave his charge, but he was one of a few ministers who were arrested and banished, owing to the ability and earnestness with which they had opposed the arbitrary conduct of the king in the affairs of the church. On 6 November 1662 he was sentenced to be kept a close prisoner in the Tolbooth of Edinburgh, his crime being that he had called some ministers ‘false knaves’ for keeping synod with the archbishop. The state of the prison causing his health to break down, he was banished 11 December from the king’s dominions, and ordered not to return on pain of death. He went to Holland. In 1676 Charles II urged the States-General to banish him from their country, a step which they refused to take. For a few years he was minister of the Scottish church in Rotterdam, and shortly before his death, which occurred in 1679, he took part in the ordination of Richard Cameron.

== Life ==
Robert MacWard who, with John Brown, ordained Richard Cameron in Holland

John Brown probably born and educated at Kirkcudbright; M.A. (Edinburgh, 24 July 1630). Though noticed as a minister by Samuel Rutherford in his correspondence as early as 1637, he was probably not settled in Wamphray earlier than 1655. He was deprived by Act of Parliament 11 June, and Decreet of Privy Council 1 October 1662. On 6 November thereafter, he was accused of reproaching some of his brethren, calling them "perjured knaves and villains," for attending the Diocesan Synod at Glasgow, and was sentenced to be kept a "close prisoner in the Tolbooth of Edinburgh." After being there five weeks, to the impairing of his health and danger of his life, he petitioned for a release. This was granted on condition of "obliging himself to remove and depart off the king's dominions, and not to return without licence from his majesty and council, under pain of death." He went to Rotterdam in March 1663, and ministered in the Scots Church there. In 1677, in consequence of repeated representations from King Charles, Brown and two others were ordered by the Dutch Government to withdraw from Rotterdam. He retired to Utrecht, but returned to Rotterdam in 1678, and died there in September 1679. Shortly before his death, he took part in the ordination of Richard Cameron.

At the time of his death he was aged about 69, and apparently unmarried. His wealth consisted in his library. He bequeathed by his will, dated 2 April 1676, "one hundred guineas to the poor of the Scottish congregation, Rotterdam, after the selling of his books," "specially excepting the Complutensian Bible in six volumes, which he gave to his endeared friend and brother, Robert M'Ward."

== Works ==
He was the author of many learned and elaborate works, among which were

- ‘Apologetical Relation of the Sufferings of Ministers of the Church of Scotland since 1660,’ 1665
- ‘Libri duo contra Woltzogenium et Velthusium,’ 1670
- ‘De Causà Dei adversus anti-Sabbatarios,’ 2 vols. 4to, 1674–76
- ‘Quakerism the Pathway to Paganism,' 1678
- ‘An Explanation of the Epistle to the Romans,' 1679
- ‘The Life of Justification opened,' 1695.
- Other treatises were published between 1720 and 1792, and a manuscript history of the church is in the university library at Edinburgh. Of his treatise on justification a writer says: ‘It is by far our most thorough exposition and dismission of the doctrine it handles; and it is all the more to be prized because of the particular bearing it has on the new views which Baxter and others had begun to propagate, and which in some shape are ever returning among ourselves’.
- An Apologeticall Relation of the Sufferings of Ministers and Professors of the Church of Scotland (anon., 1665; Edinburgh, 1846);
- Libri duo : in priori Wolzogium, . . . in posteriori Lamberti Velthusii (Amstel, 1670)
- De causa Dei contra Anti-Sabbatarios, 2 vols. (Rotterdam, 1674-6);
- Christ the Way, and the Truth, and the Life (Rotterdam, 1677; Edinburgh, 1839);
- Quaherisme the Pathway to Paganisme (Rotterdam, 1678);
- The History of the Indulgence (1678).
- Also the following posthumous works : —
- The Life of Faith in Times of Trial (1679);
- The Sworn Song, or Second Part (1680);
- The Life of Justification Opened (1695);
- Christ in Believers the Hope of Glory (Edinburgh, 1703);
- A Pious and Elaborate Treatise concerning Prayer (1720; another edition, Glasgow, 1745);
- A Vindication of Fellowship Meetings, and of hearing Suffering Ministers (Edinburgh, 1740);
- An Explanation of the Epistle to the Romans (Edinburgh, 1769);
- Enoch's Testimony Opened (Edinburgh, 1771);
- The Mirror, or a Treatise on the Law and Gospel (Glasgow, 1792);
- Letters concerning the Third Indulgence (M'Ward's Earnest Contendings);
- a MS. History of the Church (in Latin) is in the Univ. Library, Edinburgh
- a MS. on Indefinite Ordination in Wodrow MSS., Advocates' Library, Edinburgh.

== Bibliography ==
- Wodrow's History of the Sufferings of the Church of Scotland from the Restoration to the Revolution:
- Memoir prefixed to reprint of Apologetical Relation in the Presbyterian Armoury, Vol. iii. Edin. 1846
- Scott's Fasti, ii. 663.
- Rutherfurd's Letters
- Wodrow's History, i. 304, iv. 500
- Lockerby's Life
- Steven's Scottish Church Rotterdam
- M'Crie's Mem. of Veitch
- Edinburgh Christian Instructor, xxi.
- The Scots Worthies
- Walker's Scottish Theology and Theologians,
- Dict. Nat. Biog.

== See also ==
- Donald Cargill
- John Spreul
- Robert MacWard
