= James Hyslop (poet) =

Scottish poet

James Hyslop (23 July 1798 – 1827) was a Scottish poet.

== Life ==
Hyslop was born in the parish of Kirkconnel, Dumfriesshire, an illegitimate son of Margaret Lambie (1778–1845) and William Hyslop (born 1775); his grandfather was an elder at Kirkconnel parish church where Richard Cameron was buried. He was early put out to farm-work, but taught himself languages and mathematics. He later went to live with his grandfather and attended school at Sanquhar. From 1812 to 1816 he was engaged as a shepherd on Nether Wellwood farm, in the parish of Muirkirk. Between 1816 and 1818 he was employed at Corsebank; from there he wrote a poetical epistle to his early Kirkconnel teacher, signed "James Hislop", but later always used the spelling "Hyslop".

In 1818 Hyslop went to Greenock, where he opened a day-school, and wrote for the Edinburgh Magazine. At first he was fairly successful, but his prospects were blasted by having to pay a large sum for which he had become security. Leaving Greenock in 1821, he obtained a post as tutor on board HMS Doris, bound for South America. The voyage lasted for three years, and an account of part of the voyage, with impressions of the scenery, natural history and social conditions of Brazil, was given by Hyslop in a series of eleven papers contributed to the Edinburgh Magazine, May–November 1825.

Hyslop was next engaged as a reporter in London in 1826, where he was intimate with Allan Cunningham, Edward Irving, and others; but the work proved too heavy for him, and he again took to teaching, first as superintendent of a charity school, and afterwards as tutor on board HMS Tweed. The vessel sailed for the Cape of Good Hope in October 1827, and on 4 November Hyslop died of fever contracted on the island of Santiago, Cape Verde. His body was consigned to the sea with military honours.

== Works ==
Hyslop is known for his poem, The Cameronian Dream.

While a shepherd at Nether Wellwood, near the scene of the battle where Richard Cameron was killed, Hyslop had been familiar with the story of the Scottish Covenanters whose experiences he described. Among his 82 poems collected in 1887 by Peter Mearns, The Scottish Sacramental Sabbath, The Scottish National Melody, and The Child's Dream were also popular in Scotland.

Most of Hyslop's poetry published during his lifetime appeared in the Edinburgh Magazine, from 1819. He wrote also in prose, mainly on the Covenanters. Two essays in the Edinburgh Magazine, 1820, were "A Defence of Modern Scottish Poetry", and "An Account of an Apparition in Airsmoss". Contributions to the Greenock Advertiser and other newspapers were frequently signed "The Muirkirk Shepherd".
