= John Spreul (apothecary) =

17th c. apothecary and Covenanter

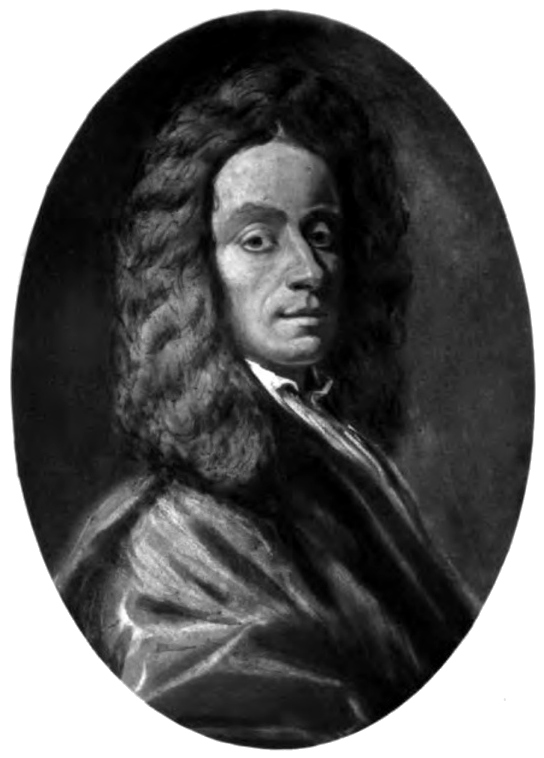
- Portrait of Spreul by Godfrey Kneller
- Born: 1646
- Died: November 1722 (aged 75–76)
- Citizenship: Scot
- Occupations: apothecary; fund-raiser; pearl merchant; fish processor
- Spouse(s): 1. Isobel Clarke (died while John was in prison); 2. Margaret Wingate
- Children: 9
- Relatives: John Spreul
- Writing career
- Subjects: Pearls, Wine, Anglo-Scottish trade

John Spreul or Bass John (1646—November 1722) worked as an apothecary in Glasgow. He got his nickname for being imprisoned on the Bass Rock for around six years on the charge of being present at outdoor religious meetings. Some 17th century church services were attended by armed defensive militia since the regime sent soldiers who attacked those at unauthorised meetings. A verdict of not proven was returned on charges that he supported those defeated at Bothwell Bridge. Despite being tortured, twice, using the boot, Spreul confessed no wrong-doing. Spreul's wife died while he was in prison and he petitioned for his full release, rather than being sent to the American plantations as a slave, when in 1686 there were some concessions from the regime. Spreul was liberated but initially refused to leave since the release order contained statements which he regarded as falsehoods. After freedom, he seems to have quickly gained prominence and became a successful businessman being involved in fish processing and pearl trading. In 1696, he led a national fund-raising campaign to buy back Scots captured by Barbary pirates. He was an author, writing on the trade between Scotland and England, and became a supporter of the Darien Scheme. Spreul was elected as a burgess in 17 Scottish towns in the late 17th and early 18th centuries.

== Early life ==
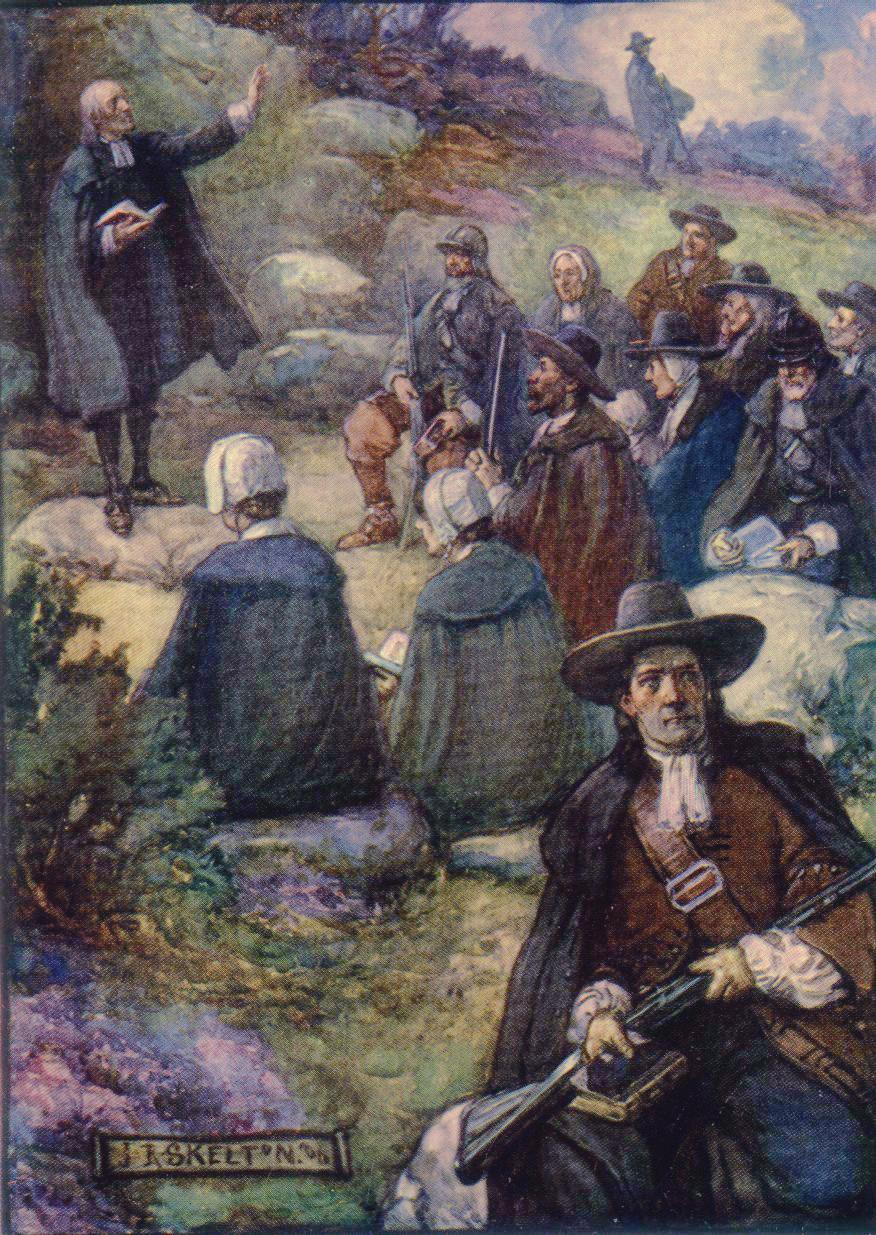
Depiction of a conventicle in progress, from H. E. Marshall's Scotland's Story 1906

John's father, who was born in 1607, was Bailie John Spreull, merchant in Paisley. His father's family were descended from the Spreulls of Cowden. John's mother was Janet Alexander. She was the daughter of Bailie James Alexander, a Paisley merchant, and Janet Maxwell of Pollok. John was the second son of John an Janet Spreul. John first became an apothecary in Paisley and then later in Glasgow. An apothecary would sell herbs and drugs for medical uses. Jardine suggests he may have sold opium. He is also sometimes later called a merchant of Glasgow.

Mr Spreul's troubles began very soon after the Pentland Rising. His father, John Spreul, merchant in Paisley, was fined by Middleton, although he had suffered for his refusing the tender; he paid the one half of his fine, and being prosecuted for the other, or rather his refusing the declaration, he was forced, with many other worthy persons, to abscond. When General Tam Dalyell came to Kilmarnock in the year 1667, a party of soldiers were sent to Paisley, and took Mr Spreul prisoner, merely because he would not tell them where his father was. At that time, after many terrible threatenings of being shot to death, roasted at a fire, and the like, and some short confinement, he was dismissed.

In 1677, he was, with Aikenhead and many other gentlemen, cited before a court in Glasgow. Finding that severity was designed against all that appeared in court, Mr. Spreul absented, and was with several other persons denounced and intercommuned, though nothing was laid to their charge but mere nonconformity. This obliged him to quit his house and shop, and go abroad, sometimes to Holland, France and Ireland, and merchandise.

He was in Ireland with his uncle Mr James Alexander in May 1679, and came over to Scotland after the Battle of Drumclog in June, and went to his house at Crawford's Dyke, where understanding the conduct of the west country army, he had no freedom to join them, though his own brother James Spreul, and two cousins, John Spreul writer, and John Spreul merchant in Glasgow, were with them in arms. His business obliged him to be with some in that army, but he never joined them.

After the defeat at Bothwell Bridge he absconded again, however his wife and family was turned out of his house and shop, and all the moveables secured. Within a little he retired to Holland, and stayed there some time.

== Imprisonment ==
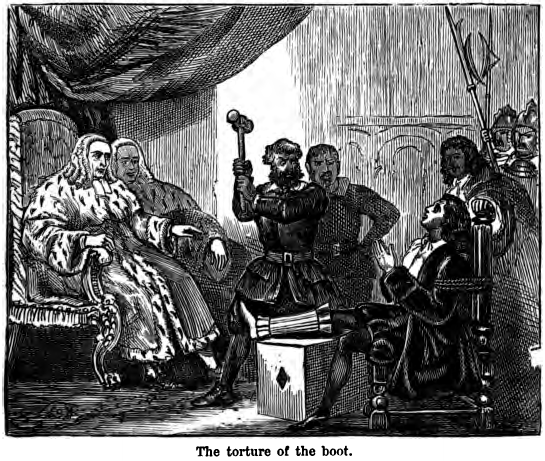
The Torture of the Boot

Spreul returned from Holland in order to take his wife and children to Rotterdam. On 12 November 1680, he was apprehended by men looking for Donald Cargill, and being brought before the Council, was examined, and afterwards put to the torture before a Committee of their number. Not getting him to confess what they desired by torturing him in the new boot, they sent for the old one, and tortured him over again; and being equally unsuccessful with it, Dalziel alleged that the hangman favoured him; upon which the hangman said, he struck with all his might, and bade him take the mallet himself to do it better. On 2 March 1681, Spreul was indicted before the High Court of Justiciary on the charge of treason and rebellion, for alleged accession to the insurrection at Bothwell Bridge. The proof, however, failed, and a verdict of not proven was returned by the jury. Spreul's lawyer was Lockhart; those who did not recognise the courts generally did not employ lawyers. Upon this, instead of being liberated, he was still kept prisoner; and, on pretext of being present at field conventicles he was fined £500 sterling, and sent to the Bass, by an act of Privy Council, July 14, 1681. The order for transport is recorded as 16 August 1681. Here he continued for nearly six years. The act of Council for his liberation is dated 12 May 1687. He was the last prisoner who was released from the Bass. He survived the Revolution many years.

== Wodrow's trial account ==
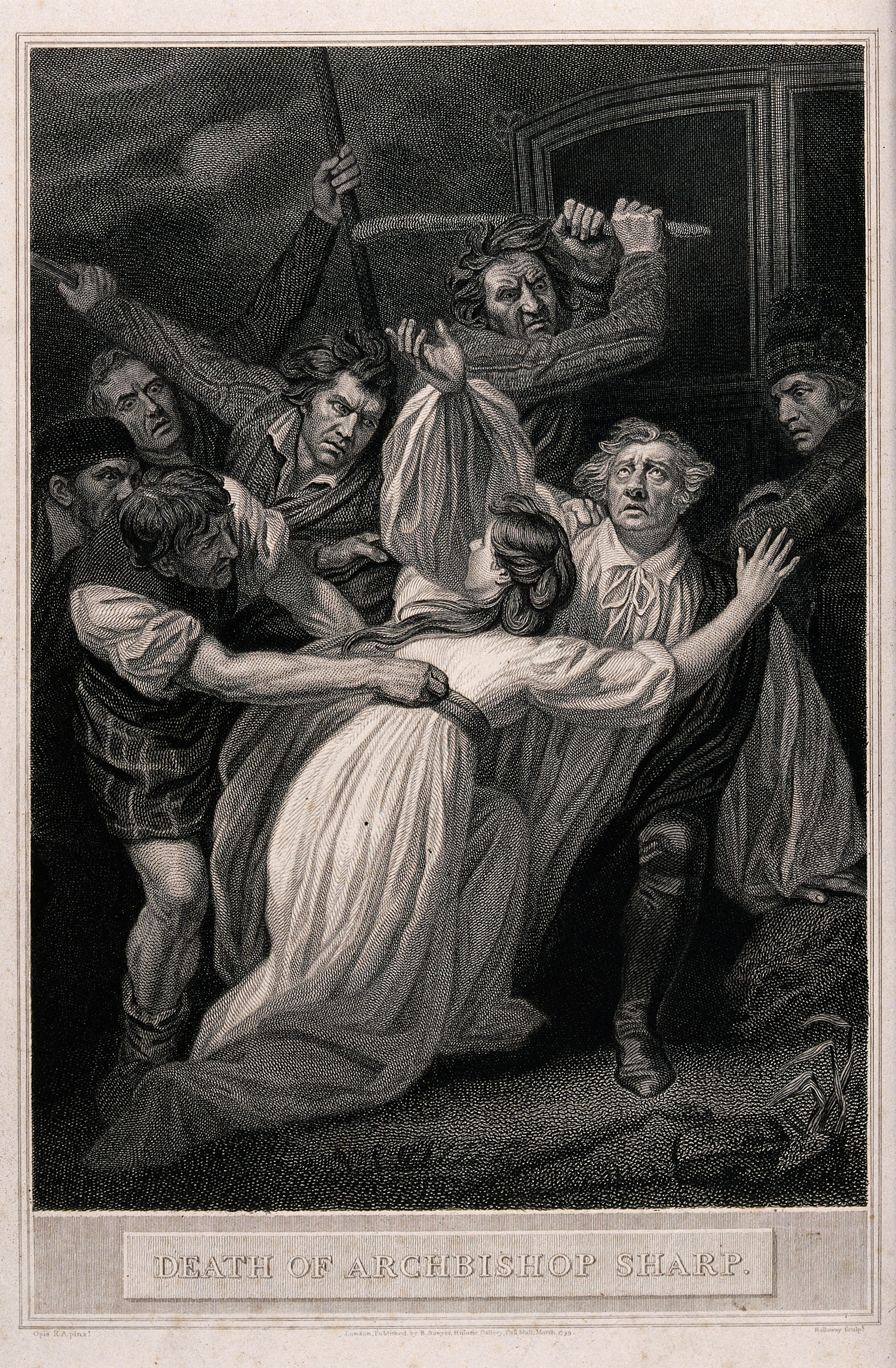
The killing of Archbishop Sharpe

According to the council registers, Spreul was examined 13 November 1680, but his answers are not recorded there. Spreul's own account, as far as he could remember, was recorded by Wodrow. His examination is given below.
Q: Were you at the killing of the archbishop?
A: I was in Ireland at that time.
Q: Was it a murder?
A: I know not, but by hearsay, that he is dead, and cannot judge other men's actions upon hearsay. I am no judge, but in my discretive judgment I would not have done it, and cannot approve it.
Q: He was again urged-; but do you not think it was murder?
A: Excuse me from going any further; I scruple to condemn what I cannot approve, seeing there may be a righteous judgment of God, where there is a sinful hand of man, and I may admire and adore the one when I tremble at the other.
Q: Were you at Drumclog?
A: I was at Dublin then.
Q: Did you know nothing of the rebels rising in arms when in design?
A: No; the first time I heard of it was in coming from Dublin to Belfast in my way home, where I heard that Claverhouse was resisted by the country people at Drumclog.
Q: Was not that rebellion?
A: I think not; for I own the freedom of preaching the gospel, and I hear, what they did was only in self-defence.
Q: Were you at Bothwell with the rebels?
A: After my return from Ireland I was at Hamilton seeking in money, and clearing counts with my customers, so I went through part of the west country army, and spoke with some there, since the king's highway was as free to me as to other men; but I neither joined them as commander, trooper, nor soldier.
Q: Was that rising rebellion?
A: I will not call it rebellion, I think it was a providential necessity put on them for their own safety, after Drumclog.
This confession of his he was urged to subscribe, but absolutely refused it.

Kirkton records that even in Dumfries, at the beginning of the Pentlands Rising, the insurgents drank the king's health and M'Crie, over about 8 pages, argues repeatedly that although they rose in arms, they were not rebels. He says those involved in the rising regarded it as "sinless self-defence" and they were wanting justice rather than seeking to overthrow the king or his government.

== Wodrow's account of the torture ==
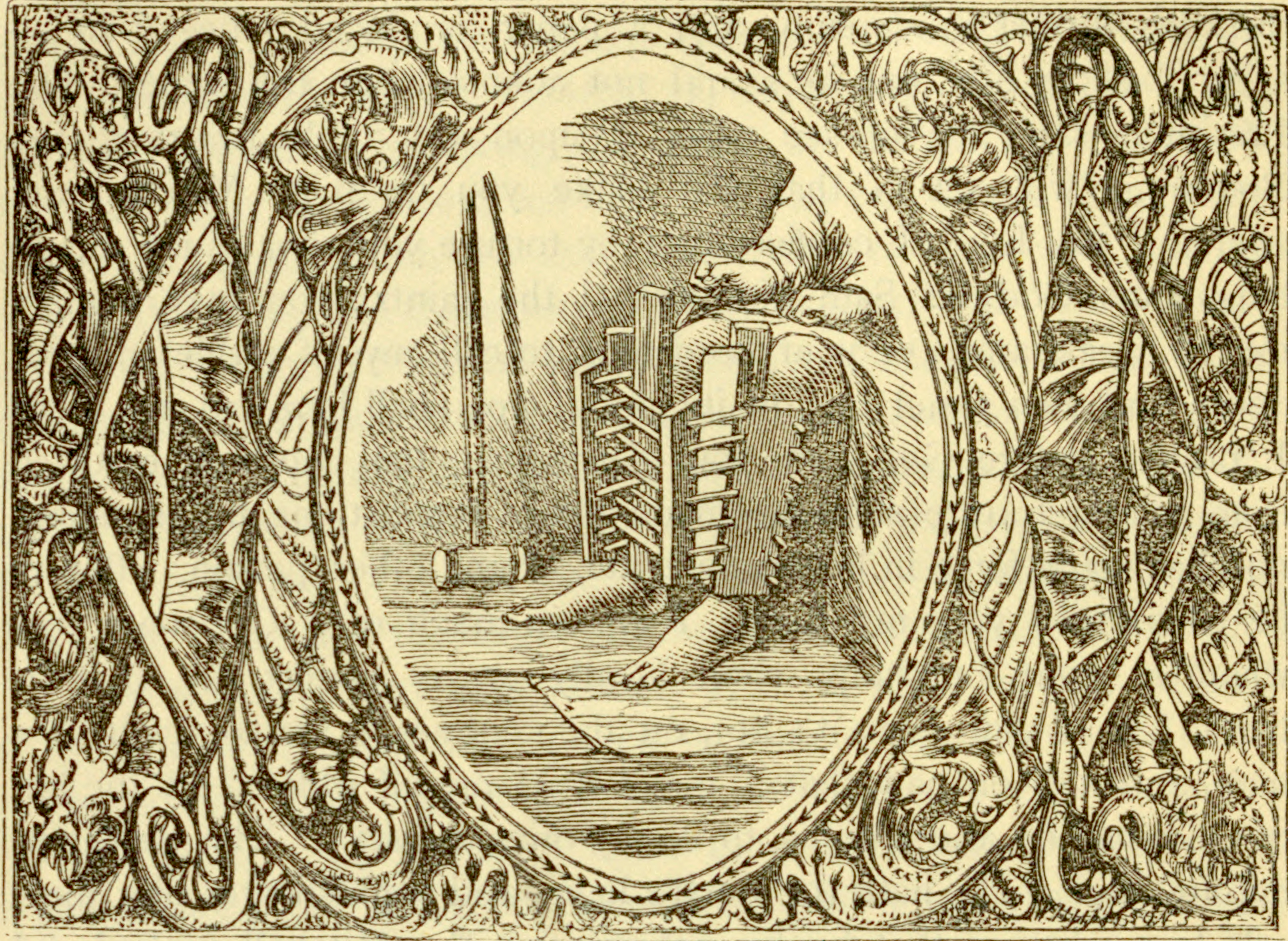
The Boots from Scots Worthies

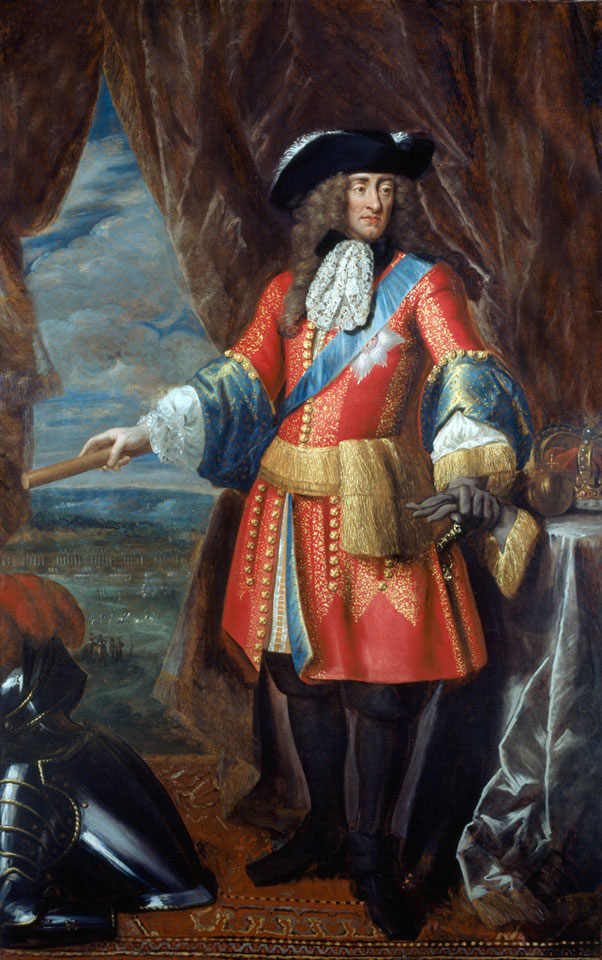
The Duke of York (later James VII) was the younger brother of Charles II. and later his heir before James was deposed to make way for William and Mary. James described Spreul as more dangerous than five hundred ordinary people.

Wodrow records, "Mr Spreul before the council, on November 15, confesseth he was in company with Mr Cargill in Edinburgh, but will not discover in what house, and adds, that there was nothing betwixt them but salutations." Mr Spreul having come from Ireland in the time of Bothwell, and being just now come from Holland, and owning he had been in company with Mr Cargill, the managers were of opinion that he could give them more information: and now being got into the inhuman way of putting people to the torture, and A. Stuart being examined this way, November 15, that same day the council pass the following act. "The lords of his majesty's privy council having good reason to believe, that there is a principle of murdering his majesty, and those under him, for doing his majesty's service, and a design of subverting the government of church and state, entertained and carried on by the fanatics, and particularly by Mr Donald Cargill, Mr Robert Macwaird, and others their accomplices, and that John Spreul and Robert Hamilton have been in accession thereunto, ordain them to be subjected to the torture, upon such interogatories as relate to these three points:
1st. By what reason and means that murdering principle is taught and carried on; who were accessory to the contrivance of murdering; who were to be murdered; and also as to the archbishop of St Andrews's murder.
2nd. If there was any new rebellion intended; by what means it was to be carried on; who were to bring home the arms; if any be brought or bought, and by whom; who were the contrivers and promoters of the late rebellion at Bothwell-bridge.
3d. Who were their correspondents abroad and at home, particularly at London, or elsewhere; what they know of bringing home or dispersing seditious pamphlets, and such other particulars as relate to those generals. And give full power and commission to the earls of Argyle, Linlithgow, Perth, and Queensberry, treasurer-depute, register, advocate, justice-clerk, general Dalziel, Lord Collington, and Haddo, to call and examine the said persons in torture, upon the said interrogatories, and such other as they shall find pertinent upon the said heads, and report."

The Lord Haltoun was preses of this committee, and the Duke of York and many others were present. The preses told Mr Spreul, that if he would not make a more ample confession than he had done, and sign it, he behoved to underly the torture. Mr Spreul said, "He had been very ingenuous before the council, and would go no further; that they could not subject him to torture according to law; but if they would go on, he protested that his torture was without, yea, against all law; that what was extorted from him under the torture, against himself or any others, he would resile from it, and it ought not to militate against him or any others; and yet he declared his hopes, God would not leave him so far as to accuse himself or others under the extremity of pain." Then the hang-man put his foot in the instrument called the boot, and, at every query put to him, gave live strokes or thereby upon the wedges. The queries were, whether he knew anything of a plot to blow up the Abbey and duke of York? who was in the plot, and where Mr Cargill was, and if he would subscribe his confession before the council? To these he declared his absolute and utter ignorance, and adhered to his refusing to subscribe. When nothing could be elicited by this, they ordered the old boot to be brought, alleging this new one used by the hangman was not so good as the old, and accordingly it was brought, and he underwent the torture a second time, and adhered to what he had before said. General Dalziel complained at the second torture, that the hangman did not strike strongly enough upon the wedges; he said he struck with all his strength, and offered the general the mall to do it himself. Mr Spreul was very firm, and wonderfully supported, to his own feeling in body and spirit, during the torture. When it was over, he was carried to prison on a soldier's back, where he was refused the benefit of a surgeon.

== Release order and Spreul's refusal ==
In May 1687 an order is granted to liberate John Spreul. Favours were now shown to the prisoners; and after near seven years' imprisonment, Mr Spreul sent a petition to the council, which follows from the original.

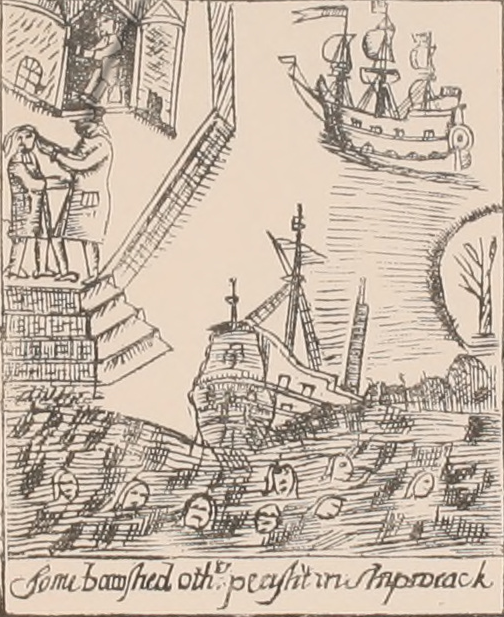
Some prisoners like Robert Dick were forced into servitude or slavery in the newly established colonies in America or the West Indies. They travelled on ships such as the Carolina Merchant and the Henry & Francis

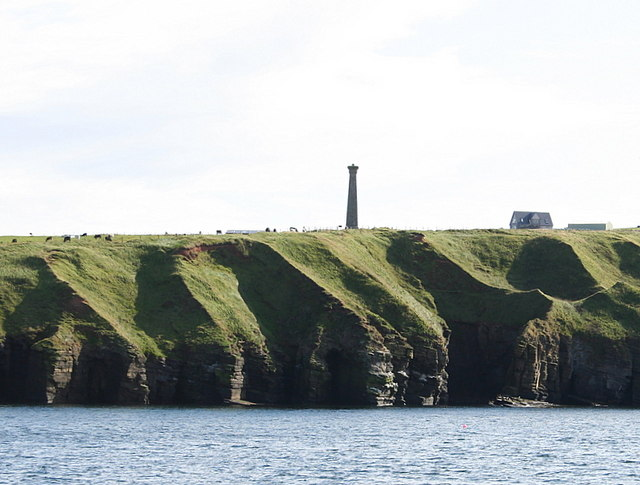
The Covenanters' Memorial at Deerness Orkney where the Crown of London was shipwrecked on 10 December 1679 while transporting slaves from Leith before crossing the Atlantic.

"Whereas it is not unknown to your lordships, how that your lordships' petitioner, after his first imprisonment, was put to the extremity of the torture two several times, the which having sustained, was thereby assoiled by the laws of this and all other nations. Thereafter, when he was indicted, he was also cleared by the verdict of the whole assize, and thereupon assoiled by the lords of the justiciary; and at last being libelled before your lordships by his majesty's advocate, who could prove nothing against him, yet your lordships being pleased to fine him, and continue his imprisonment so long, because he had not freedom to depone upon the libel, the reasons wherefore he could not, being not only from grounds in law, but especially from conscience, and his obligation and respect to the gospel of Jesus Christ, which are at more length expressed in his information, together with a touch at a few of the great losses he hath sustained both before and since his imprisonment (what by sea, the great fire at Glasgow, house and shop taken from his wife in his absence, also by bad debtors, and through his imprisonment all is prescribed by law (that is due him) after three years past, the goods taken from him by major Johnston, and the death of his wife, and other great expenses since his imprisonment, (being these six years and five months) all which he humbly offereth to your lordships' consideration and pity. May it therefore please your lordships, to grant your lordships' petitioner liberty to follow his lawful calling in his native country, at least in any other nation where he may with best conveniency, not that he petitioneth for his own banishment, (and so to be sold as a slave, the which he would not be ashamed of, for the gospel's sake, if he be called of the Lord to it,) but the liberty of a freeborn subject is that he humbly begs, at least liberty a competent time to see if by law he can obtain any thing of his debtors to maintain himself in prison, seeing nothing hath been hitherto allowed him out of the goods taken from him by major Johnston, neither out of the treasury."

May 13, 1687, the council grant the following- act of liberation. "The lords of his majesty's privy council, having considered an address made in behalf of John Spreul apothecary in Glasgow, now prisoner in the isle of the Bass, supplicating for liberty, in regard of his majesty's late gracious proclamation, do hereby give order and warrant to Charles Maitland, lieutenant-governor of the isle of the Bass, to set the said John Spreul at liberty, he having found caution acted in the books of council, to appear before the council once in June next, under the penalty of one thousand pounds Scots money, in case of failie. Extracted by me, Colin Mackenzie, Cl. Secr. Concilii." When this order comes to the Bass, Mr Spreul was unwilling to take his liberty upon any terms that to him appeared inconsistent with the truths he was suffering for; and he apprehended this order involved him in an approbation of the proclamation specified, which he was far from approving. So much he signified to the governor of the Bass, and continued some time in prison, till a letter came over requiring the governor to set open doors to him, and tell him he was at liberty to go, or stay, as he pleased. Whereupon, after so long an imprisonment, he chose to come out under a protestation against what he took to be wrong in the orders and proclamation, and went over to Edinburgh, and waited on the counsellors, thanked them for allowing him liberty, and verbally renewed his protest against the proclamation and orders.

== Later life ==
James Sproule relates that "Bass John was present as a witness when King William and Queen Mary received the instrument of government and consented to the Claim of Rights which he himself had helped to draw up." He also relates that "in 1696 a campaign was launched to pay ransoms to free Scots held by the Barbary pirates of North Africa. John Spreull, merchant, headed a country-wide drive to collect money to pay said ransoms." Later in life John Spreul was known for trade in pearls, especially Scottish pearls. A necklace made from his pearls was sold to Anne, Queen of Great Britain. Spreul is also recorded as having a large fish processing operation where red herring was cured. This was at a site in Crawfurd's-dike on the east side of Greenock. John William Burns says in his preface that "Bass John took an active part in the politics of his day, and was one of the largest subscribers to the Darien Scheme", investing 1000 pounds. Alexander Shields, also a prisoner on the Bass, went as a preacher to Darien.

== Bass John in poetry ==
After his release Bass John took as motto on his crest the words, "Sub pondere cresco" which translates as "under weight I grow" or "I thrive under burdens". Agnes H. Bowie wrote a poem called The Martyr's Crest which is about John Spreul.

== Works ==
- Miscellaneous writings with some papers relating to his history, ... Spreull, John, 1646-1722
- An Accompt Current betwixt Scotland and England balanced; together with an Essay of a Scheme of the Product of Scotland, as also a View of the several Products of the Ports or Nations we trade to. By J. S. Edinburgh. 1705
- Reasons against Imposing Prisedg Wines in Scotland
- The Age of the World
- …the Case of John Sproul…

== Bibliography ==
Robert Wodrow had papers on John Spreul.

== See also ==
Sanquhar Declaration
