= Richard Cameron (Covenanter) =

Scottish preacher, c. 1648–1680

- Cameron depicted in a Covenanter history published in 1901
- Born: 1648; Falkland, Fife
- Died: 22 July 1680 (aged 31–32); Airds Moss, Clydeside
- Education: St Salvator's College, St Andrews
- Occupation: religious leader
- Known for: Covenanters

Richard Cameron (1648? – 22 July 1680) was a leader of the militant Presbyterians, known as Covenanters, who resisted attempts by the Stuart monarchs to control the affairs of the Church of Scotland, acting through bishops. While attempting to revive the flagging fortunes of the Covenanting cause in 1680, he was tracked down by the authorities and killed in a clash of arms at Airds Moss in Ayrshire. His followers took his name as the Cameronians and ultimately formed the nucleus of the later Scottish regiment of the same name, the Cameronians. The regiment was disbanded in 1968.

== Life ==
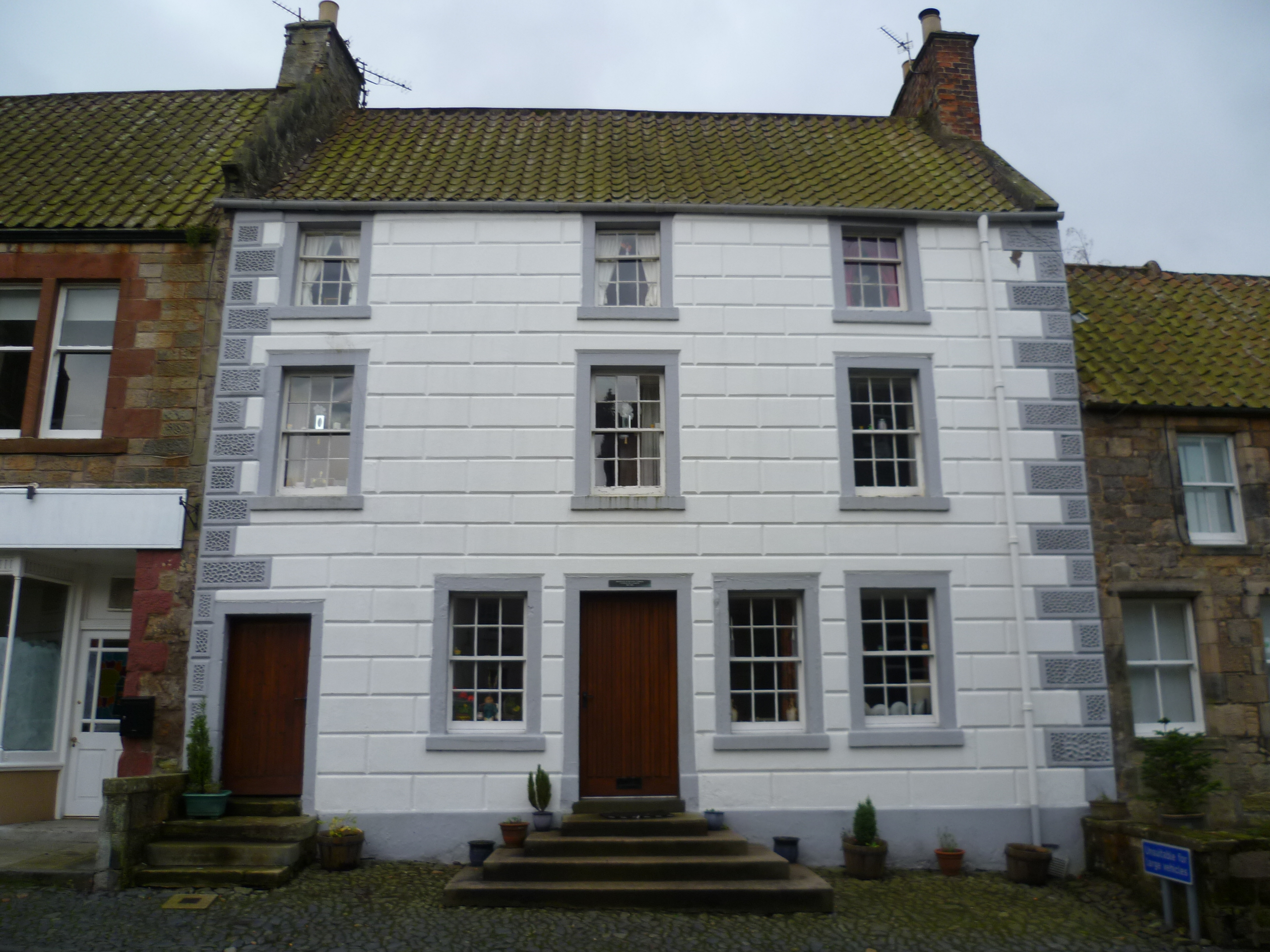
Cameron's birthplace in Falkland

Cameron was born at Falkland, Fife in 1647, or 1648, the son of Allan and Margaret Cameron who farmed the estate of Fordell, near Leuchars. St Salvator's College of St Andrews University has a record of his enrolment in the Arts faculty there on 5 March 1662. After graduation he returned to Falkland where he found employment as the parish school teacher and precentor in late 1669 or early 1670. It was some time after this that he began to attend conventicles. On 16 April 1675 he, his brother Michael and his parents were summoned to appear at the local court, charged with "keeping conventicles at the house of John Geddie in Falkland" and "withdrawing from the parish church". The outcome of the case is not known, but it is likely that the accused were fined; and it is known that the entire family moved shortly thereafter to Edinburgh where Michael had married into the family of a burgess. Here Cameron came under the spiritual guidance of an itinerant field-preacher, John Welwood. After a brief period employed as private chaplain to the wife of Sir William Scott of Harden in 1675, Cameron was dismissed from service for refusing to attend the parish church on the Sabbath. With Welwood's encouragement Cameron became increasingly religiously active and was eventually licensed as a field preacher in 1678.

Robert MacWard who, with John Brown, ordained Cameron in Holland

Between 1669 and 1672, two Indulgences were granted in the name of Charles II, intended to bring over 270 dissenters, a third of the ministry, back into the fold of the Church of Scotland. While over 40 outed ministers agreed to the new terms, submitting themselves to the Crown's High Church Anglican form of church governance—which meant accepting episcopacy and the King as head of the church—Cameron remained with those who rejected any accommodation that would compromise their presbyterian principles. He was accused by moderates of fomenting division in the Kirk by declaring his opposition to the Indulgences in his public preaching and formally summoned to appear three times before presbyteries, the moderator urging him to be "circumspect and inoffensive". In early 1679, amid mounting pressure from indulged ministers, Cameron embarked for the Netherlands to join other exiles.

The year 1679 was one of continuing confrontation between the Covenanters and the authorities, culminating in the assassination of Archbishop Sharp, the so-called Rutherglen Declaration and the battles of Drumclog and Bothwell Bridge. In late July or early August, Cameron was ordained a Church of Scotland minister at the Scots Kirk in Rotterdam. The Rev. Robert MacWard, who conducted the ceremony, reportedly said prophetically to the onlookers,

"Richard, the publick standard of the Gospel is fallen in Scotland; and, if I know anything of the mind of the Lord, ye are called to undergo your trials before us, and go home and lift the fallen standard, and display it before the world. But, before you put your hand to it, ye shall go to as many of the field ministers as ye can find, and give them your hearty invitation to go with you; and if they will not go, go your lone, and the Lord will go with you. Behold, all ye beholders! Here is the head of a faithful minister and servant of Jesus Christ, who shall lose the same for his Master's interest; and it shall be set up before sun and moon in the public view of the world."

Several weeks later Cameron returned to Scotland, where in the meantime a Third Indulgence had been granted and accepted by a vote in the General Assembly. Hoping to revive the cause of the demoralised Covenanters after their recent defeats, he resumed his field-preaching after reporting in code to McWard, "I was received with more affection and joy than ever before." On 8 December he wrote again in code to Rotterdam,

"I have got a far better market than was expected when I came from you; our wares vend well, both in open markets and in houses through the country."

Joined by Donald Cargill, another exile from Rotterdam, Cameron helped draw up a band (bond of mutual defence) in March 1680, which eventually carried 27 signatures of the group who formed the nucleus of his loyal following. By April the Scottish Privy Council reported to James, Duke of York, who feared Covenanter meetings as "fore-runners of rebellion", that new measures were being planned against the "fanatics" who were "running out again to field-conventicles in several parts of the kingdom".

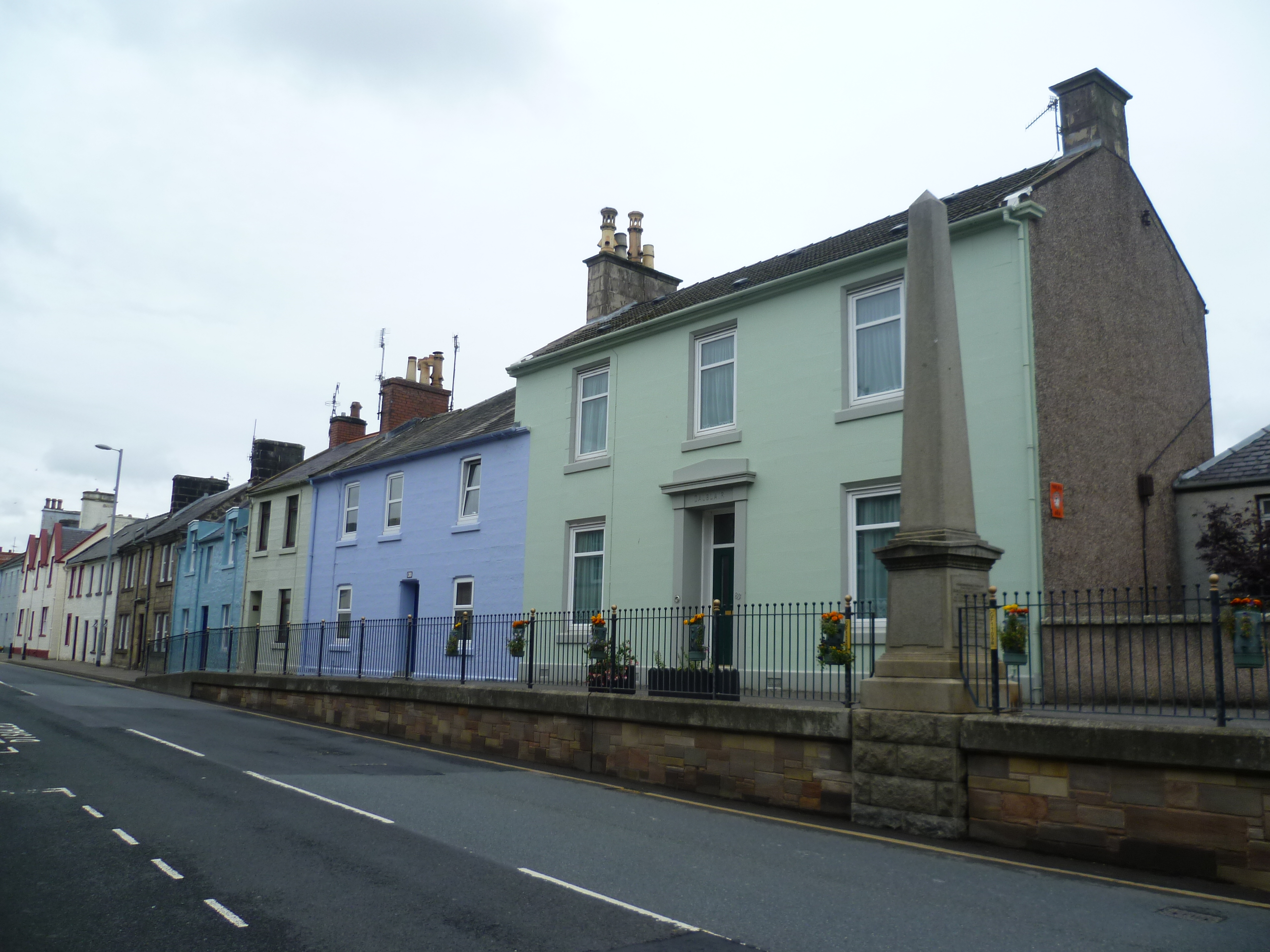
The Sanquhar Declarations Monument, Sanquar High Street

On 22 June 1680 Cameron, accompanied by 20 followers, including David Hackston, wanted for his part in the murder of Archbishop Sharp, rode into the town of Sanquhar in Nithsdale. After singing a psalm at the cross, Michael Cameron read aloud the Sanquhar Declaration, calling for war against Charles II, denounced as a "tyrant", and the exclusion of his openly Roman Catholic brother James from the succession. The Privy Council's response on 30 June condemned the "execrable paper" as tantamount to a declaration of war and declared the participants "open and notorious traitors and rebels". Cameron had a price of 5,000 merks placed on his head, while 3,000 merks were offered for three other identified ring-leaders of the group, including Cargill (who, because of personal reservations, had not in fact been present at Sanquar) and 1,000 merks for each for the others.

In the weeks that followed Cameron continued preaching before ever-growing crowds at various locations in the south west of Scotland. He delivered what was to be his last sermon at Kype Water, Clydesdale (modern Lanarkshire) on Sunday 18 July 1680, where he told the assembled congregation,

"But we are of the opinion that the church shall yet be more high and glorious, and the church shall have more power than ever she had before; and therefore we declare avowedly in opposition to all tyrannical magistrates over Protestants and over Presbyterians, magistrates that are open enemies to God. We declare we will have none such acknowledged as lawful magistrates over us; we will have none but such as are for the advancement of piety, and the suppression of impiety and wickedness. Let all the world say as they will, we have the Word of God for it. The work begun shall be carried on in spite of all opposition; our Lord shall be exalted on earth; and we do not question much but that he shall yet be exalted in Scotland. I assure you that we in Scotland have need to take heed to ourselves. I am very much afraid that we may even have done with good days in Scotland for all this. But let us stir up ourselves, and take hold of him by faith; for I assure you, if ye be not delivered, and made a free and purified people, we shall be no more a free corporation, nation, or embodied people, than the Jews are this day. I say not this to disquiet you, but to stir you up to take hold of Christ, and his standard on which it shall be written, 'Let Christ Reign'. Let us study to have it set up amongst us. It is hard to tell, where it shall be first erected; but our Lord is to set up a standard, and oh that it may be carried to Scotland! When it is set up, it shall be carried through the nations; and it shall go to Rome, and the gates of Rome shall be burnt with fire. It is a standard that shall overthrow the throne of Britain, and all the thrones in Europe, that will not kiss the Son lest he be angry, and in his anger they perish from the way."

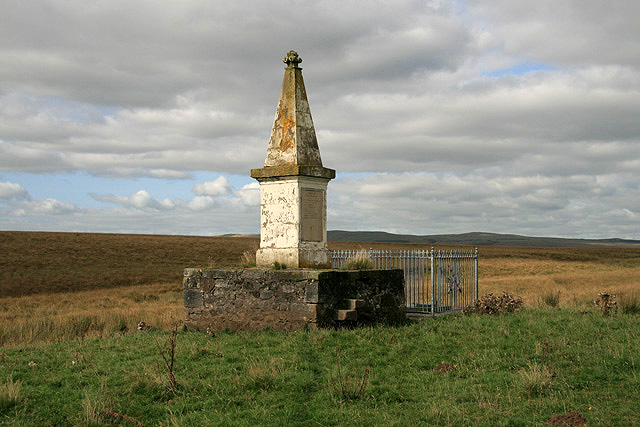
The Covenanters Monument at Airds Moss

On 22 July, accompanied by about 60 followers on horse and foot, Cameron was in east Ayrshire when government dragoons commanded by Andrew Bruce of Earlshall ('Bluidy Bruce'), acting on information received from a local laird, tracked him down at Airds Moss near Cumnock. During a bloody engagement at about four o'clock in the afternoon Cameron's followers, who had become known as the 'Hill Men', were overwhelmed by superior numbers. Bruce's despatch reported, "The dispute continued a quarter of an hour very hot; the rebels, refusing either to fly or take quarter, fought like madmen ..." Cameron was killed on the spot and Hackston taken prisoner. Cameron's head and hands were severed from his body and taken to Edinburgh where they were shown to his father who was already imprisoned in the town's tolbooth.

When his father was shown the head and hands of his son, he was asked "Do you know them?" Alan Cameron kissed his son's head and said, "I know them. I know them. They are my son's, my own dear son's. It is the Lord. Good is the will of the Lord, who cannot wrong me or mine, but has made goodness and mercy to follow us all our days."

After being paraded through the main street behind Cameron's head displayed aloft on the end of a pole, Hackston was sentenced and two days later brutally executed at the cross. Cameron's head and hands were then affixed to the Netherbow Port for public display.

The period in which these events took place was later given the name "The Killing Time" because hundreds, if not thousands of Presbyterians were persecuted and martyred for holding Cameronian views.

== Legacy ==
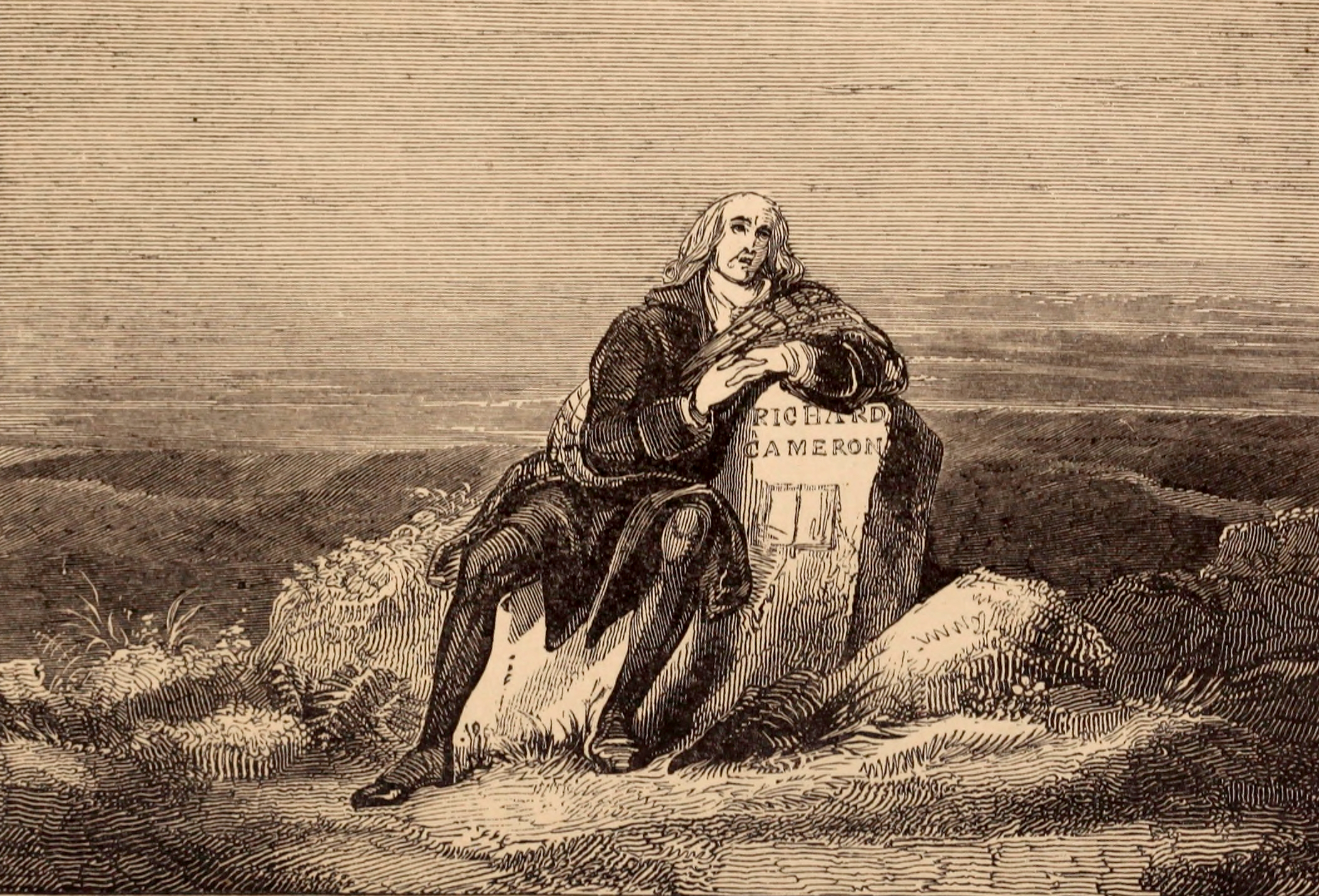
Peden at Richard Cameron's grave. Alexander Peden is reported to have said "Oh to be wi thee, Ritchie!" at the grave of Cameron's decapitated body. Several poems have been written about Cameron.

In 1689, following the accession of William II and that monarch's adoption of religious toleration (excepting Roman Catholics in positions of state), Cameron's followers were pardoned and incorporated into the British Army as the Cameronian regiment which defeated Jacobite forces later that year in the Battle of Dunkeld. The troop was subsequently renamed the 26th (Cameronian) Regiment of Foot and continued to serve the British Crown until its disbandment in 1968 as part of a post-imperial reduction in the size of Britain's armed forces.

Viewed by royalists, episcopalians and moderate presbyterians as narrow-minded zealots, the Cameronians saw themselves as emulating the early Christian martyrs by holding steadfastly to their beliefs in the face of their enemies' cruelties and contraptions of torture and execution. The 'blood sacrifice' they made for the sake of their Protestant consciences exerted a strong influence on later generations of Protestant Scots and still resonates with many of their countrymen to this day. Cameron's most recent biographer follows a tradition in seeing their struggle as one of religious and civil liberty in the face of an hereditary monarchy and therefore an early expression of republicanism.

A flavour of the religious fervour inspired by the Cameronians can be gauged from the symbolism and language of a poem, The Cameronian's Dream, which preserved their memory long after the events described above had taken place. Its author James Hyslop was a self-taught shepherd from the Cumnock-Sanquhar area in the south west of Scotland which was the seedbed of the two Covenanter Risings of 1666 and 1679. Written by Hyslop between the ages of fourteen and eighteen and published in 1821, the poem ends with a Cameronian's vision on the desolate moor at Airds Moss.

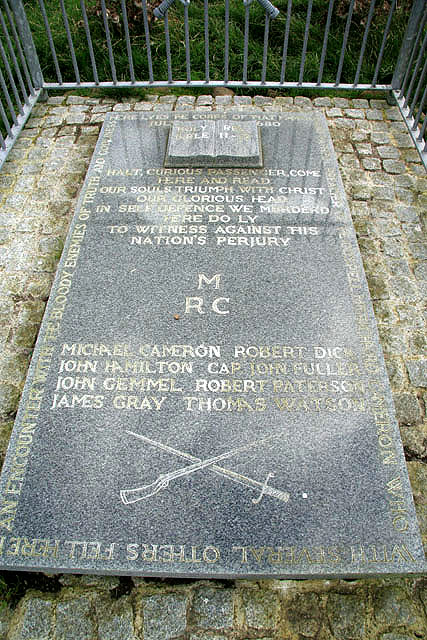
Grave at Airds Moss bearing the inscription MRC for the 'Martyr' Richard Cameron who lies with eight of his followers including his brother

When the righteous had fallen, and the combat had ended,
A chariot of fire through the dark cloud descended;
Its drivers were angels, on horses of whiteness,
And its burning wheels turned upon axles of brightness;

A seraph unfolded its doors bright and shining,
All dazzling like gold of the seventh refining,
And the souls that came forth out of great tribulation,
Have mounted the chariots and steeds of salvation.

On the arch of the rainbow the chariot is gliding,
Through the paths of the thunder the horsemen are riding.
Glide swiftly, bright spirits, the prize is before ye
A crown never-fading, – a kingdom of glory!

== See also ==
- Cameronian
- The Cameronians (Scottish Rifles)
