= Robert MacWard =

Scottish minister in Rotterdam, 1633–1687

- MacWard from a painting in the Scots Kirk, Rotterdam

Personal details
- Born: Robert MacWard also spelled M'Ward, M'Cuard, MacUard or M'Vaird; 1633 Glenluce
- Died: 1681 Gardners gives "May or June" Rotterdam
- Denomination: Presbyterian
- Education: University of St Andrews

Robert MacWard (various spellings) was a Scottish preacher in the seventeenth century. A supporter of the Scottish Reformation, he refused to follow the episcopal church of the king of England, and preached as a Covenanter.

MacWard appears to have studied at the University of St. Andrews, where he was for some time regent of humanity. In 1654 he was appointed one of the regents of Glasgow University without competition on 4 August 1653, but resigned the appointment from ill-health, and on 8 September was ordained to the collegiate charge of the Outer High Church, Glasgow, the usual ordination trials being dispensed with. From 1656 to 1659 he had charge of the south district of the parish, in 1660 of the west, and in 1661 of the east. In 1659 he was named for the vice-chancellorship of the university, but the proposal, which was opposed by Robert Baillie, who seems always to have borne him a grudge, was unsuccessful.

After the Restoration Macward in February 1661 preached a sermon in which he was reported to have said: 'I humbly offer my dissent to all acts which are or shall be passed against the covenants and work of Reformation in Scotland; and secondly, protest that I am desirous to be free of the guilt thereof, and pray that God may put it upon record in heaven'. On this account he was brought under a guard to Edinburgh, and imprisoned in the Tolbooth; and having been indicted by the king's advocate for treasonable teaching, he was on 6 June called before the parliament, where he made a speech in his defence. It was agreed to delay final disposal of his case; but ultimately sentence of banishment was passed against him, with permission to remain for six months in Scotland, but only one of these months in Glasgow, power also being granted to him to receive the following year's stipend on his departure. He went to Holland, where on 23 June 1676 he was admitted minister of the second charge of Rotterdam; but at the instance of Charles II he was removed by order of the States-General, 27 February 1677. For a time he retired to Utrecht, but in 1678 he returned to Rotterdam, where he died in December 1687. He married the widow of John Graham, merchant in Holland, and formerly provost of Glasgow, but left no issue.

== Life ==
Map of Rotterdam by Frederick de Wit (1690). John Blackadder was the grand nephew of Timothy Pont.

Robert MacWard was formerly the collegiate minister of the Outer High or East (St Paul's) Church, Glasgow. He was a native of Glenluce, Galloway. As a student he was a favourite of Samuel Rutherford, whom he accompanied to London as amanuensis during Rutherford's visit as one of the Scottish Commissioners to the Westminster Assembly. Robert MacWard graduated with an M.A. and became a regent in the University of Glasgow in 1653, having been licensed shortly before. He was called on 5 June, and ordained on 4 September 1656, with charge of Glasgow South Quarter, 1656-9, West in 1660, and East in 1661. He was indicted before Parliament, 5 and 12 July 1661, for sedition and treasonable preaching, and was condemned to be banished. He went to Holland, assisted his ministerial brethren there, and was admitted second minister of the Scots Church, Rotterdam, 23 January 1676, but was obliged to remove by order of the States General, on 27 February 1677. He retired to Utrecht for a time, but returned to Rotterdam in 1678, where he died Dec. 1681, aged about 54. He was a man of elevated piety and great firmness of mind, which enabled him to bear his trials with fortitude and even cheerfulness. He adopted the side of the Protesters, and after leaving Scotland was zealous against the Indulgence and those who complied with it, though latterly he modified his opinions, thinking he had carried them too far. It was MacWard who, along with John Brown, ordained Richard Cameron in Holland.

== Works ==
Macward was the author of:

- 'The True Nonconformity,' 1671.
- 'The English Ballance, weighing the Reasons of England's present Conjunction with France against the Dutch,' 1672.
- 'The Poor Man's Cup of Cold Water ministered to the Saints and Sufferers for Christ in Scotland, who are amid the Scorching Flames of the Fiery Tryal,' printed in 1678, and reprinted 1709.
- 'Έπαγωνισμοι: or Earnest Contendings for the Faith, being the Answers written to Mr. Robert Fleming's First and Second Papers of Proposals for Union with the Indulged;
- the First Paper written anno 1681; whereunto some of the Author's Letters relative to the Lives and Duties of the Day are annexed,' 1728.
- 'The Banders Disbanded,' 1681.
- 'A Collection of Tracts' by him appeared at Dairy in 1805. He added notes to John Livingstone's 'Letters to his Parishioners at Ancrum,' 1671; and is the supposed author of 'A Large Preface and Postscript' to Samuel Rutherford's 'Joshua Redivivus.'
- Earnest Contendings for the Faith (1723)
- A Collection of Tracts (Dairy, 1805) besides works in Dutch and Prefaces to works by Principal Rutherfurd, Brown of Wamphray, Binning of Govan, and Durham of Glasgow.
- Speech and Supplication to Parliament (Wodrow's Hist., i., 207-14)
- Seventy Letters (Wodrow MSS. in Advocates Library, Edinburgh).

== Bibliography ==
- De Wekker der Leeraaren in tyden van Verval ["Solemn Appeal to Preachers in the Times of Spiritual Declension "] (3rd ed., Rotterdam, 1733). [No copy is known in English.] He was the first to give to the world the Religious Letters of Samuel Rutherford (Rotterdam, 1664).
- Murray's Literary Hist, of Galloway, 107;
- Murray's Life of Samuel Rutherford, 233, 334;
- Steven's Rotterdam, 350–5.
- Wodrow's Hist., i. 306, 344, iii. 204, iv. 498-501;
- Wodrow's Anal., i. 170, iii. 55;
- Binning's (Life) Sermon;
- Kirkton's Hist.
- Lockerby's Life of Brown

== Family ==
He married Marion Cullen, the widow of John Graham, merchant in Holland, sometime Provost of Glasgow and raised her son John as his stepson. She survived him, without issue.

== See also ==
- Donald Cargill
- John Spreul
- John Brown of Wamphray
