= Battle of Rullion Green =

1666 battle of the Scottish Covenanter Wars

Coordinates: 55.85005°N 3.25505°W

- Part of the Scottish Covenanter Wars
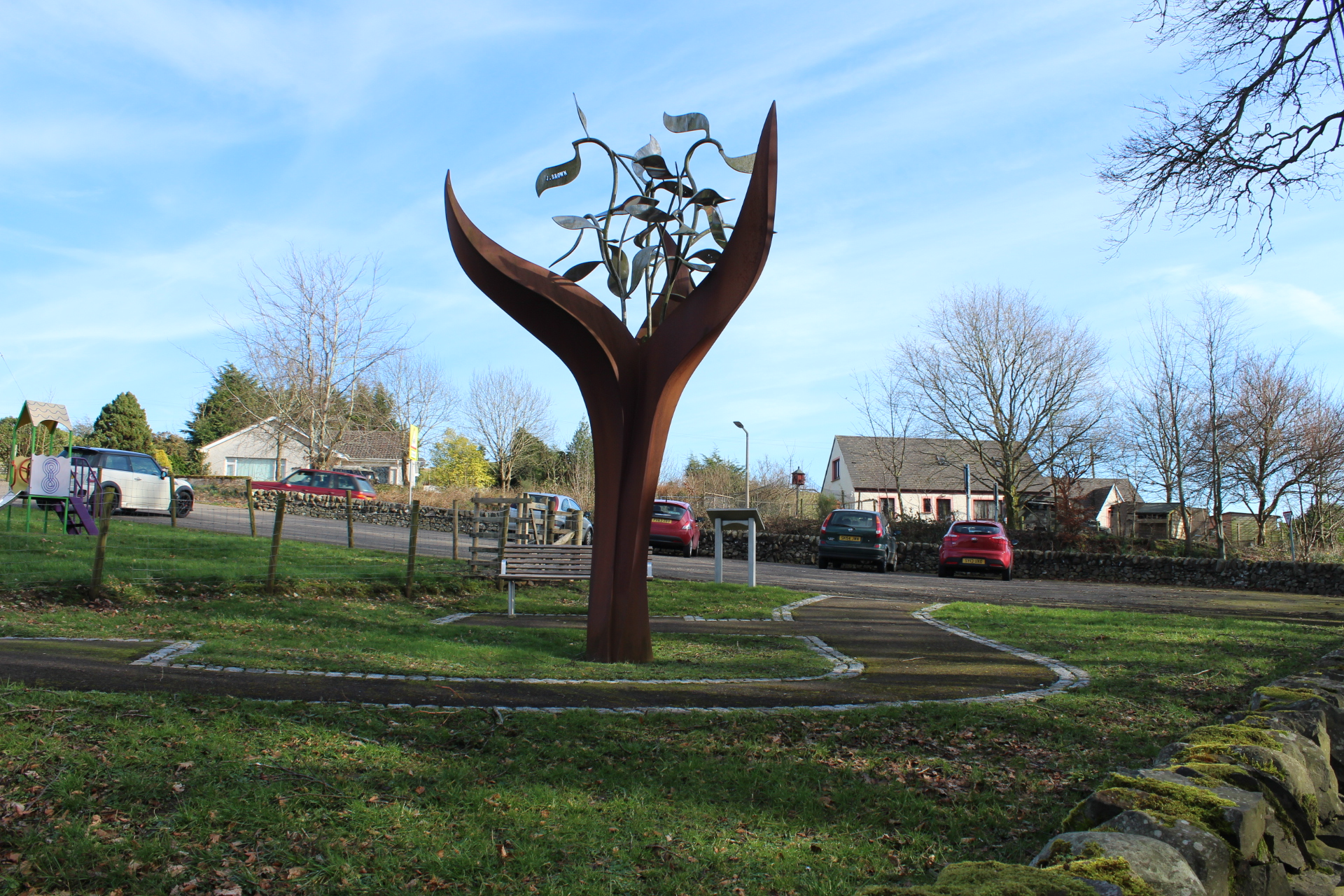
- The Dalry Covenanter Sculpture which commemorates the uprising
| Date | 28 November 1666 |
| Location | Pentland Hills, Lothian, Scotland |
| Result | Royalist victory |

Belligerents
| Scottish Royal Army | Covenanter insurgents |

Commanders and leaders
| Tam Dalyell of the Binns; William Drummond | James Wallace of Auchens; Joseph Learmont |

Strength
| 2,000 – 3,000 | 750 – 1,100 |

Casualties and losses
| Light | 40 to 50 killed; 36 later executed |

Registered battlefield
- Designated: 30 November 2011
- Reference no.: BTL27

The Battle of Rullion Green took place on 28 November 1666, near the Pentland Hills, in Midlothian, Scotland. It was the only significant battle of the Pentland Rising, a brief revolt by Covenanter dissidents against the Scottish government.

Sparked by opposition to the restoration of episcopalianism in the Church of Scotland, a Covenanter army under Colonel James Wallace was defeated by a government force led by Tam Dalyell of the Binns.

While casualties were relatively light, between 40 and 50 Covenanters were killed and up to 85 prisoners taken, many of whom were alleged to have been tortured. 36 were executed and others transported to Barbados, while unrest continued over the next two decades, culminating in the extended period of repression from 1679 to 1688 known as The Killing Time.

== Background ==
After the restoration of the monarchy in 1660, the Rescissory Act 1661 restored bishops to the Church of Scotland, or kirk. Ministers were required to renounce the 1638 National Covenant; about a third, or around 270 in total, refused to do so and lost their positions as a result. Many were based in the south-west of Scotland, an area particularly strong in its Covenanting sympathies; they held informal services in open fields known as Conventicles, which often attracted thousands of worshippers.

The Covenanter role in the disputes that led to the 1638 to 1651 Wars of the Three Kingdoms meant they were seen as a threat not only to the 1661 kirk settlement but the stability of the regime as a whole. In dealing with them, the government alternated between persecution and toleration; in 1663, dissenting ministers were declared 'seditious persons', with heavy fines for those who failed to attend the parish churches of the "King's curates". Close cultural, commercial and religious links between Scotland and the Dutch Republic meant these concerns heightened following the outbreak of the Second Anglo-Dutch War in 1665, while the war severely damaged the Scottish economy.

Pentlands Campaign November 1666

Troops under General James Turner were sent into the southwest to enforce these sanctions and the so-called Pentland Rising began on 12 November 1666 in St. John's Town of Dalry. This has traditionally been portrayed as a spontaneous action, allegedly triggered when local Covenanters came across soldiers threatening an elderly man for non-payment of a fine. Led by Robert McClellan of Barscobe Castle, they disarmed them, which was followed by a similar action in the nearly village of Balmaclellan.

Realising this would lead to reprisals, McClellan assembled what men he could and moved onto Dumfries, where they captured Turner. However, there is also evidence plans for co-ordinated action had been under discussion for several months; John Blackadder records meetings held by dissenting clergy in Edinburgh during the summer, including attendees from Nithsdale and Galloway. On learning of the rising, members of this group were sent to provide leadership and rally support, among them James Wallace of Auchens, an experienced soldier who served in Ulster and Scotland during the civil wars.

Many were wary of participation, while concerns over a Dutch-inspired revolt meant the government had already arrested prominent dissidents such as James Steuart of Coltness, former Provost of Edinburgh. However, the number of rebels quickly grew to around 700, sparked by a mixture of religious fervour and economic hardship, the majority of whom were unemployed artisans or workers. The leadership consisted of radical ministers like William Veitch and John Welsh, along with disgruntled minor gentry like McClellan and John Neilson of Corsock. On 21 November, they were joined by Wallace who assumed command, with Joseph Learmont as his deputy.

The original goal was Glasgow, a city generally sympathetic to their cause, but the road was blocked by a government army under Tam Dalyell of the Binns. Instead, they marched on Edinburgh, ostensibly to present a petition to the Privy Council of Scotland and hoping for reinforcements. By the time they reached Lanark on 26 November, their numbers had increased to 1,100; here they stopped to publicly subscribe to the Covenant, before moving onto Colinton the next day, just outside the city. However, they were unable to enter Edinburgh, while many of their men were exhausted by two weeks of marching around Scotland in the winter. With their route to the west blocked by Dalyell, Wallace moved east and then south along the line of the Pentland Hills, halting near Rullion Green to wait for stragglers. Here they were intercepted by a troop of cavalry led by Dalyell's deputy, William Drummond.

== The battle ==
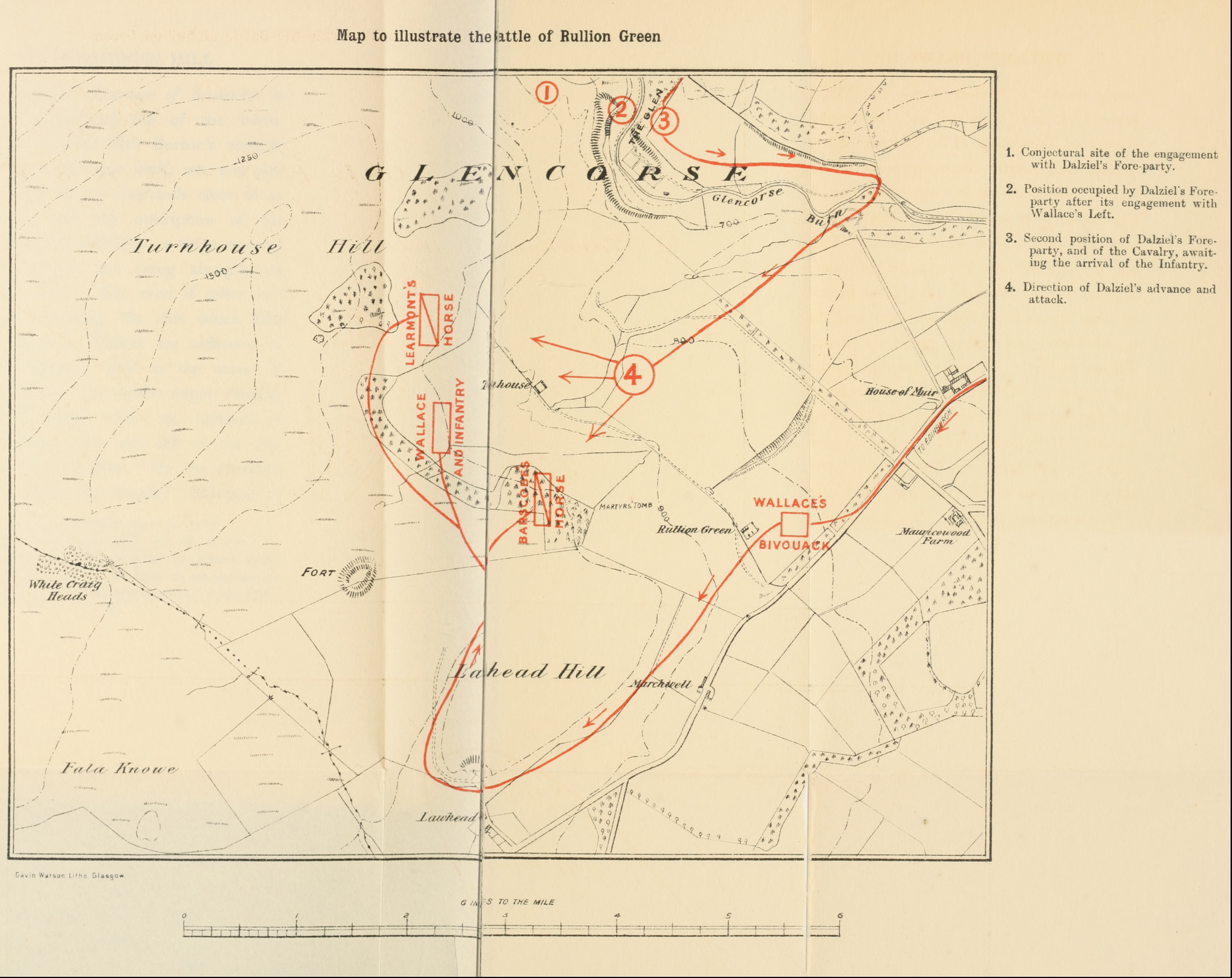
Rullion Green battle map

Drummond's cavalry were driven off, but the main force was only four miles away, too close for the Covenanters to escape. Wallace formed up his troops on the high ground above Glencorse River and waited while Dalyell deployed his men into battle formation. The Covenanter left was attacked on three separate occasions, each of which was repulsed, with a fourth attempt taking place in the late afternoon. At this point, a small body of Covenanter cavalry moved across the battlefield to relieve the pressure on their left, exposing their right.

Seeing this opportunity, Drummond now attacked; outnumbered and under pressure all along their front, the Covenanter position collapsed and they fled into the night, leaving around 50 dead, many killed in the pursuit that followed. The casualties included John Cruickshank and Andrew McCormack, two Presbyterian ministers from Ulster, while estimates of prisoners taken varies from 80 to 140. Most of the leaders escaped, including Wallace, who made his way to the Netherlands where he died in 1678, and Learmont, who was hidden by sympathisers in Ulster and returned to Scotland to fight at Bothwell Bridge in 1679. Veitch and Welsh also avoided arrest and remained prominent in the Covenanter movement.

== Aftermath ==
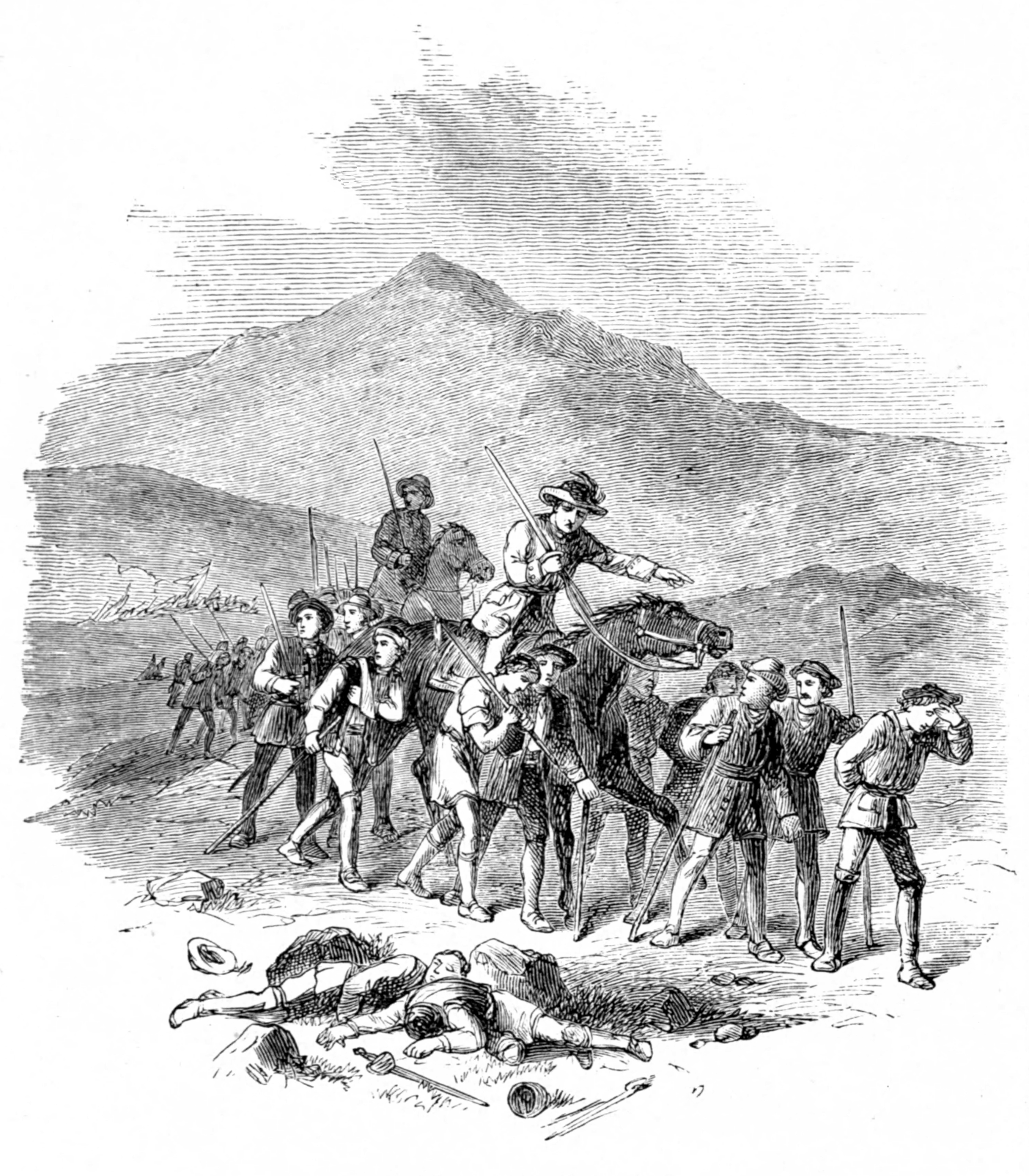
The Battle of Rullion Green

On 19 December 1666, nine Covenentors and participants in the Pentland Rising were beheaded in the square of Glasgow. A marker describes the event: "Here lies the corpse of Robert Bunton, John Hart, Robert Scot, Matthew Patoun, John Richmond, James Johnston, Archibald Stewart, Jams Winning, and John Main, who suffered at the Cross of Glasgow for their testimony of the covenants and work of the Reformation because they did not noun the Authority of the Tyrants destroying the same betwixt 1666 and 1668."

Years sixty-six and eighty-four
Did send these souls to Glory,
those bodied here interred lie,
They sacrificed to tyranny,
To covenant a reformation,
Cause they adhered in their station,
These nine and others in this yard
Whose heads and bodies were not sparred,
Their Testimonies, foes to bury,
Caused beat the drums there in great fury,
They'll know at resurrection day,
To murder Saints was no sweet play.

Wallace and other leaders of the revolt had previously been implicated in conspiracies in both Scotland and Ireland, including the plot to seize Dublin Castle in 1662. The presence of Cruickshank and McCormack hinted at the possibility of a conspiracy uniting Ulster and southwest Scotland, which if combined with Dutch military support would pose a serious threat.

This may account for the severity of the government response. The few leaders to be captured included John Neilson and Hugh Mackail, a young preacher recently returned from the Netherlands; both were tortured for information before being executed on 14 and 22 December respectively. In all, 36 prisoners were executed in Edinburgh, Glasgow and Ayr, the remainder transported to Barbados.

While the rising had little impact, the Lauderdale administration initially pursued a more moderate policy towards Presbyterian dissidents. This was soon superseded by a renewed persecution, which continued over the next two decades, culminating in the extended period of repression from 1679 to 1688 known as The Killing Time. Those executed took their place in a tradition of Covenanter martyrs, which became particularly prominent in the 19th century, when their graves were marked with memorials.

== Sources ==
- Erskine, Caroline (2009). "Participants in the Pentland rising". Oxford Dictionary of National Biography (online ed.). Oxford University Press. doi:10.1093/ref:odnb/98249. (Subscription, Wikipedia Library access or UK public library membership required.)
- Historic Scotland. "Battle of Rullion Green" (PDF).
- McIntyre, Neil (2016). Saints and subverters : the later Covenanters in Scotland c.1648-1682 (PhD). University of Strathclyde. Archived from the original on 28 July 2020.
- Mackie, JD; Lenman, Bruce; Parker, Geoffrey (1986). A History of Scotland. Hippocrene Books. ISBN 978-0880290401.
- Mathieson, William Law (1902). Politics and religion; a study in Scottish history from the reformation to the revolution, Volume II. J. Maclehose.
- Mitchison, Rosalind; Fry, Peter; Fry, Fiona (2002). A History of Scotland. Routledge. ISBN 978-1138174146.
- Sidgwick, M (1906). "The Pentland Rising and the Battle of Rullion Green". The Scottish Historical Review. 3 (12): 449–452. JSTOR 25517766.
- Stronach, George; Furgol, Edward (2006). "Wallace, James (d.1678)". Oxford Dictionary of National Biography (online ed.). Oxford University Press. doi:10.1093/ref:odnb/28533. (Subscription, Wikipedia Library access or UK public library membership required.)
- Terry, Charles Sanford (1905). The Pentland Rising & Rullion Green. J. MacLehose.

== Bibliography ==
- Blackader, John (1826). Crichton, Andrew (ed.). Memoirs of Rev. John Blackader : compiled chiefly from unpublished manuscripts and memoirs of his life and ministry written by himself while prisoner on the Bass : and containing illustrations of the Episcopal persecution from the restoration to the death of Charles II : with an appendix giving a short account of the history and siege of the Bass & / by Andrew Crichton (2 ed.). Edinburgh: Printed for A. Constable & Company. pp. 107-132.
- Chambers, Robert (1870). "James Wallace". In Thomson, Thomas (ed.). A biographical dictionary of eminent Scotsmen. Vol. 3. Glasgow : Blackie. pp. 477–479.
- Cowan, I. B. The Scottish Covenanters, 1660-1688, 1976.
- Donaldson, G., Scotland from James V to James VII, 1965.
- "Dalry Covenanter Sculpture". Scottish Covenanter Memorials Association.
- Dunlop, Samuel (1912). "John Welsh, the Irongray Covenanter". Transactions and Journal of Proceedings 1911-1912. 2. 24. Dumfries: Dumfriesshire and Galloway Natural History and Antiquarian Society: 190–200.
- Dunlop, Samuel (1913). "John Welsh, the Irongray Covenanter". Transactions and Journal of Proceedings 1912-1913. 3. 1. Dumfries: Dumfriesshire and Galloway Natural History and Antiquarian Society: 65-86.
- Gibson, James (1875c). Inscriptions on the tombstones and monuments erected in memory of the Covenanters; with historical introduction and notes. Glasgow: Dunn. pp. 25-28.
- Henderson, Thomas Finlayson (1895). "Paton, James (d.1684)". In Lee, Sidney (ed.). Dictionary of National Biography. Vol. 44. London: Smith, Elder & Co.
- Henderson, Thomas Finlayson (1888). "Dalyell, Thomas". In Stephen, Leslie (ed.). Dictionary of National Biography. Vol. 13. London: Smith, Elder & Co.
- Hewison, James King (1913). "Chapter XXIII - The Ruling of Rothes and the Rising of Rullion Green". The Covenanters. Vol. 2. Glasgow: John Smith and son. pp. 169-220.
- Kirkton, James (1817). The secret and true history of the church of Scotland from the Restoration to the year 1678. J. Ballantyne.
- Lee, John (1860). Lectures on the history of the Church of Scotland : from the Reformation to the Revolution Settlement. Vol. 2. Edinburgh: William Blackwood.
- Mackay, Aeneas James George (1887). "Carstares, William". In Stephen, Leslie (ed.). Dictionary of National Biography. Vol. 9. London: Smith, Elder & Co.
- M'Crie, Thomas (1846). "Chapter III: From 1663 to 1666". Sketches of Scottish church history : embracing the period from the Reformation to the Revolution. Vol. 2. Edinburgh: J. Johnstone. pp. 101-123.
- Morton, Alexander S. (1914). Galloway and the Covenanters; or, The struggle for religious liberty in the south-west of Scotland. Paisley : A. Gardner. pp. 114-120.
- Morton, David (2013). Covenanters and Conventicles in South West Scotland (PDF) (MPhil(R)). University of Glasgow.
- Pollard, Albert Frederick (1899). "Turner, James". In Lee, Sidney (ed.). Dictionary of National Biography. Vol. 57. London: Smith, Elder & Co.
- Thomson, J. H. (1903). Hutchison, Matthew (ed.). The martyr graves of Scotland. Edinburgh: Oliphant, Anderson & Ferrier. pp. 1–18.
- Turner, James, Sir (1828). Memoirs of his own life and times, 1632–1670. Edinburgh: The Bannatyne Club.
- Wallace, James (1825). M'Crie, Thomas (ed.). Narrative of the Rising Suppressed at Pentland. Vol. Memoirs of Mr. William Veitch, and George Brysson. W. Blackwood; T. Cadell.
- Wodrow, Robert (1835). Burns, Robert (ed.). The history of the sufferings of the church of Scotland from the restoration to the revolution, with an original memoir of the author, extracts from his correspondence, and preliminary dissertation. Vol. 1. Glasgow: Blackie, Fullarton & co., and Edinburgh: A. Fullarton & co. pp. 304.

== Fiction ==
- Galt, John. Ringan Gilhaize, 1823
