= Robert Hamilton of Preston =

Scottish Presbyterian leader (1650–1701)

Sir Robert Hamilton of Preston Bt
- Born: 1650
- Died: October 20, 1701 (aged 50–51); Bo'ness, West Lothian
- Education: University of Glasgow
- Military career
- Conflicts: Battle of Drumclog; Battle of Bothwell Bridge

Sir Robert Hamilton, 2nd Baronet of Preston (1650–20 October 1701), was one of the leaders of the Scottish Covenanters. He was the son of Sir Thomas Hamilton, and brother of Sir William, 1st baronet of Preston. Hamilton was educated at Glasgow University under Professor Burnet. He attached himself to the cause of the Covenanters, and appears in command at Drumclog and Bothwell Brig. After the defeat he retired to Holland, where he remained with his brother-in-law, Gordon of Earlston, until the Revolution of 1688. He declined to recognise title of Prince of Orange, on the ground that he was not a Covenanted sovereign. He was arrested in Edinburgh for being concerned in the second Sanquhar Declaration of August, 1692, issued by the "United Societies". On liberation, he left his testimony afresh against backsliding in Church and State, and becomes as far as one person could be the main stay of "the afflicted Remnant." He died, unmarried, aged 51.

== Early life ==
He was the younger son of Sir Thomas Hamilton of Preston Tower, a Royalist, who fought as lieutenant-colonel at the battle of Dunbar in 1650, and at the battle of Worcester, in the cause of the Stuarts. After his death in 1672 a baronetcy was conferred in 1673 on his eldest son. Sir William. He then took part in the expedition of Archibald Campbell, 9th Earl of Argyll in 1685, escaped to Holland, accompanied the Prince of Orange to England in 1688, but died at Exeter, when the troops were on the march to London.

Robert Hamilton, the younger son, was educated at the University of Glasgow under the care of Gilbert Burnet, whose sister was his step-mother. He began to attend conventicles, and became an extreme Covenanter.

== Campaign of 1679 ==
Along with Thomas Douglas and Hackston of Rathillet he, in 1679, drew up what became known as the "Rutherglen declaration", which they intended on 29 May, the king's birthday, to nail to the market-cross of Glasgow. The advance of the troops of John Graham of Claverhouse prevented that, and Rutherglen, about two miles to the east of Glasgow, was chosen instead. They extinguished the bonfire in the king's honour and lit another, where they proceeded to burn all the acts of parliament and royal proclamations made since the Restoration. They then retired towards Evandale and Newmilns, preparing to hold an armed convention on the following Sunday at Loudoun Hill.

=== Battle of Drumclog ===
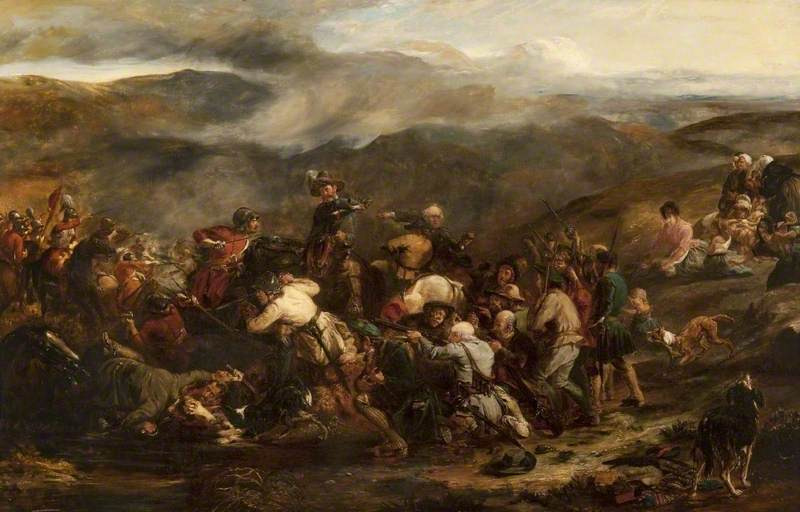
1836 painting of the Battle of Drumclog

Claverhouse, who had gone to Rutherglen, came suddenly in sight of the gathering. Sending away their women and children the covenanters drew up in battle array on the farm of Drumclog, a little to the east. Nominally Hamilton was in command, but the experienced officers, such as Hackston and Cleland, led the separate detachments of the Covenanters, defeating Claverhouse was due.

Hamilton, however, showed some energy after the fight. In a vindication of his conduct, 7 December 1685, published in Faithful Contendings displayed, for having put to death one of the prisoners after the battle with his own hand, he asserted that before the battle began he had given out the word that "no quarter should be given".

=== Battle of Bothwell Bridge ===
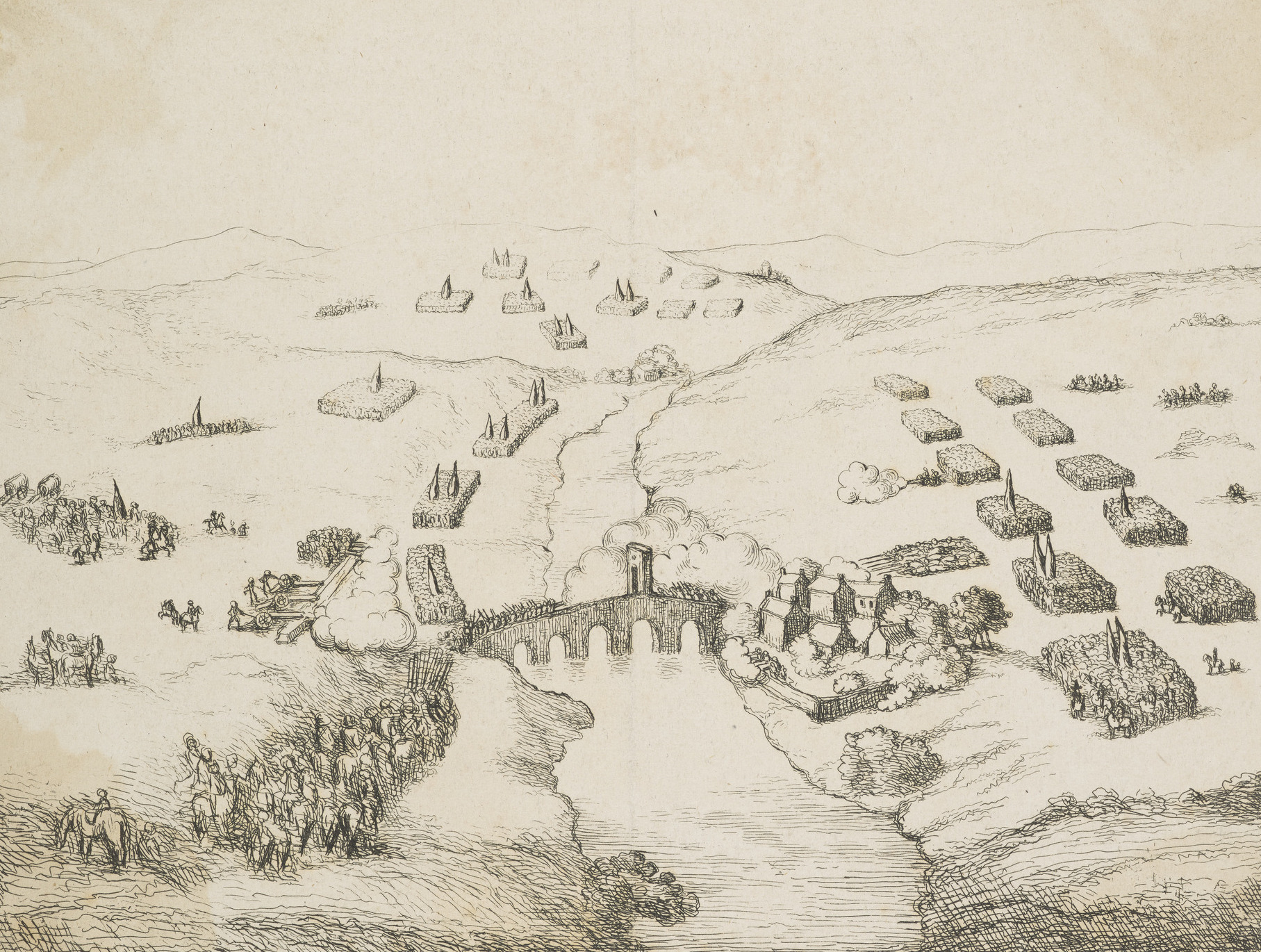
Illustration of the Battle of Bothwell Bridge

The troops had barricaded Glasgow, and the Covenanters were easily repulsed. They halted at the position occupied on the previous night, but on Claverhouse advancing towards them retreated to Hamilton. As Claverhouse was too weak to attack them here, they formed a camp, and according to Hamilton numbered within a week five or six thousand men. Hamilton took all the credit for the victory at Drumclog, and assumed command without ceremony. Time was spent in harangues and theological disputes.

After the withdrawal of the government forces to Stirling the Covenanters advanced to Glasgow, where they are stated to have robbed the archbishop's house, to have pulled down the ornaments of the cathedral, and to have defaced several of the monuments, but having done so they fell back on their old position. The arrival in the camp of John Welch, with a reinforcement of men from Ayr, introduced a disturbing element. Welch was prepared to accept a compromise with the government by which both episcopacy and presbyterianism should be tolerated. He was therefore denounced by the Hamilton party as an Erastian, and the dispute raged until the appearance of the government forces under the Duke of Monmouth. Welch and others, though much in the minority, drew up a declaration, which they presented on 22 June in the hope that it would lead to at least a suspension of hostilities. The declaration is known as the Hamilton declaration, in reference to the town where it was drawn up. Sir Robert Hamilton, in name of the army, also signed a petition to Monmouth, and afterwards, when taunted with this, said that he had been ensnared into the subscription by the belief that it was Donald Cargill's work.

When the Hamilton declaration was presented, the armies were drawn up facing each other on opposite banks of the River Clyde at Bothwell Bridge. Monmouth refused to consider terms until they had laid down their arms. Hamilton occupied himself with the erection of a gigantic gibbet, around which was placed a cartload of new ropes, but as soon as the action began his courage ebbed away. He ordered Hackston to retire when the bridge was attacked, and himself 'rode off with the horse' and 'allowed the foot to shift for themselves,' thus 'leaving the world to debate whether he acted most like a traitor, coward, or fool'.

Hamilton's courage was doubted. Burnet, in a passage omitted from the earlier editions of his Own Time,' calls him an 'ignominious coward,' and Robert Wodrow speaks of his behaviour at Bothwell Bridge as 'ill conduct, not to say cowardice.' During the attack on Glasgow he is said to have waited the issue in a place of safety. In any case he was incompetent as a commander, and displayed feebleness.

== Later life ==
Hamilton fled to Holland, whereupon he was outlawed, and sentenced to be executed whenever apprehended. While in Holland he acted as commissioner 'to the persecuted true presbyterian church in Scotland,' and in this capacity he visited Germany and Switzerland. In 1683 he prevailed on the presbytery of Groningen to ordain James Renwick, who had studied at the university there, as minister to the presbyterian church in Scotland.

At the Glorious Revolution in 1688 Hamilton returned to Scotland, and, his attainder having been reversed, succeeded in that year to the baronetcy on the death of his brother Sir William. He declined to claim his brother's estates, on the ground that it would involve the "acknowledging an uncovenanted sovereign of these covenanted nations". He was unmarried and privately took measures for securing the entailed settlement of the family inheritance on the issue of his brother's daughter Anne, by her husband Thomas, son of Sir James Oswald. On 20 October 1686 a letter had been sent to Hamilton by the united societies stating that they had information ready to be proven 'that he had countenanced the Hamilton declaration which he and his party since had cried out so much against; that he had signed a petition to Monmouth in name of the army; that he had received large sums of money from good people in Holland for printing the testimonies of the sufferers, and yet greater for the support of the suffering party in Scotland, of which he had given no accounts'. On his return to Scotland he continued, however, to retain his influence with the extreme Covenanters. On 9 November 1689 he protested against the 'compliance at Hamilton,' by which it was agreed by a section of the covenanters to form the Cameronian regiment, of which William Cleland was appointed colonel.

Suspected of having drawn up and published the Sanquhar declaration of 18 August 1692, Hamilton was arrested at Earlstown on 10 September, and for some months he was detained a prisoner at Edinburgh and Haddington. He was several times brought before the privy council for examination, but, although declining to acknowledge their jurisdiction or the authority of William and Mary, received his liberty on 15 May 1693, and was permitted to remain unmolested until his death, 20 October 1701.

== Bibliography ==
- The Believer's Farewell to the World, or an Elegie on the Death of that much honoured &c. Gentleman Sir Robert Hamilton, 1701;
- Faithful Contendings displayed;
- Howie's Scots Worthies;
- Wodrow's Sufferings of the Church of Scotland;
- Burnet's Own Time;
- Napier's Life of Viscount Dundee;
- Burton's Hist, of Scotland

Baronetage of Nova Scotia
Preceded by William Hamilton	Baronet (of Preston) c.1690–1701	Succeeded by Robert Hamilton
