= James Renwick (Covenanter) =

Scottish minister (1662–1688)

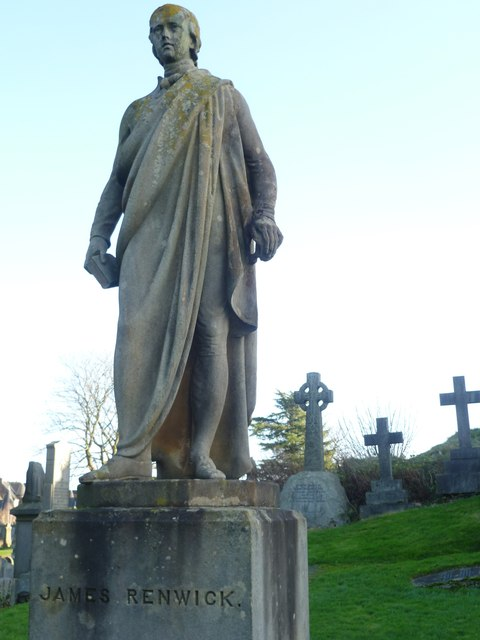
- Statue of James Renwick, Valley Cemetery, Stirling by Alexander Handyside Ritchie
- Born: James Renwick; 15 February 1662; Moniaive, Dumfriesshire, Scotland
- Died: 17 February 1688 (aged 26); Grassmarket, Edinburgh, Scotland
- Education: University of Edinburgh; University of Groningen
- Occupations: Minister, Covenanter, Martyr
- Theological work
- Tradition or movement: Presbyterian

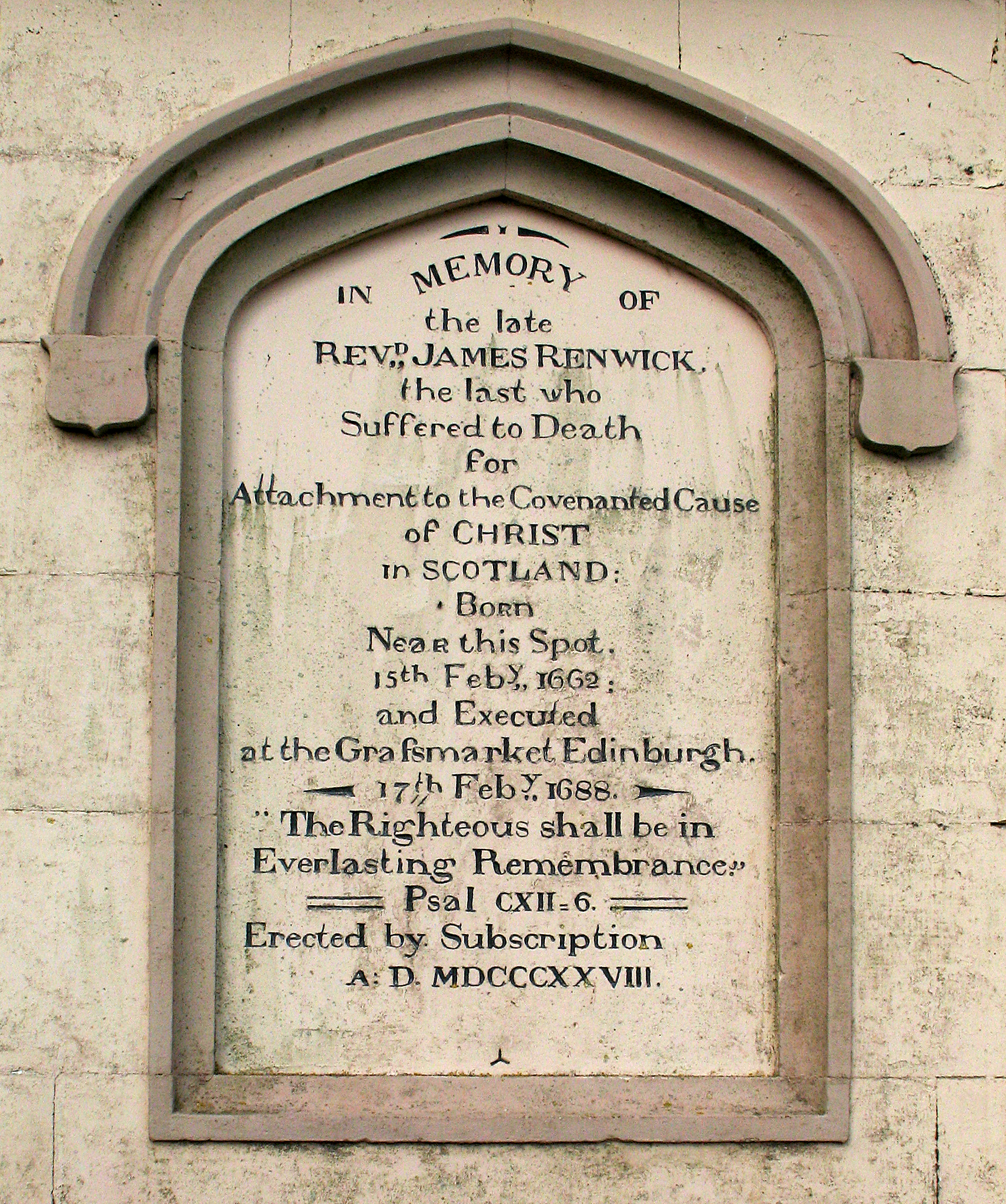
Inscription on the Renwick Monument, Moniaive

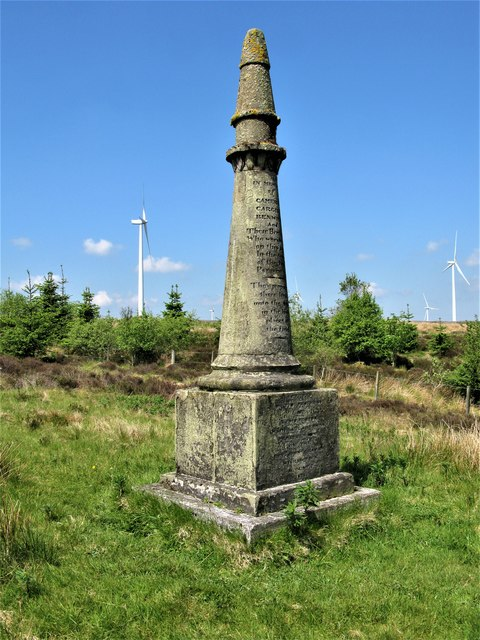
Darmead Memorial (Covenanters Monument), near Forth. Ministers who held conventicles here include Donald Cargill, Richard Cameron, Thomas Douglas and James Renwick.

James Renwick (15 February 1662 – 17 February 1688) was a Scottish minister who was the last of the Covenanter martyrs to be executed before the Glorious Revolution. A supporter of the Scottish Reformation, he refused to follow the episcopal church of the king of England, and preached as a Covenanter.

He was born at Moniaive in Dumfriesshire, the son of a weaver, Andrew Renwick. Educated at Edinburgh University, he joined the section of the Covenanters known as the Cameronians about 1681 and soon became prominent among them. Afterwards he studied theology at the university of Groningen and was ordained a minister in 1683. Returning to Scotland “full of zeal and breathing forth threats of organized assassination,” says Mr Andrew Lang, he became one of the field-preachers and was declared a rebel by the privy council. He was largely responsible for the “apologetical declaration” of 1684 by which he and his followers disowned the authority of Charles II. The privy council replied by ordering every one to abjure this declaration on pain of death. Unlike some of his associates, Renwick refused to join the rising under the earl of Argyll in 1685.

In 1687, when the declarations of indulgence allowed some liberty of Worship to the Presbyterians, he and his followers, often called Renwickites, continued to hold meetings in the fields, which were still illegal. A reward was offered for his capture, and early in 1688 he was seized in Edinburgh. Tried and found guilty of disowning the royal authority and other offences, he refused to apply for a pardon and was hanged.

== Life ==
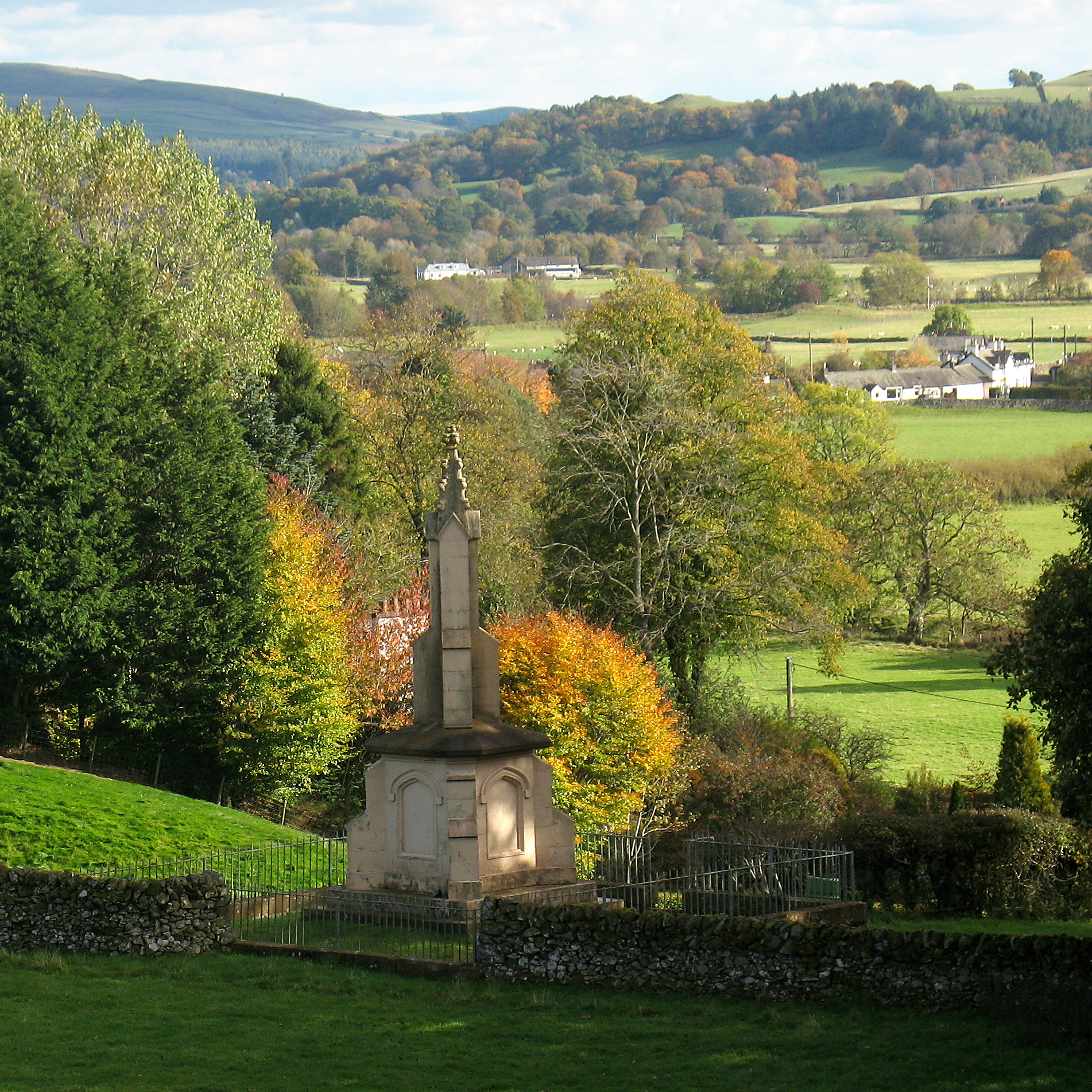
View of the Renwick Monument, Moniaive

=== Childhood ===
James Renwick was born at Moniaive in the Parish of Glencairn, Dumfriesshire, in 1662. Renwick's father Andrew (or in some sources, Alexander) was a weaver by trade. His mother, Elizabeth Corson, had borne several children prior to James' birth, but all had died in infancy or early childhood. The young James was credited with having an affinity for the church from a very early age. Alexander Shields (and later John Howie) wrote:

"By the time he was two years of age, he was observed to be aiming at prayer, even in the cradle and about it..."

=== In Edinburgh ===
In 1675, Andrew Renwick died and James went on to the University of Edinburgh, where he studied religion, in particular the presbyterian religion of his forefathers. In 1681, he saw several Covenanters executed in Edinburgh, including Donald Cargill (d. 27 July). Following this, Renwick resolved to cast in his lot with the adherents to the Sanquhar declaration, popularly known as Cameronians. In October 1681, he organised a secret meeting of members of this party, probably a field-conventicle, and by his earnest zeal did much to rally them to renewed action. A correspondence was instituted between the Societies of sympathisers in various parts of the west of Scotland. Renwick, at Lanark, on 12 January 1682, publicly proclaimed what was known as the Lanark declaration. He was not its author (it was written on 15 December 1681), and admitted that some of its vehement language against the existing authorities (‘a brothel, rather than a court’) was ill-advised. Sir Alexander Gordon of Earlston, who had been commissioned to Holland by the Societies in March 1682, made arrangements for Renwick to pursue his theological studies there, with a view to ordination.

=== Ordination in the Netherlands ===
After the martyrdom of Cargill the United Societies were without a minister, and there was no minister in Scotland whom they could acknowledge. But instead of ordaining at their own hands, they sent Renwick to Holland to get theological training from Dutch professors, and orderly instalment in the sacred office from Dutch presbyters; and from the middle of 1681 to the end of 1683, they had neither preaching nor sacraments. Shields mentions that Renwick, in the first year of his wonderful ministry, kept note of five hundred baptisms performed by him, and at that number "lost count."

In 1679, Renwick began his studies at the University of Groningen under Jacob Alting. His ordination was promoted by the interest of Sir Robert Hamilton with Brakel, a Dutch divine. Renwick objected to subscribe the Dutch formularies as inconsistent with the covenant, and was allowed to substitute a subscription to the Westminster confession and catechism. His ordination certificate is dated 9 April 1683; a day later a remonstrance reached Groningen from the Scottish ministers of Rotterdam. On 10 May he received commendatory letters from the Groningen classis, and proceeded to Briel, to embark for the return voyage. He abandoned the first ship, on which he had taken passage, on account of ‘profane passengers’ pressing him to drink the king's health, and transferred himself to a vessel bound for Ireland. After some adventures he reached Dublin, where he found the nonconformist ministers very indifferent to his cause. Proceeding by sea to Scotland, he at once entered on his ministry there.

=== Field preacher ===
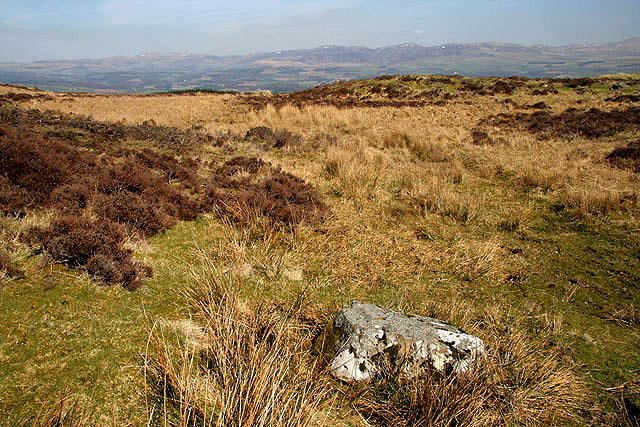
The Preaching Stone on Breconside Hill

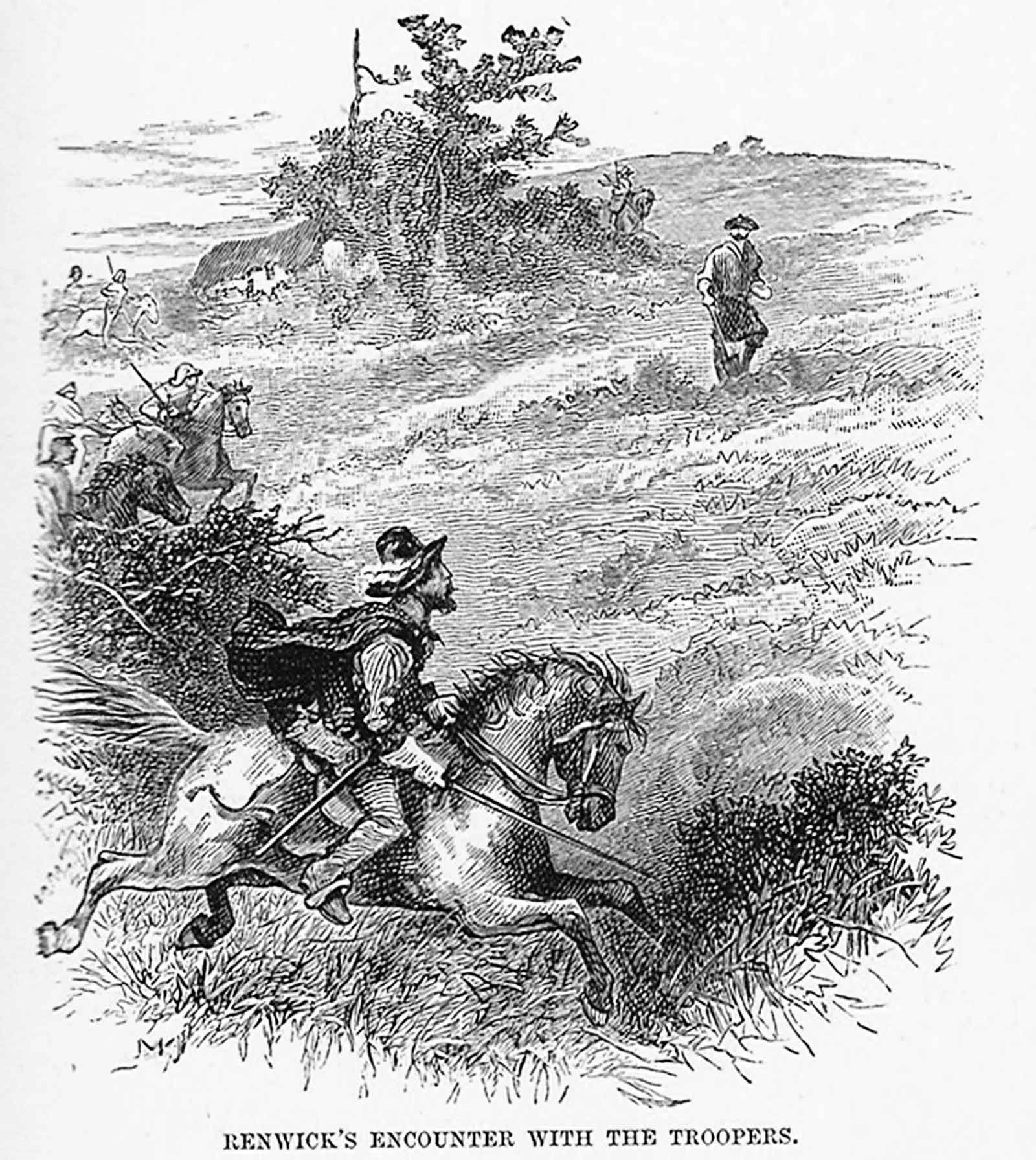
James Renwick's encounter with the troopers

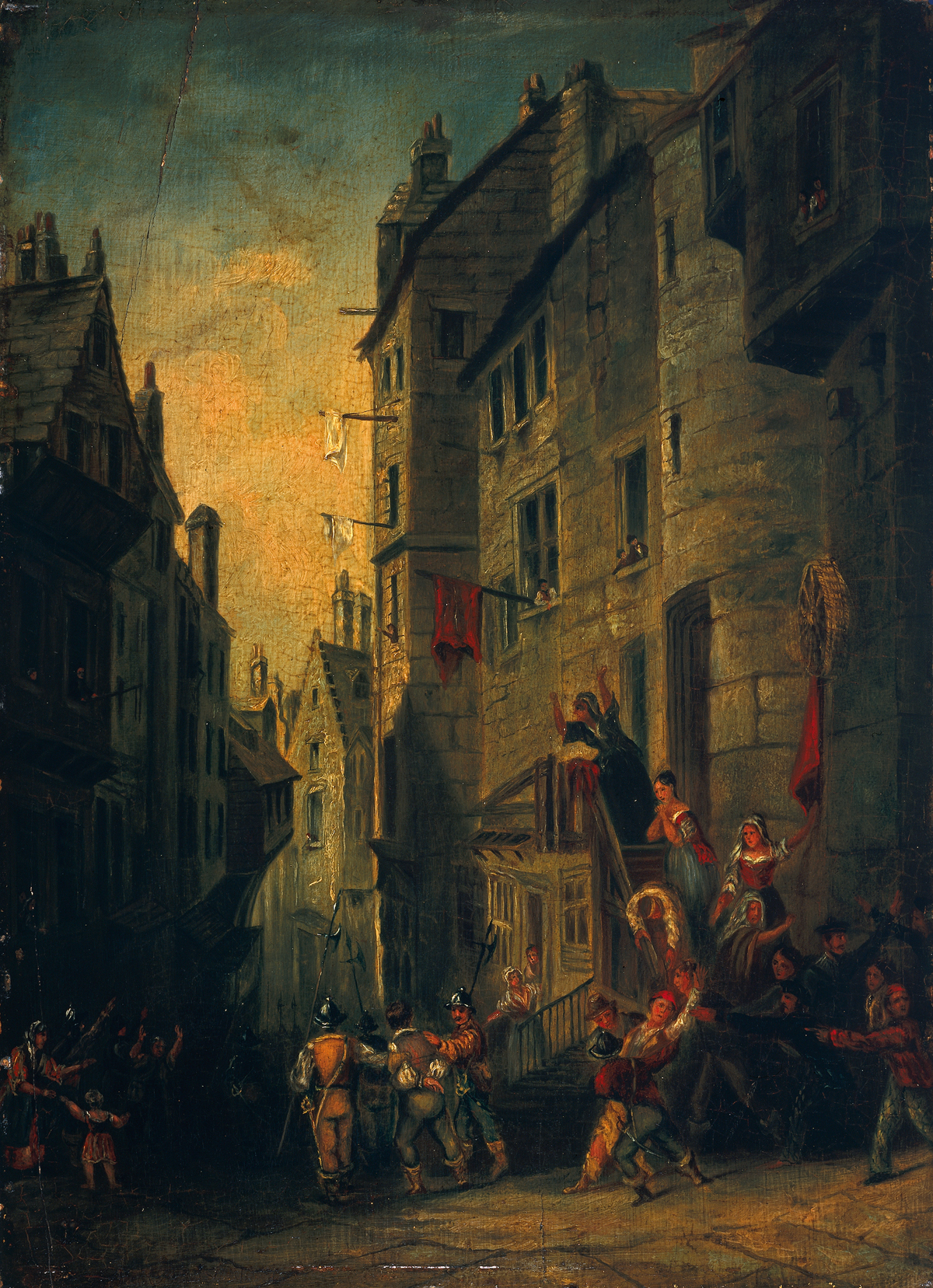
A painting showing Renwick being taken to execution in 1688

Upon his return to Scotland in 1683 he gave his first sermon at Darmead, Cambusnethan. He preached from the Book of Isaiah. Renwick spent the next five years travelling around Scotland ministering. He soon became noted as a field-preacher, and was proclaimed a rebel by the Scottish privy council. Though his fame spread, his position was variously misconstrued, some charging him with ‘the delirious and detestable blasphemies of Gib,’ the reference being to John Gib, shipmaster of Borrowstounness, Linlithgowshire, who, in April 1681, had started a semi-mystical sect of ‘sweet singers.’ Occasionally Renwick and his followers crept into churches by night and held their meetings. In 1684 efforts were made to apprehend him. In July he was nearly taken by a party of dragoons, but escaped with the loss of his papers. Letters of intercommuning (interdiction) were issued against him on 24 September. His followers hereupon urged the defiant measure of a new declaration, to which Renwick was at first averse. But in October he drew up ‘the Apologetical Declaration’ which, by concerted action, was affixed to a number of market crosses and church doors on 8 November 1684. It claimed the right of dealing with the agents of authority as enemies of God, and ‘murdering beasts of prey.’ Two gentlemen of the king's lifeguards having been slain in an onset upon a field-meeting, the privy council ordered the death penalty for all who refused to disown this declaration on oath. The Scottish parliament, in April 1685, passed a statute making any acknowledgment of the covenant an act of treason. This led to the second Sanquhar declaration, promulgated by Renwick and his followers on 28 May 1685.

Renwick refused to join the insurrection of 1685 under Archibald Campbell, 9th Earl of Argyll. He was in sympathy with its object, but held aloof from a movement not distinctly put on the basis of the covenant. Hence he alienated many of his own party. His old friend, Sir Alexander Gordon, then a prisoner at Blackness, turned against him. He was viewed as a man who would only act by himself. Robert Cathcart, a Wigtownshire covenanter, protested against him; Alexander Peden was estranged from him, though they were reconciled on Peden's deathbed; Henry Erskine peremptorily rejected his overtures. He found associates in David Houston, a turbulent Irish covenanter (see Reid, ed. Killen, 1867, ii. 328 sq.), and Alexander Shields, his biographer.

James VII's Scottish proclamations of indulgence (12 February and 28 June 1687) gave full liberty for presbyterians to assemble for their worship in meeting-houses or private residences, on condition of registration and taking an oath of allegiance. Field conventicles were still prohibited. The conditions were satisfactory to all but Renwick and his followers, who would acknowledge no royal prerogative of dispensation, and insisted on maintaining their field-meetings. On 5 October a proclamation ordered the utmost severity against such meetings; and on 18 October a reward of 100/. was offered to any one who would deliver up Renwick, dead or alive. His friends must have been very faithful to him, for he made his way about the country, and, narrowly escaping arrest at Peebles, reached Edinburgh, where he lodged a protest against the indulgence with Hugh Kennedy, moderator of the Edinburgh presbytery, and afterwards got it promulgated. At the end of the year he preached for several Sundays in Fifeshire; on 29 January 1688 he preached for the last time at Bo'ness. Returning to Edinburgh, he lodged on the night of 31 January at a smuggler's receiving house on the Castlehill. A customs officer, John Justice, who was watching the house, heard him at family prayer, and suspected who it was. Next morning (1 Feb.) Justice surprised him and endeavoured to effect his arrest. Renwick defended himself with a pistol, and got away to the Castlewynd in the Cowgate, where he was seized and taken to the Tolbooth.

=== Trial and execution ===
James Renwick at the Grassmarket

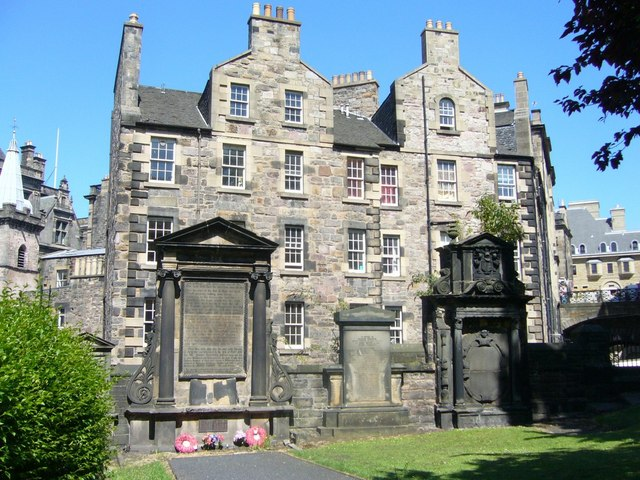
Martyrs' Monument, Greyfriars Kirkyard

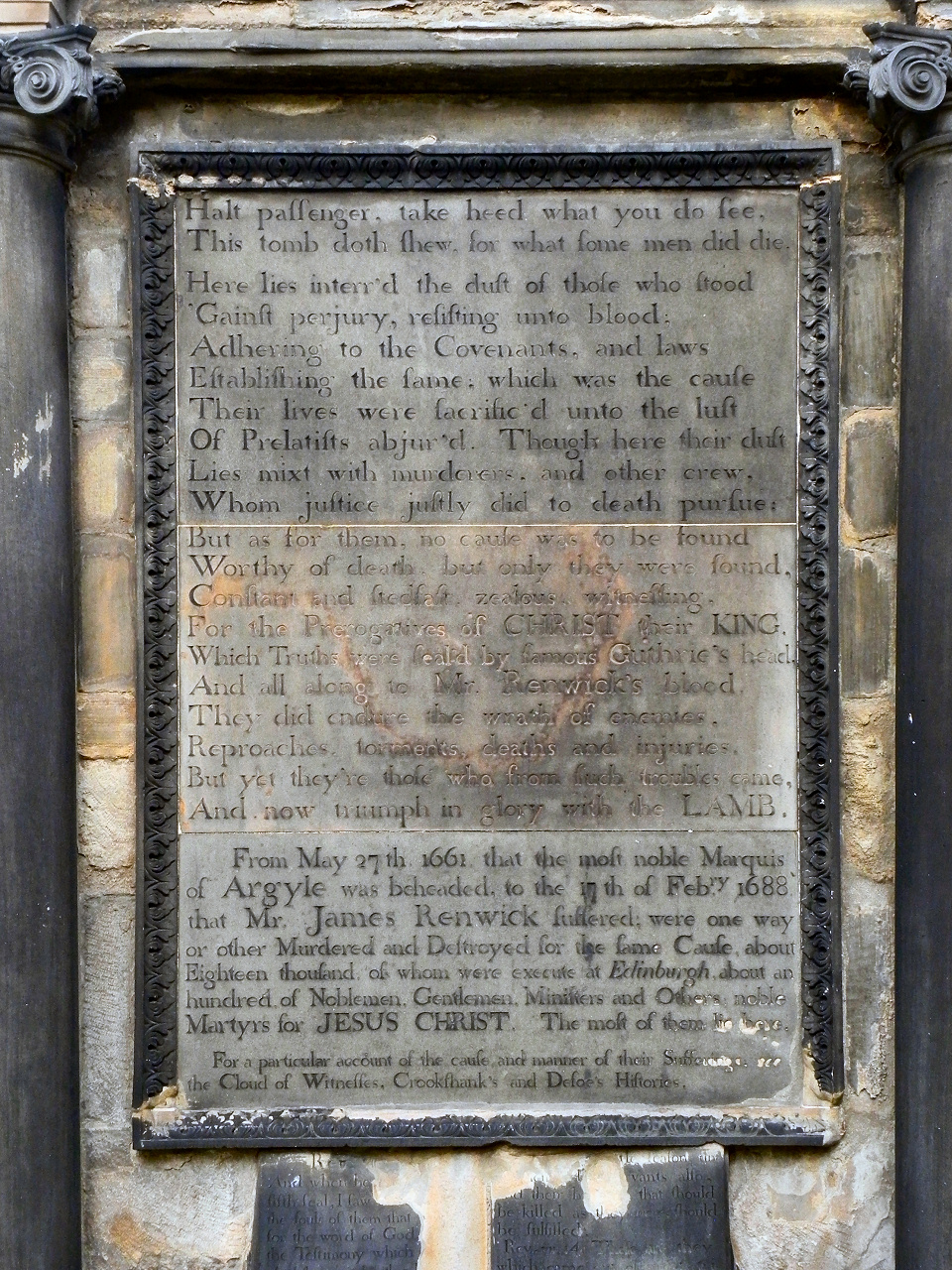
Martyrs' Monument (inscription). The central section mentions Renwick's blood.

Disruption brooch showing the graves of Andrew Melville, John Knox, David Welsh, James Renwick, and Alexander Henderson

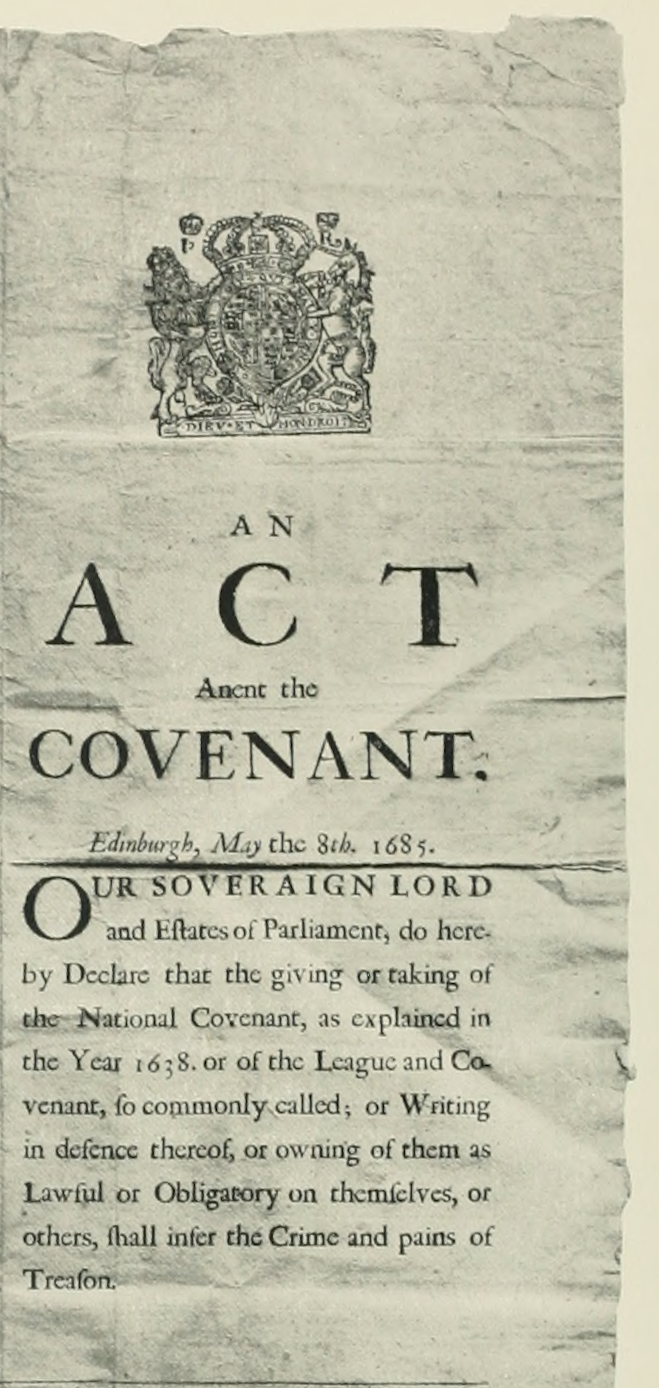
Edinburgh May 8th 1685 Our Soveraign Lord and the Estates of Parliament, do here by Declare that the giving or taking of the National Covenant as explained in the Year 1638 or of the League and Covenant, so commonly called, or writing in defence thereof or owning them as Lawful or Obligatory on themselves or others shall infer the Crime and pains of Treason.

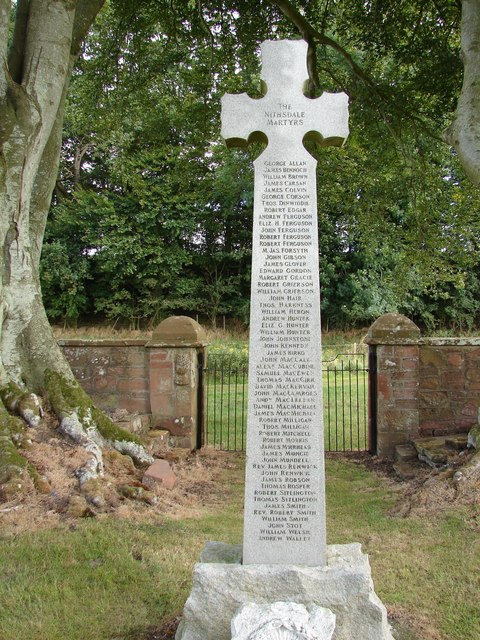
Dalgarnock Churchyard Cross - mentions Renwick

In 1688, he was finally captured and ordered to swear fealty to King James VII. He replied,

"No! I own all authority that has its prescriptions and limitations from the Word of God; but I cannot own this usurper as lawful king, seeing both by the Word of God such a one is incapable to bear rule, and also by the ancient laws of the kingdom which admit none to the Crown of Scotland until he swear to defend the Protestant Religion, which a man of his profession cannot do."

Graham, the captain of the guard, struck with his slight build, small stature, and youthful look, exclaimed: ‘What, is this the boy Renwick that the nation hath been so much troubled with?’

Under examination by the privy council he concealed nothing, and made a favourable impression by his frankness and courage. He was indicted (3 Feb.) on three counts - disowning the king's authority, maintaining the unlawfulness of paying the cess, and the lawfulness of defensive arms. Before his trial his mother and other friends were admitted to see him. On 8 February he was tried by the court of session and a jury of fifteen. The trial was conducted with unusual moderation, but Renwick's answers to interrogatories fully admitted the truth of all three charges, and he was sentenced to be hanged in the Grassmarket on 12 February. Subsequently, and contrary to his wishes, he was reprieved to 17 February. After sentence his friends were denied access to him, but he was visited by numbers of the clergy, catholic, episcopalian, and presbyterian of the moderate sort. John Paterson, archbishop of Glasgow, was frequently with him, trying hard to get him to petition for a further reprieve, which would certainly have been granted, and his life might have been saved. But Renwick was immovable in his determination to suffer for his principles; it became a proverb, ‘Begone, as Mr. Renwick said to the priests.’ Renwick was thereupon sentenced to die by hanging.

On 16 February he penned his dying testimony and a letter to his followers. Even on the morning of his execution he was offered his life if he would sign a petition for pardon. On the scaffold he sang a psalm, read a chapter, and prayed at length. The sentence was carried out on 17 February 1688, in the Grassmarket, Edinburgh. Following his execution, Renwick's head and hands were severed and affixed to the gates of the city.

He is celebrated as the last of the martyrs of the covenant, James Guthrie being one of the first. The two are thus commemorated in the inscription upon the ‘martyrs' monument’ in the kirkyard at Greyfriars' Kirk, where the original Covenant of 1638 has been signed:

But as for them, no cause was to be found
Worthy of death but only they were found,
Constant and steadfast, zealous witnessing
For the Prerogatives of CHRIST their KING
Which Truths were seal'd by famous Guthrie's head,
And all along to Mr. Renwick's blood,
They did endure the wrath of enemies
Reproaches, torments, deaths and injuries
But yet they're those who from such troubles came
And now triumph in glory with the LAMB.

The monument marks Renwick's burial-place, being fixed to the wall close to the spot where criminals were interred.

== Legacy ==
Before the year was out, James VII was in exile, and the persecution of Covenanters was over, although this was replaced from 1689 onwards by persecution of Episcopalians. The Covenanters saw his death as the herald of a more gracious day. "He was of old Knox's principles," his adversaries said, when they noted his unassailable steadfastness. But we may take our farewell of him in words which were written by one who loved him dearly: "When I speak of him as a man, none more comely in features, none more prudent, none more heroic in spirit, yet none more meek, more humane and condescending. He learned the truth and counted the cost, and so sealed it with his blood." An ‘Elegie’ on his death, by Shields, was published in Edinburgh, in 1688. A monument to his memory has been erected near his birthplace. Renwick seems to have published nothing, but after his death was issued ‘A Choice Collection of very valuable Prefaces, Lectures, and Sermons, preached upon the Mountains and Muirs … transcribed from several Manuscripts,’ &c. To the fourth edition (Glasgow, 1777, 8vo) were added his ‘Form and Order of Ruling Elders,’ and other pieces. It may be noted that ‘prefaces’ are exhortations before prayer. In the John Rylands Library at Manchester is a manuscript volume containing transcripts of letters by Renwick and others, made soon after his death.

== Bibliography ==
- Smellie, Rev. Alexander. The Men of the Covenant. Scotland, 1903
- Paterson, R C. A Land Afflicted, Scotland And The Covenanter Wars, 1638–1690. Edinburgh, 1998
- Purves, Jock. Sweet Believing. Stirling, 1954
- Life, by Shields, reprinted from the edition of 1724, in Biographia Presbyteriana, 1827, vol. ii., abridged in Howie's Scots Worthies (Buchanan), 1862, pp. 612 sq., further abridged in Anderson's Scottish Nation, 1872, ii. 339 sq.;
- Wodrow's Hist. of the Church of Scotland (Burns), 1828, vol. iv.
- Catalogue of Edinburgh Graduates, 1858, p. 117;
- Grub's Ecclesiastical Hist. of Scotland, 1861, iii. 280 sq.
- Irving's Book of Scotsmen, 1881, pp. 430 sq.

=== Biographers ===
Renwick, being the last of "the Covenanter martyrs", was extensively written about by many Scottish biographers, among them Alexander Shields and John Howie, as already mentioned. In 1865, Renwick's collected writings were published with an extensive biographical preface penned by Thomas Houston. Also in the mid-19th century, John Mackay Wilson published his Tales of the Borders, which contained a detailed narrative of Renwick's capture. The 2016 historical novel Last Execution at Grassmarket by H. Michael Buck also deals with Renwick.

== See also ==
- History of Scotland
- The Killing Time
