= Alexander Shields =

Scottish minister and activist (1661–1700)

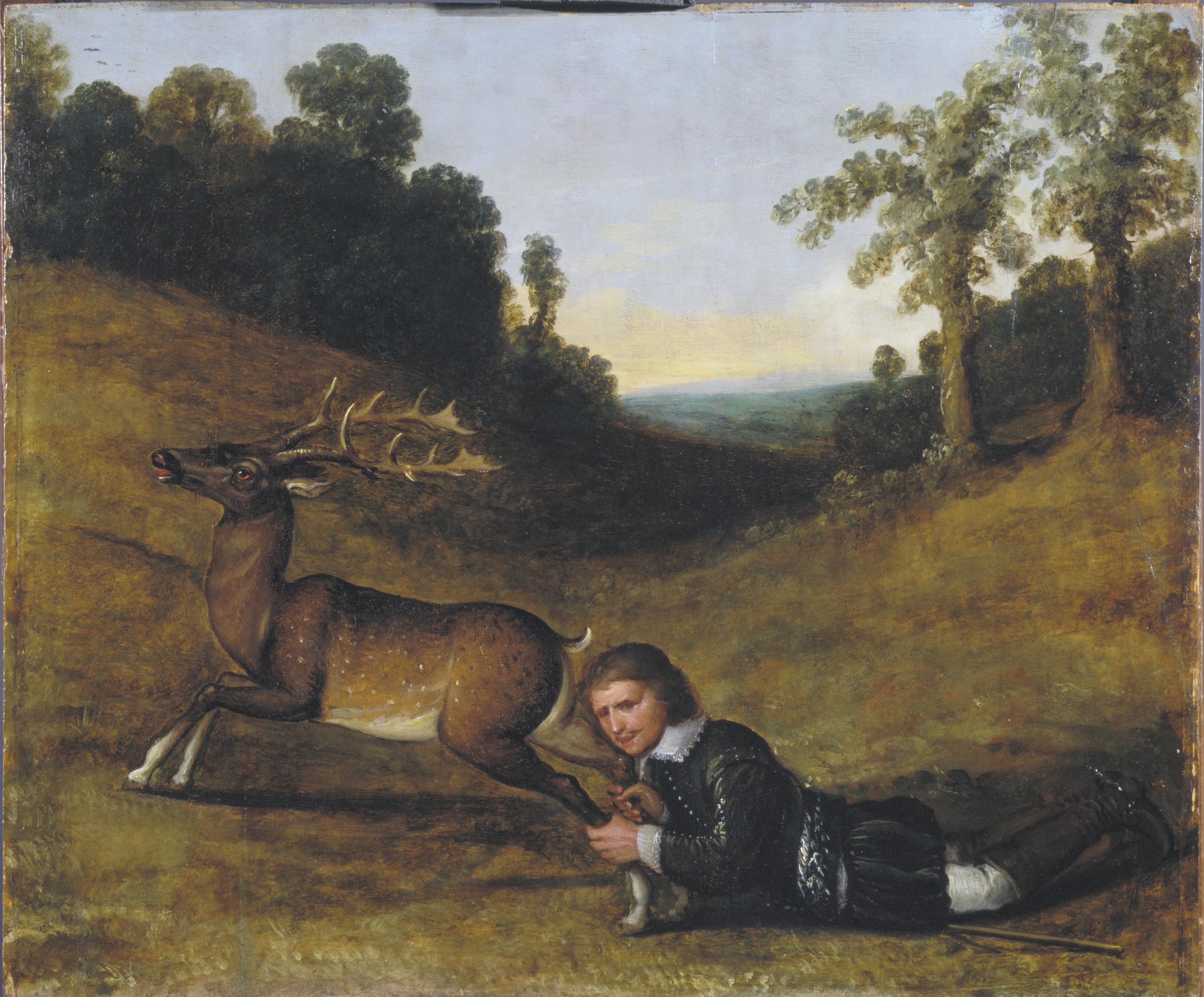
- Shields' most famous work is A Hind Let Loose. This refers to the words in Genesis 49, v21 : "Naphtali is a hind let loose" and is a prophecy about that tribe of Israel. Shields was on the stairs preaching on this passage about "the excellency of the blessing of liberty" when he was arrested in London.
- Title: Mr. (he was a graduate)

Personal life
- Born: 1661
- Died: 1700 (aged 38–39) Port Royal, Jamaica
- Resting place: unknown
- Education: University of Edinburgh; University of Utrecht

Religious life
- Religion: Christianity
- School: Presbyterianism
- Profession: Preacher

Alexander Shields or Sheilds or Sheills (January 1661 – 1700) was a Scottish, Presbyterian, nonconformist minister, activist, and author. He was imprisoned in London, in Edinburgh and on the Bass Rock for holding private worship services. After his escape from prison he wrote A Hind Let Loose which amongst other things argues for the rights of people to resist tyrants including the bearing of arms and the resistance of taxes. It even argues that assassination, in extreme cases, is sometimes justified. Shields was one of the ministers who supported the Cameronians who disowned the king. They were brutally put down. All three of the Cameronian field-preachers, of which Shields was one, rejoined the church after the Revolution. Shields served as a chaplain to King William's armies in the Low Countries. Shields was later called to be a minister at St Andrews but did not stay there long as he joined the second Darien Expedition. After its failure he died on Jamaica, shortly under 40 years of age.

== Early life and student days ==
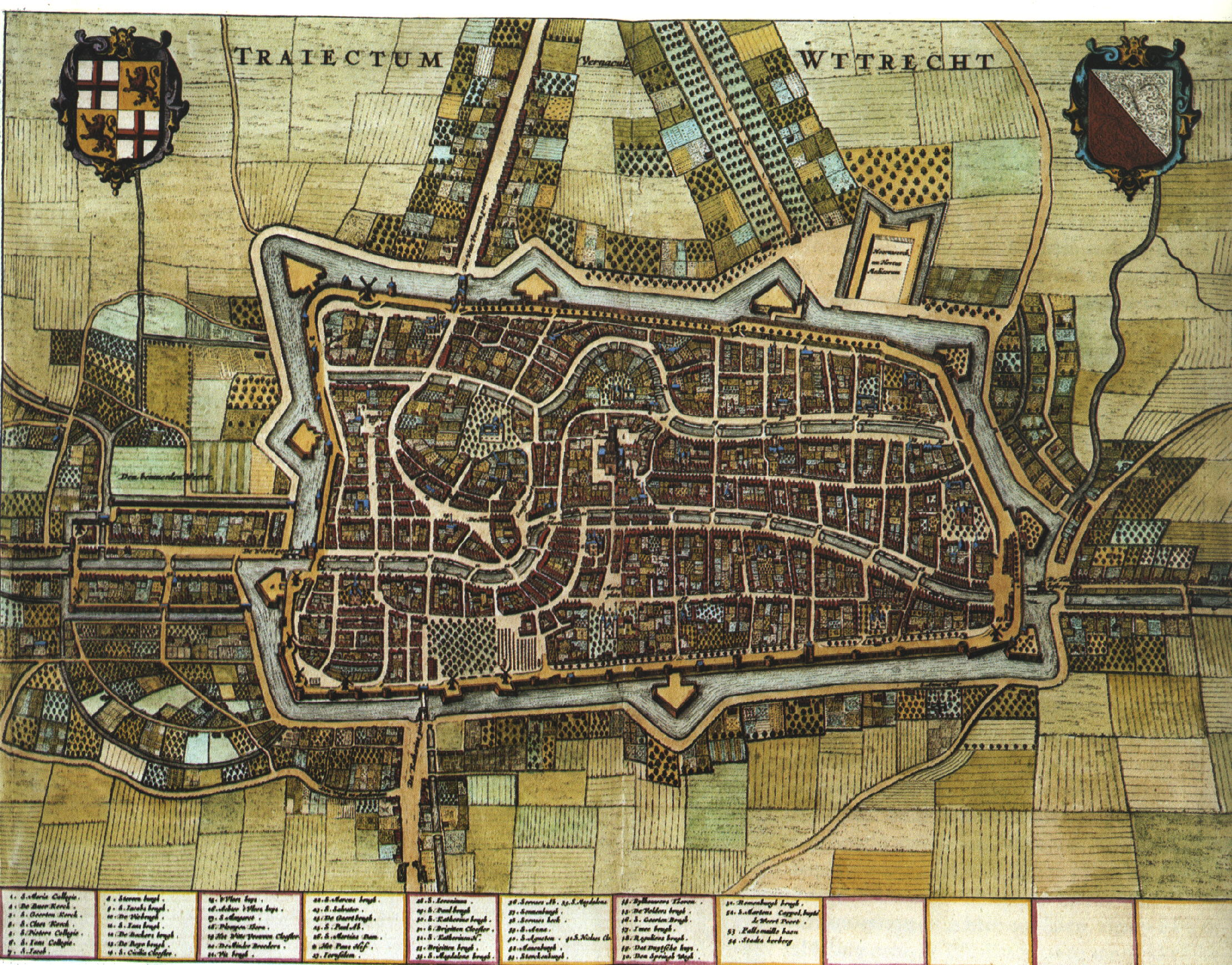
Map of Utrecht, where Shields studied in 1680. Joan Blaeu, 1652

Alexanders Shields was born in 1661, the son of James Shields, a miller, from Haughhead in the parish of Earlston, Berwickshire. His mother was Helen Brown. He was the brother of Michael Shields, author of Faithful Contendings Displayed. He was educated at the University of Edinburgh, where he graduated M.A., "with no small applause," whilst in his fifteenth year (7 April 1675), writing his surname Sheils. He later wrote it Sheilds; it is often printed "Shields". He began the study of divinity under Lawrence Charteris, but his opposition to prelacy led him, with others, to migrate in 1679 to Holland. He studied theology at the University of Utrecht, entering in 1680 as "Sheill".

== In London ==
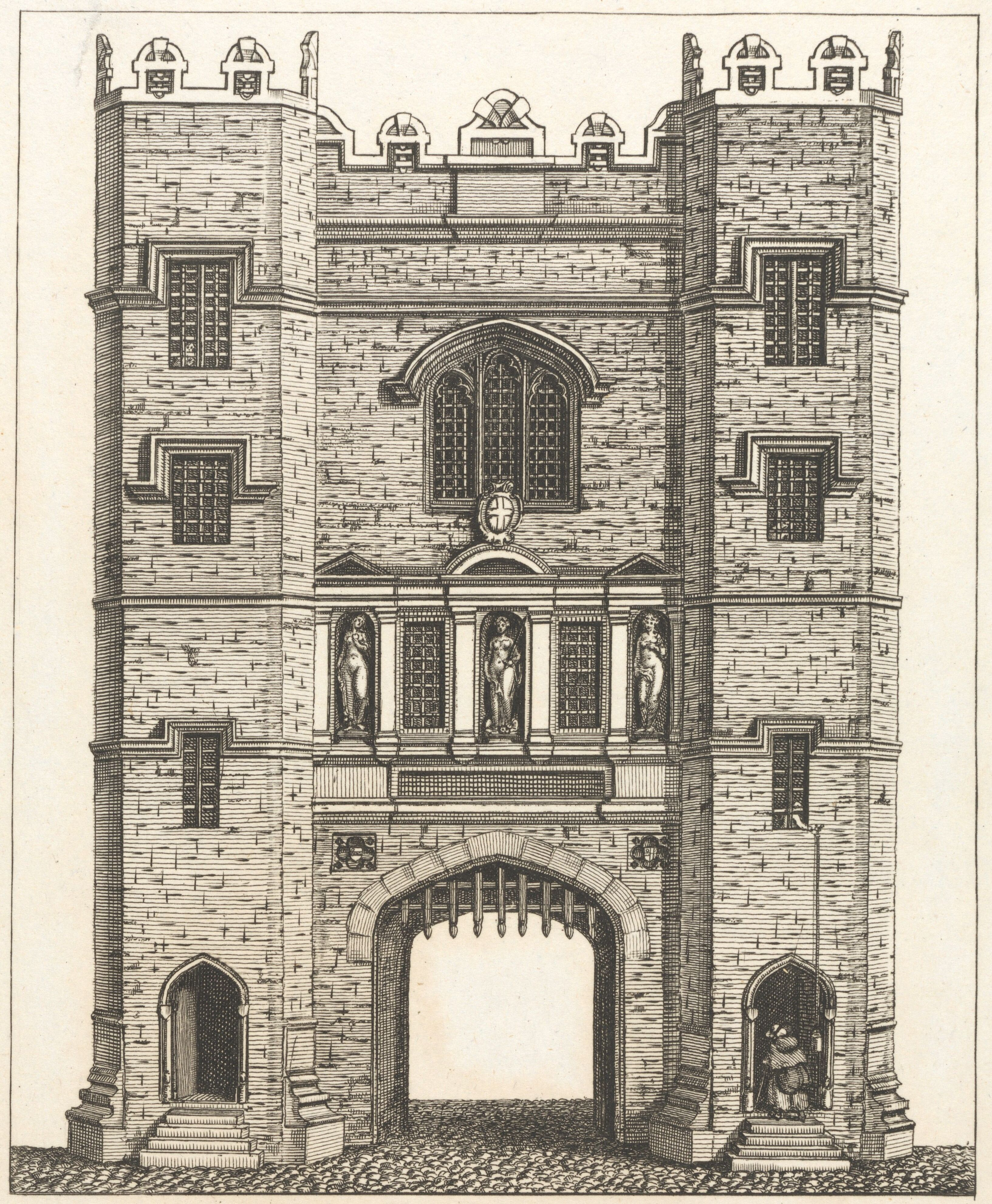
Newgate, the old city gate and prison

On returning home he made his way to London and was private secretary to John Owen. He came into close touch with some of the leading Puritans. Supported by Nicholas Blaikie, minister of the Scottish church at Founders' Hall, Lothbury, he was licensed as preacher by Scottish presbyterians in London, declining as a Covenanter the oath of allegiance. Strict measures being taken shortly after (1684) for the enforcement of the oath, Shields proclaimed its sinfulness, and his licensers threatened to withdraw their licence.

Shields appears to have bound himself by the Apologetical Declaration issued by James Renwick in November 1684. On Sunday, 11 January 1685, he was apprehended, with seven others, while preaching from the words in Genesis xlix., 21 : "Naphtali is a hind let loose," — afterwards the title of his famous Treatise. Captured by the city marshal at this conventicle in Embroiderers' Hall, Gutter Lane, Cheapside, he was brought before the lord mayor, who took bail for his appearance at the London Guildhall on the 14th. He attended on that day, but being out of court when his name was called, his bail was forfeited. Duly appearing on the 20th, he declined to give any general account of his opinions, and was committed (by his own account, decoyed) to Newgate Prison till the next quarter sessions (23 February). King Charles II died in the interval.

== Imprisonment in Scotland ==
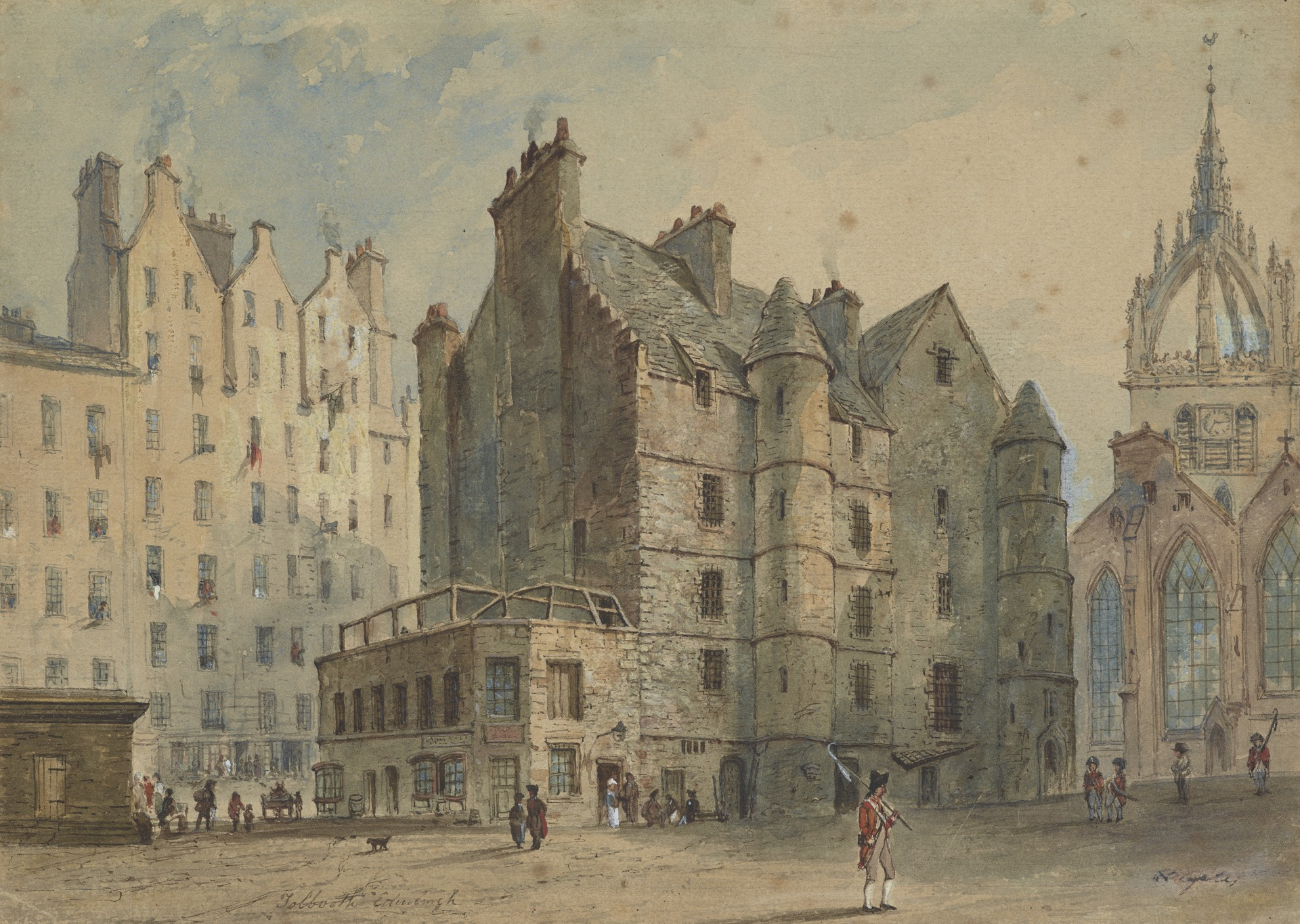
The Tolbooth (a Covenanting prison) which Shields escaped from dressed as a woman on 22 October 1686. Two keepers, John Wanse and Arthur Udney lost their jobs over the affair.

Without trial in England, Shields and his friends were sent to Scotland on 5 March, arriving at Leith by the yacht Kitchen on 13 March. Shields was examined by the Scottish privy council on 14 March, and by the lords justices on 23 and 25 March, but persisted in declining direct answers. At length, on 26 March, under threat of torture, he was drawn to what he calls a "fatal fall". He signed a paper renouncing all previous engagements "in so far as they declare war against the king". This was accepted as satisfactory, but he was still detained in prison. A letter to his friend John Balfour of Kinloch, expressing regret for his compliance, fell into the hands of the authorities. They sent the two archbishops, Arthur Ross and Alexander Cairncross, with Andrew Bruce, bishop of Dunkeld, to confer with him. On 6 August he was again before the lords justices, and renewed his renunciation, adding the words "if so be such things are there inserted". A few days later he was sent to the Bass Rock; he escaped in women's clothes, apparently at the end of November 1686. Anderson says: "About the autumn of 1686, he with the other ministers imprisoned in the Bass were brought to Edinburgh, and had their liberty offered them, provided they would engage to live orderly. Refusing when brought before the Council, to come under this engagement, he was recommitted to the tolbooth of Edinburgh, but he succeeded in making his escape from it disguised in women's clothes." In a footnote he comments: "Howie, in his Scots Worthies, erroneously says that it was from the Bass that Shields made his escape."

== Activities on escape ==
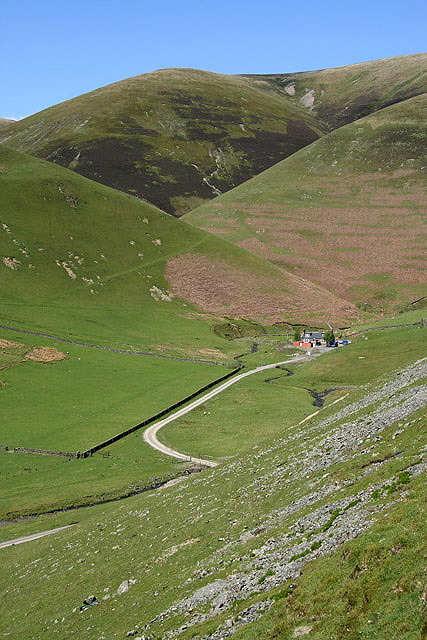
Upper Dalveen - site of a Sheills conventicle

Shields made his way at once to Renwick, whom he found on 6 December 1686 at a field conventicle at Earlston Wood, parish of Borgue, Kirkcudbrightshire. On 18 October 1687 the Privy Council put a price of 100 Sterling on the heads of Shields, Renwick and Houston. On 22 December, at a general meeting of Renwick's followers, he publicly confessed the guilt of "owning the so-called authority" of James VII of Scotland. His Hind Let Loose is a vindication of Renwick's position on historical grounds. The two became fast friends, and collaborated in writing the Informatory Vindication, for which Renwick was condemned. Shields was asked to superintend its publication, but failed to find a printer. He crossed to Holland, saw the work through the Press there, and busied himself with the completion of his Hind. He went to Holland (1687) to get it printed, but returned to Scotland, leaving it at press.

After the death of Donald Cargill on the scaffold, the United Societies were left without a minister. They could not ordain their own ministers because in their own eyes they lacked the authority as ordination is done at Presbytery level; they did not claim to be a separate church. James Renwick was sent by them to be ordained by Dutch ministers. When Renwick was killed, also on the scaffold, Shields became their leading minister.

After Renwick's execution (17 February 1688) Shields pursued his policy of field meetings, preaching on a celebrated occasion at Distincthorn Hill, parish of Galston, Ayrshire. He became the recognised leader of the United Societies, and to the general meetings of the Societies his brother Michael acted as clerk. He certainly approved of the Cameronian insurrection, under Daniel Ker of Kersland, at the end of the year, when the incumbents of churches in the west were forcibly driven from their charges. He was present at the gathering at the cross of Douglas, Lanarkshire, where these proceedings were publicly vindicated; giving out a psalm, he explained that it was the same as had been sung by Robert Bruce at the cross of Edinburgh, on the dispersion of the Spanish Armada. On 3 March 1689, with Thomas Lining and William Boyd, he took part in a solemn renewing of the covenants by a concourse of people at Borland Hill, parish of Lesmahagow, Lanarkshire.

== After the Revolution ==
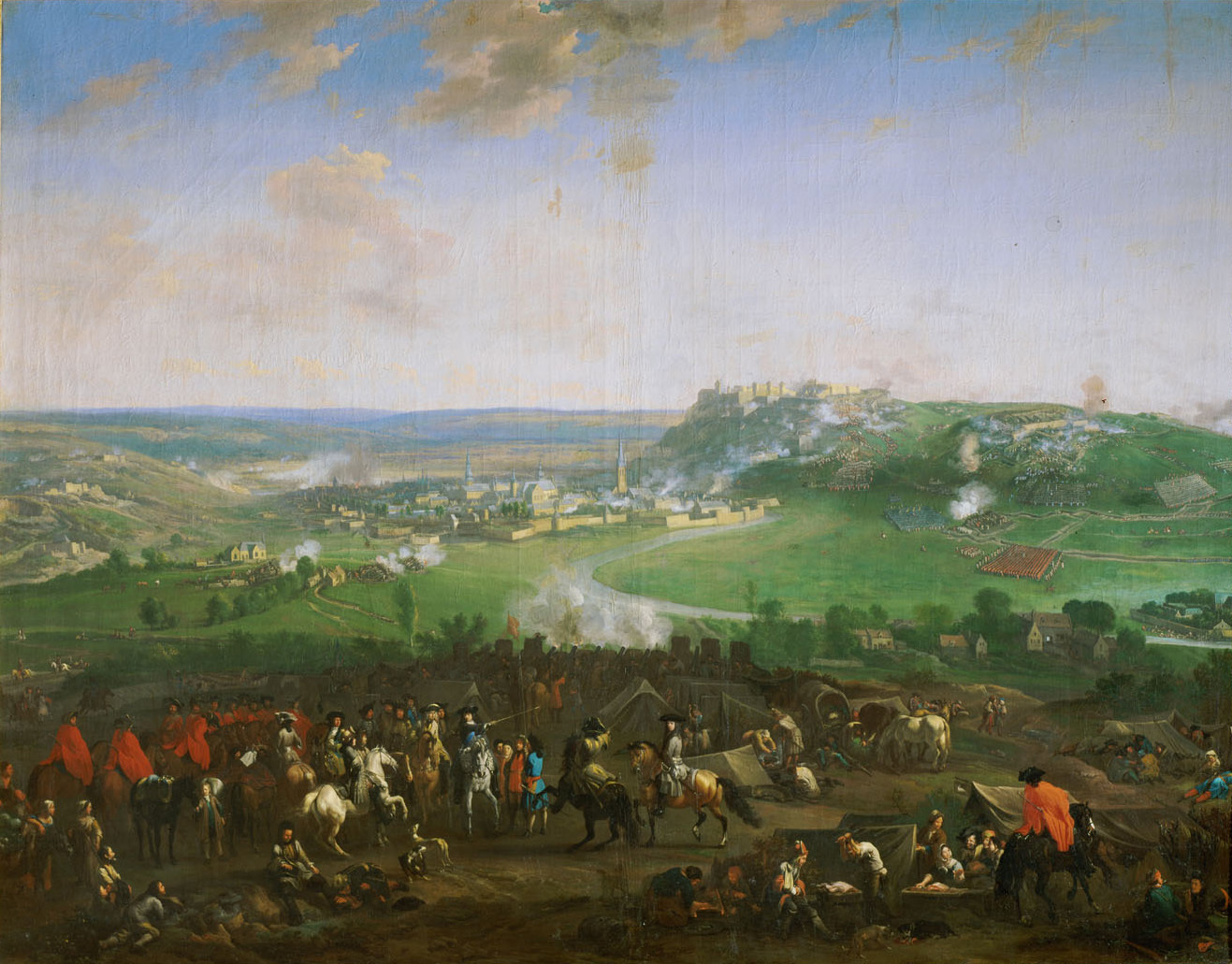
The siege of Namur

After the Revolution Shields joined the Church of Scotland, and was received into communion, 25 October 1690, with his associates, Thomas Lining and William Boyd.

On the meeting of the first general assembly under the Presbyterian settlement, Lining, Shields, and Boyd presented two papers, the first asking for redress of grievances, the second (an afterthought, according to Shields) proposing terms of submission. The paper of grievances the assembly received, but declined to have publicly read, as contentious. The submission, dated 22 October 1690, was accepted on 25 October, and the three signatories were received into fellowship, with an admonition "to walk orderly in time coming". Shields was appointed on 4 February 1691 chaplain to the Cameronian regiment (26th Foot), raised in 1689 by James, Earl of Angus (1671–1692), son of James Douglas, 2nd Marquess of Douglas.

He served in the Netherlands, and was present at Namur and Steinkerk. On the Peace of Ryswick he returned home, was called to St Andrews on 4 February 1696, and admitted 15 September 1697.

== Darien expedition ==
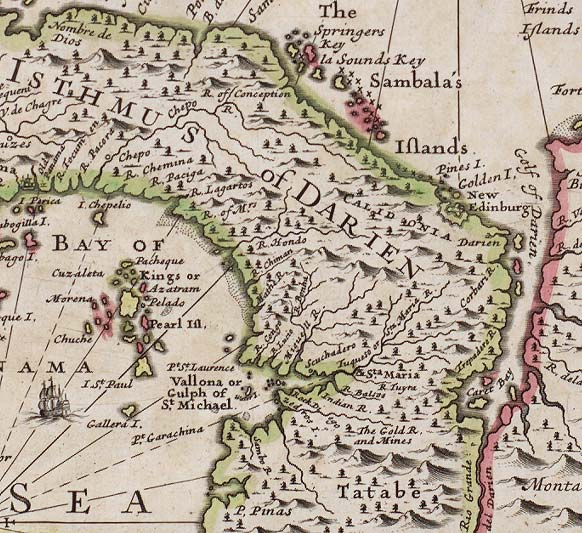
"A New Map of the Isthmus of Darien in America, The Bay of Panama, The Gulph of Vallona or St. Michael, with its Islands and Countries Adjacent".

On 21 July 1699 he was authorised by the commission of the general assembly to proceed, with three other ministers, Francis Borland, Alexander Dalgleish and Archibald Stobo, and a number of colonists, to Darien, this being the second expedition in pursuance of the ill-fated scheme of William Paterson. They sailed in the Rising Sun on Sunday 24 September 1699, his charge at home being supplied by brethren in his absence. Shields and his companions were really the first foreign missionaries of the Church of Scotland, the Commission of Assembly having, on 21 July, charged them "particularly that you labour among the natives for their instruction and conversion, as you have access." He was appointed senior minister; they reached Darien late in November 1699. There were quarrels among the colonists. In a letter to the Presbytery of St Andrews, dated 2 February 1700, Shields wrote :"Our meetings amongst ourselves are in the woods, where the chattering of parrots, mourning of pelicans, and din of monkeys is more pleasant than the hellish language of our countrymen in their huts and tents of Kedar; and our converse with the Indians, though with dumb signs, is more satisfying than with the most part of our own people. Several of them came to our meetings for worship, and we have exercised in their families when travelling among them, where they behaved themselves very reverently, but we have neither language nor interpreter. But our people do scandalise them, both by stealing from them and teaching them to swear and drink." Shields made some expeditions inland; at length, with Francis Borland, he crossed over to Jamaica, but had scarcely arrived there before he went down with fever. He died on 14 June 1700 in the house of Isabel Murray at Port Royal, Jamaica. He left property valued at £6,483 16s. 10d.

== Death and burial ==
On the failure of the Expedition, he sailed for Scotland, heart-broken by the profligacy of the settlers and the little success his labours had met among them, but died of malignant fever in the house of Isobel Murray, Port Royal, Jamaica, 14 June 1700. All attempts to identify his burial-place have failed. He was unmarried.

== Descendants and character ==
Descendants of his brother Michael, who accompanied the Expedition, and of other members of his family are still found in Jamaica. Shields was "of low stature, ruddy complexion, quick and piercing wit, full of zeal, and firm in the cause he espoused; pretty well skilled in most branches of learning, in arguing very ready, only somewhat fiery; but in writing on controversy he exceeded most men of that age."

== Theology ==
According to MacPherson this is mainly from 2 books: An Enquiry into Church-Communion and A Hind Let Loose.

The second of these, A Hind let Loose, is divided into a historical part and a theoretical part. At the beginning of the historical survey of the history of the Scottish Church from the Culdees downward. It is (says MacPherson) in the second half of the book that Shields’ power as a thinker is manifested. Under seven heads, he discusses the fundamental social, political, and ecclesiastical questions of the day. These heads are concerning (i) hearing of curates, (ii) owning of tyrants’ authority, (iii) unlawful imposed oaths, (iv) field meetings, (v) defensive arms vindicated, (vi) the extraordinary execution of judgment by private persons, and (vii) refusing to pay wicked taxations vindicated. The last-named section was added, Shields tells us, as an afterthought. Some Scottish Presbyterians were at the time refusing to pay their church rates, which went to support the establishment episcopal church, and Shields defended their practice.

The first book is an appeal to the people of the "United Societies" to join the Church of Scotland which was reconstituted after the revolution. Shields made his case for unity, and against schism, in the book An Enquiry into Church-Communion. Vogan discusses the arguments in detail, applying them to various scandalous divisions.

== Works ==
Shields published:

- A Hind Let Loose, or an Historical Representation of the Testimonies of the Church of Scotland … by a Lover of True Liberty, 1687 (no printer or place of publication); reprinted Edinburgh, 1744; epitomised as A History of the Scotch Presbytery, 1691. The Scotch Presbyterian Eloquence (1692) describes the Hind Let Loose as "the great oracle and idol of the true covenanters" (p. 58). The title of this work is biblical; but it was suggested by John Dryden's The Hind and the Panther (published April 1687). It defended the murder of Archbishop James Sharp, and charged James II with poisoning his brother.
- An Elegie upon the Death of … J. Renwick, 1688, (anon.), on James Renwick.
- Some Notes … of a Lecture preached at Distinckorn Hill (1688).
- The Renovation of the Covenant at Boreland (1689).
- A Short Memorial of the Sufferings … of the Presbyterians in Scotland, 1690, (anon.); reprinted as The Scots Inquisition, Edinburgh, 1745.
- An Account … of the late … Submission to the Assembly, Edinburgh, 1691.

Posthumous were:

- Church Communion enquired into; or a Treatise against Separation from this National Church of Scotland, [Edinburgh], 1706 (edited by Lining, who was accused of modifying it in the interest of union); reprinted as An Enquiry into Church-Communion, 2nd edit. Edinburgh, 1747.
- A True and Faithful Relation of … Sufferings, 1715.
- The Life and Death of … James Renwick, Edinburgh, 1724; reprinted, Glasgow, 1806; and in Biographia Presbyteriana, Edinburgh, 1827, vol. ii.
- The Perpetual Obligation of our Covenants in Richard Ward's Explanation … of the Solemn League, 1737.
- Two sermons and a lecture in John Howie's Collection, Glasgow, 1779; reprinted as Sermons … in Times of Persecution, Edinburgh, 1880 (edited by James Kerr).

== Bibliography ==
- A Hind Let Loose, or an Historical Representation of the Testimonies of the Church of Scotland [the first edition did not bear the author's name, but was "By a Lover of True Liberty"]
- (n.p., 1687; Edinburgh, 1744; Glasgow, 1770, 1797; epitomised as A History of the Scotch Presbytery (1691)
- An Elegie upon the Death of... J. Renwick [anon.] (1688)
- Some Notes of a Lecture preached at Distinckorn Hill (1688)
- The Renovation of the Covenant at Borland Hill [1689]
- Vindication of the Solemn League and Covenants
- Several Religious Letters both before and after the Revolution
- A Short Memorial of the Sufferings of the Presbyterians in Scotland [anon.] (1690), reprinted as The Scots Inquisition, containing a Brief Description of the Persecution of the Presbyterians in Scotland (Edinburgh, 1745)
- An Account of the Methods and Motives of the late Union and Submission to the Assembly of Mr Thomas Linning, Mr Alexander Shields, Mr William Boyd (Edinburgh, 1691)
- Church Communion enquired into, or a Treatise against Separation from this National Church of Scotland [edited by Linning] (1706), reprinted as An Enquiry into Church Communion (Edinburgh, 1747)
- A True and Faithful Relation of his Sufferings (n.p., 1715)
- Life of Mr James Renwick, and a Vindication of his dying Testimony (Edinburgh, 1724; Glasgow, 1806)
- The Perpetual Obligation of our Covenants [Wood's Explanation of the Solemn League] (1737)
- Two Sermons and a Lecture [Howie's Collection] (Glasgow, 1779); and in Sermons... in Times of Persecution [edited by James Kerr, D.D.] Edinburgh, 18S0)
- Letter to the Presbytery of St Andrews (Edin. Ch. Inst., xviii). — [Edin. Tests.
- Howie's Collect.
- Wilson's Dissent. Churches, iii., 126
- Fountainhall's Diary
- Wodrow's Analetica, i., 177 et seq.
- Borland's Memoirs of Darien, 42
- Dictionary of National Biography
- Article by W. S. Crockett in Life and Work, Sept. 1905
- Treasury of the Scottish Covenant, 372
- Darien Papers [Bannatyne Club] (1849), 247 et seq.
- Album Studiosorum [Utrecht], 1886, p. 74.
