= Battle of Bothwell Bridge =

Battle of the Covenanter rebellion of 1679

Coordinates: 55°47′45″N 4°03′28″W

- Part of the Covenanter rebellion of 1679
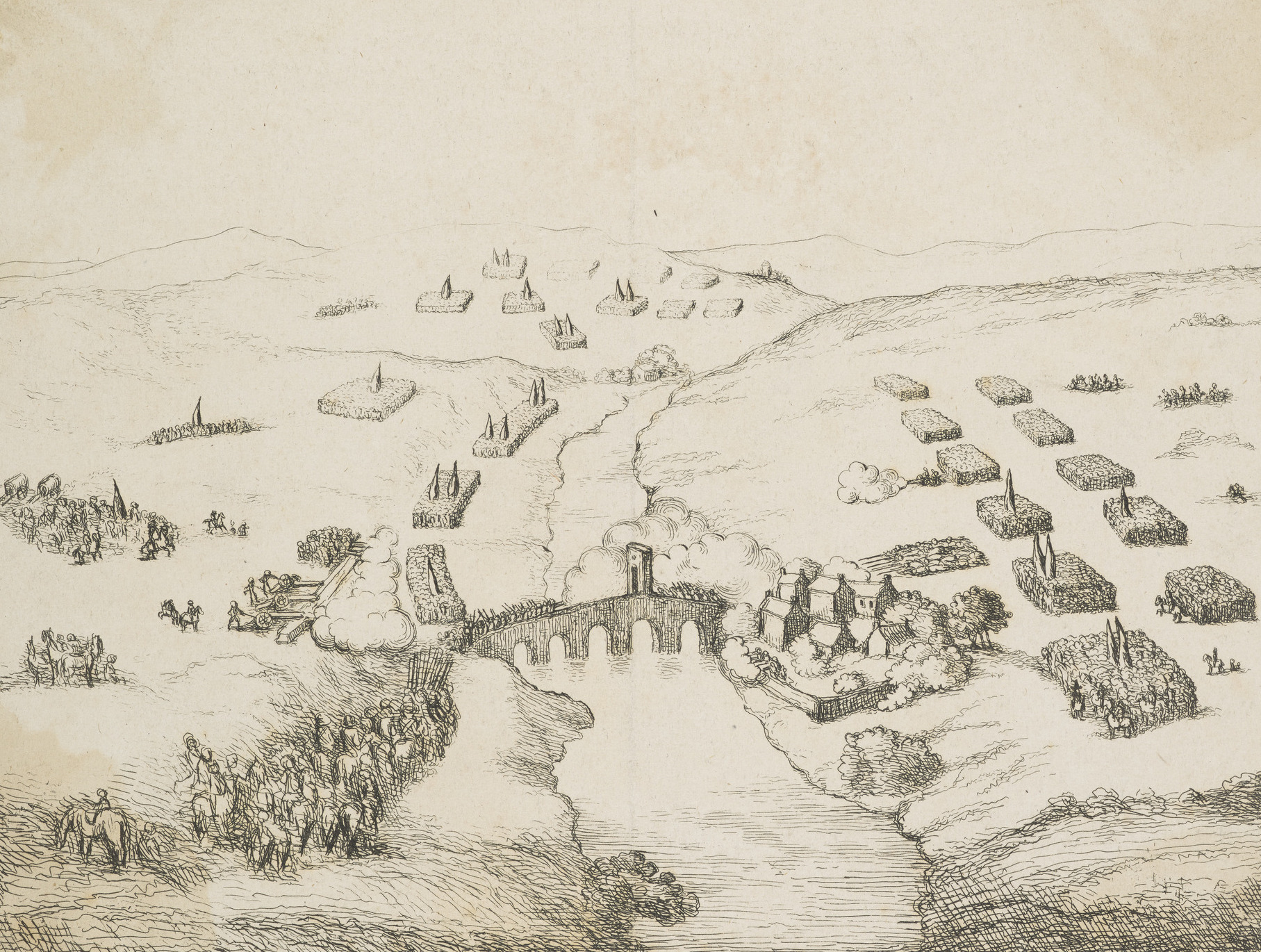
- Illustration of the battle
Date	22 June 1679
Location	Bothwell Bridge, near Bothwell, South Lanarkshire
Result	Government victory

Belligerents
Scottish Government	Covenanters

Commanders and leaders
Duke of Monmouth; John Graham	Robert Hamilton

Strength
c. 5,000	c. 6,000

Casualties and losses
Few	c. 600

Registered battlefield
- Designated: 21 March 2011
- Reference no.: BTL5

The Battle of Bothwell Bridge (also known as the Battle of Bothwell Brig) was fought on 22 June 1679 during the Covenanter rebellion of 1679. It was fought between government troops and militant Presbyterian Covenanters, and signalled the end of their brief rebellion. The battle took place at the bridge over the River Clyde between Hamilton and Bothwell in Lanarkshire, Scotland. The battlefield has been included in the Inventory of Historic Battlefields in Scotland and protected by Historic Scotland under the Historic Environment (Amendment) Act 2011.

== Background ==
Following the Stuart Restoration of King Charles II, the Presbyterians in Scotland were increasingly persecuted for their beliefs, and a small armed rising had been put down in 1666. Although some Presbyterian ministers were "Indulged" by the government from 1669, allowing them to retain their churches without having to accept Episcopacy, the more hard-line elements continued to hold illegal outdoor meetings, known as conventicles. These were often broken up by squads of government dragoons, including those led by John Graham of Claverhouse. On 1 June 1679, Claverhouse had encountered such a gathering near Loudoun Hill, but his troops were routed by armed Covenanters at the Battle of Drumclog, and he was forced to flee to Glasgow; this marked the beginning of the Covenanter rebellion of 1679. Following this initial success the Covenanters spent the next few weeks building their strength, as did the government. Charles' son the Duke of Monmouth was sent north to take command, and the militia were raised.

== Battle ==
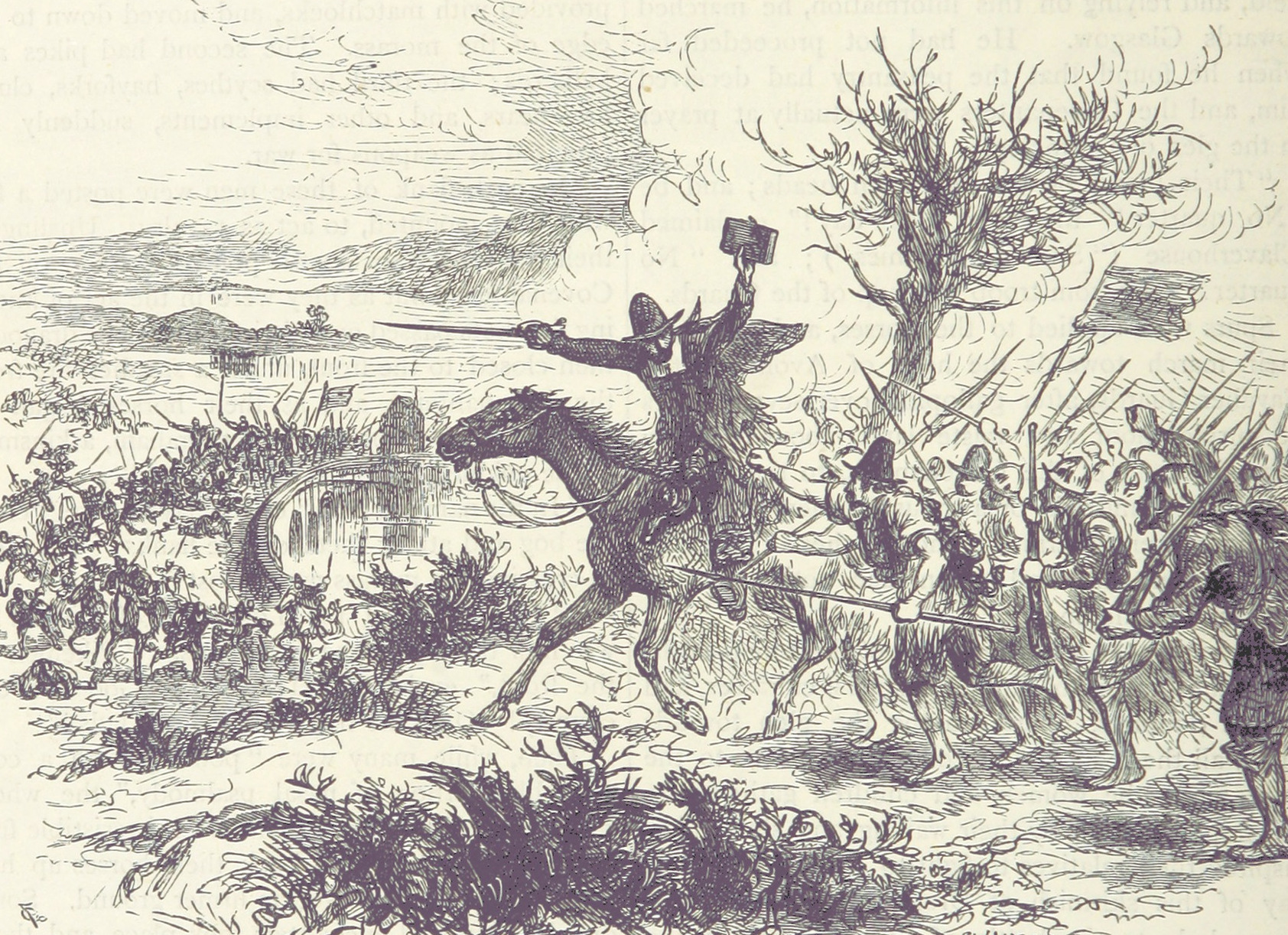
1873 illustration of the battle

The Covenanters had established their camp on the south bank of the Clyde, north of Hamilton. The rebels numbered around 6000 men. They were poorly disciplined and deeply divided by religious disagreements. They had few competent commanders, being nominally led by Robert Hamilton of Preston, although his rigid stance against the Indulged ministers only encouraged division.

The preachers Donald Cargill and John Welsh of Irongray were present, as was William Cleland, the victor of Drumclog, and David Hackston of Rathillet and John Balfour of Kinloch, known as Burley, who were among the group who murdered Archbishop Sharp on 3 May. James Ure of Shirgarton led a troop of 200 men from Stirlingshire at the battle and wrote an explanation of why the covenanters lost in his personal memoirs. The government army numbered around 5000 regular troops and militia, and was commanded by Monmouth, supported by Claverhouse and the Earl of Linlithgow. The royalist troops were massed on the northern or Bothwell bank of the river Clyde on sloping ground that included a field that has since become known as the Covenanters Field - not because the battle was fought there but because for many years it was the venue for a covenanters conventicle organised by the Scottish Covenanters Memorial Association.

The battle centred on the narrow bridge across the Clyde, the passage of which Monmouth was required to force in order to come at the Covenanters. Hackston led the defence of the bridge and had some initial success in the initial skirmishes at the bridge itself. But his men lacked artillery and ammunition, and were forced to withdraw. Once Monmouth's men were across the bridge, the Covenanters were quickly routed. Many fled into the parks of nearby Hamilton Palace, seat of Duchess Anne, who was sympathetic to the Presbyterian cause, and it was in this area that the final engagements took place. The numbers of covenanters who were killed varies widely with estimates ranging from 7 - 700 according to the Scottish Battles Gazetteer. Around 1200 were taken prisoner.

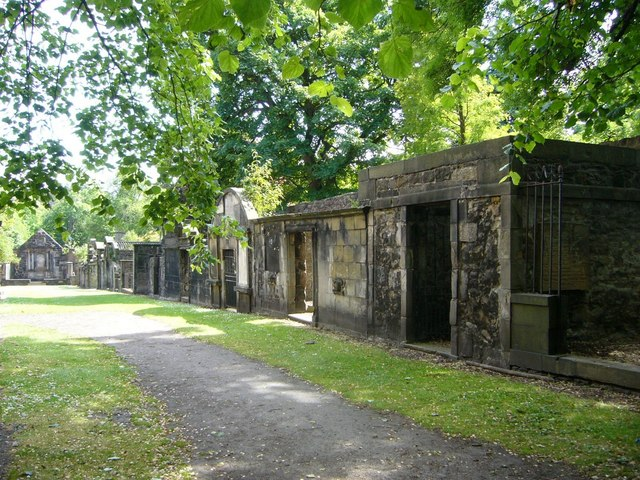
Covenanters Prison, Greyfriars Kirkyard

== Aftermath ==
The prisoners were taken to Edinburgh and held on land beside Greyfriars Kirkyard. This area is now known as the Covenanters' Prison. Many remained there for several months, until the last of them were transported to the colonies in November. However, a later ship wreck allowed 48 of the 257 prisoners to escape. All those who had taken part on the Covenanter side of the battle were declared rebels and traitors, and the repression during this period has become known as "the Killing Time" in Covenanter histories. A core of hard-line rebels remained in arms, and became known as the Cameronians after Richard Cameron their leader. Cameron was killed in a skirmish at Airds Moss the next year, but his followers were eventually pardoned on the accession of William and Mary in 1689.

== Memorials ==
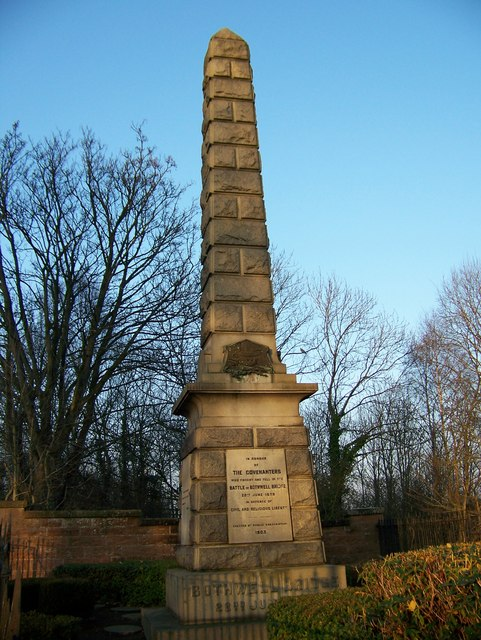
Monument to the battle

In 1903, on the 224th anniversary of the battle, a monument was dedicated on the site. This stands beside Bothwell Bridge, which was largely rebuilt in the 19th century.

The battle is a central event in Sir Walter Scott's 1816 novel, Old Mortality. Scott fictionalises the battle and the events leading up to it, introducing real people who were not actually present, such as General Tam Dalyell, as well as his own fictional characters. However, his description of the flow of the battle is considered accurate.

Letitia Elizabeth Landon's poetical illustration Claverhouse at the Battle of Bothwell Brig. follows her reading of Scott, whom she greatly admired. It relates to an engraving of a painting by W Hartley.
