= Lawrence Charteris =

Minister of the Church of Scotland

Lawrence Charteris (1625–1700) was an influential Scottish minister.

== Life ==
The grandson of Henry Charteris the elder, and a younger son of Henry Charteris the younger, he was educated at the University of Edinburgh, where he graduated M.A. in 1646. From 1651 to 1653 he was living within the bounds of the presbytery of Dalkeith, with or near to Robert Leighton, then minister of Newbattle, who had been a pupil of Charteris's father. In September 1654 Charteris was called to be minister of the parish of Bathans (now Yester), in the adjoining presbytery of Haddington. The church of Scotland was now divided into two sections, the resolutioners and protesters. Charteris, on ordination, said that he had not been a party to the protest: he sympathised with the resolutioners.

On the restoration of episcopacy in 1660 Charteris conformed, as did Leighton and the bulk of the Scottish clergy. He was in presbyterian orders, but, except in a few cases in the diocese of Aberdeen, there was no reordination of the parish ministers who had been appointed in the time of presbytery; only, to save the rights of patrons, those who had been admitted to benefices since 1649 were required to obtain presentation from the lawful patron, and collation from the bishop. Charteris had such collation in 1662, and for then for 13 years he remained minister of Yester. Charteris was close to Robert Douglas, Patrick Scougal who was bishop of Aberdeen in 1664, James Nairne, and Gilbert Burnet. He disapproved of actions of the bishops, and of the government.

In 1664 Charteris joined with Nairne in a protest against his diocesan's deposing a minister without the consent of his synod; and in 1669, when the Scottish bishops were coerced into voting for an act of supremacy, Charteris was one of the episcopal clergy who thought it went too far, according to Burnet. He did not accept a bishopric. In 1670, however, when Leighton became archbishop of Glasgow, Charteris consented to be one of six preachers whom Leighton sent to preach among the western Whigs in support of an accommodation between presbyterians and episcopalians.

In 1675 Charteris was chosen by the town council professor of divinity in the university of Edinburgh When, however, in 1681, under the government of James, Duke of York, a test was imposed, Charteris resigned his chair. He was followed by about 80 clergy. Three years later he visited Archibald Campbell, 1st Duke of Argyll, and prayed with him on the day of his execution.

In 1687 James II dispensed with the test, and in September 1688 Charteris was instituted to the parish of Dirleton in East Lothian. He took the oath of allegiance to William III and Mary II, and was there to 1697. But he showed himself independent, as before. In 1697 he retired on an allowance from his benefice, and died in Edinburgh in 1700, suffering from the stone. He did not marry.

== Works ==
On the Difference between True and False Christianity (1703), and On the Corruption of this Age (1704) were published after his death. In the latter work (republished by Robert Foulis, Glasgow, 1761) Charteris condemns the preaching at the celebration of the Lord's Supper, and pleads for the restoration of the public reading of the Bible in the services of the Church of Scotland.

The catalogue of Scottish divines in James Maidment's Catalogues was drawn up by Charteris for his friend Sir Robert Sibbald.
