= Sanquhar Declaration =

1680 speech in Scotland

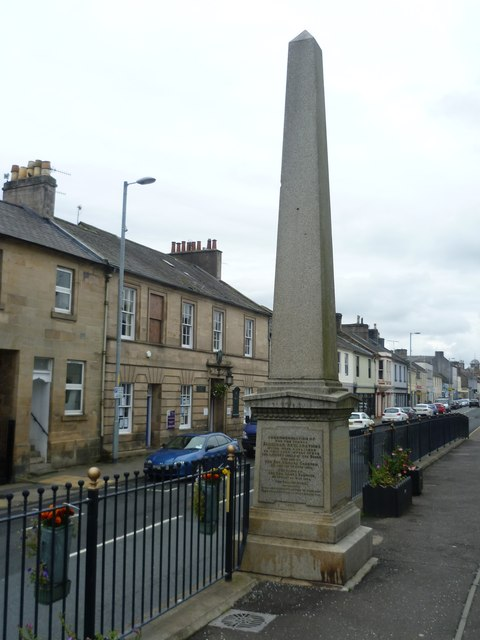
Sanquhar Declarations Monument

The Sanquhar Declaration was a speech read by Michael Cameron in the presence of his brother, the Covenanter leader Richard Cameron, accompanied by twenty armed men in the public square of Sanquhar, Scotland, on 22 June 1680. The speech disavowed allegiance to Charles II and the government of Scotland, in the name of "true Protestant and Presbyterian interest", due to opposition to government interference in religious affairs.

This symbolic demonstration, essentially a declaration of war, was among the first of a series of events that led to the Glorious Revolution and the end of the reign of the House of Stuart.

A second declaration was made by James Renwick on 28 May 1685.

A memorial was built and dedicated on 11 May 1864.
