= Reformed Presbyterian Global Alliance =

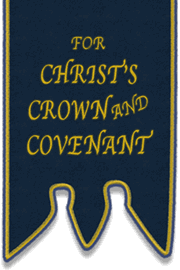
- Traditional "Blue Banner" insignia used by Reformed Presbyterians
- Type: Protestant
- Theology: Reformed
- Polity: Presbyterian
- Structure: Communion
- Origin: 1690
- Congregations: 156 (2021)
- Members: 10,156 (2021)
- Official website: rpglobalalliance.org

The Reformed Presbyterian Global Alliance is a communion of Presbyterians originating in Scotland in 1690 when its members refused to conform to the establishment of the Church of Scotland. The Reformed Presbyterian churches collectively have approximately 9,500 members worldwide in Northern Ireland, the Republic of Ireland, Scotland, France, the United States of America, Canada, Japan, South Sudan, and Australia.

== Organization and leadership ==
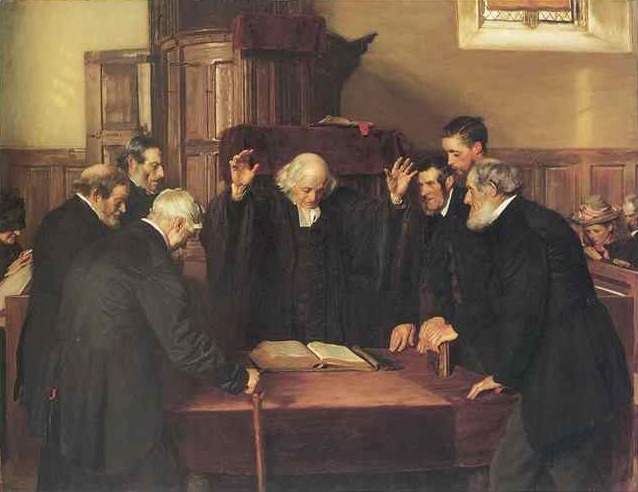
The Ordination of Elders in a Scottish Kirk, by John Henry Lorimer, 1891. National Gallery of Scotland.

The Reformed Presbyterian churches are presbyterian in polity; members of each congregation elect elders who must be male, as they believe the Bible requires, and who must also be members of the congregation. These elders, along with a minister or pastor, make up the "session" governing a congregation. Ministers are known as "teaching elders"; other elders are known as "ruling elders." The teaching elder is not in authority over the ruling elders, nor are the ruling elders in authority over the teaching elder.

The Reformed Presbyterian Church of North America has jurisdiction over the Japan Presbytery, and the Reformed Presbyterian Church of Ireland has a mission in the French city of Nantes. All of the communion's members form the RP Global Alliance. The RP Global Alliance refers to itself as a "consultative community of Reformed Presbyterian Churches worldwide."

Several denominations and individual churches not part of this group use the term "Reformed Presbyterian" in their names. While the Reformed Presbytery in North America (General Meeting) uses the name because of its claim to be the only true continuation of the RPCNA, most of these other churches are more distantly related and use the term for other reasons.

== Theology ==
Reformed Presbyterians believe that the supreme standard for faith and practice is the Bible, received as the inspired and inerrant Word of God. Reformed Presbyterians also follow the Westminster Confession of Faith and the Larger and Shorter Catechisms.

Reformed Presbyterian churches describe their theology as apostolic, Protestant, Reformed (or Calvinistic), and evangelical. Members of the communion follow a historical-grammatical interpretation of the Bible, which is reflected in many of their stances on moral issues such as abortion, homosexuality, and gambling laws. Reformed Presbyterians place particular emphasis on the kingship of Christ. Specifically, they believe that the state is under obligation, once admitted but now repudiated, to recognise Jesus Christ as its king and to govern all its affairs in accordance with God's will. Words from Colossians 1:18 express the core of Covenanter theology: "that in everything he [Christ] might be preeminent."

The communion adheres to the regulative principle of worship, which holds that worship must consist only of elements affirmatively found in Scripture, or implied logically by good and necessary consequence. In keeping with their view of the regulative principle, Reformed Presbyterian churches only sing Psalms during service (a practice known as exclusive psalmody), unaccompanied by instruments and to the exclusion of hymns, as they believe this is the only form of congregational singing evidenced in and therefore permitted by the Bible.

== History ==
Reformed Presbyterians have been referred to historically as "Covenanters" because of their identification with public covenanting in Scotland, beginning in the 16th century. In response to Charles I of England's attempts to change the liturgy and form of government in the churches, which the free assemblies and the English Parliament had previously agreed upon, a number of ministers affirmed those previous agreements by signing the "National Covenant" of February 1638 at Greyfriars Kirk in Edinburgh. Many signed in their own blood. Their cause is reflected in the Blue Banner associated with Reformed Presbyterianism; it proclaims "For Christ's Crown and Covenant," as the Covenanters saw the King’s attempt to revise the liturgy and government of the Church as an attempt to claim its headship from Christ.

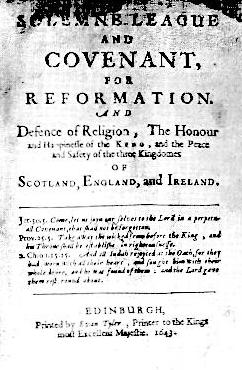
Title page of the Solemn League and Covenant.

During the First English Civil War (1642–1646), English Parliamentarians defying Charles I and his supporters, the Cavaliers, feared that Charles would secure the support and intervention of the Roman Catholic Confederate Ireland, as the latter in turn feared invasion by the Parliamentarians. The Parliamentarians sought the aid of the Scots, with whom they negotiated a treaty, called the "Solemn League and Covenant." This covenant obligated the Parliamentarians to reform the Church of England "according to the Word of God, and the example of the best reformed Churches"—i.e., to reform the Church of England along Presbyterian lines. In exchange, the Covenanters agreed to support the Parliamentarians against Charles I and the Cavaliers in the Civil War. The Solemn League and Covenant also asserted the "crown rights" of Christ as king over both Church and state, and the Church's right to freedom from coercive state interference.

The majority of the English Long Parliament were amenable to these terms; many MPs were Presbyterians, while others preferred allying with the Scots to losing the Civil War. On 17 August 1643, the Church of Scotland (the Kirk) accepted it and on 25 September 1643 so did the English Parliament and the Westminster Assembly. Pursuant to the Solemn League and Covenant, the Westminster Assembly drew up the Westminster Standards, including the influential Westminster Confession of Faith, to define and implement Reformed standards of doctrine in the Church of England.

The Parliamentarians defeated Charles in June of 1646. A brief Second Civil War from February to August of 1648 ended with Charles' defeat, trial, and execution. In the period of the Commonwealth (1649–1660) that followed the Civil Wars, Oliver Cromwell put Independents in power in England, signalling the end of the reforms promised by the Parliament. When the Stuart monarchy was restored in 1660, some Presbyterians were hopeful; the new king, Charles II, had sworn to the covenants in the Treaty of Breda (1650), in exchange for the Covenanters' aid in restoring him to the throne. These hopes were quickly dashed, and the Covenant repudiated. Likewise, the Westminster Standards were revoked as standards for the Church of England. Soon after the Restoration, Parliament (the so-called "Cavalier Parliament" of 1661–1679) passed the Sedition Act 1661, declaring that the Solemn League and Covenant was unlawful, and that anyone who asserted that that Covenant continued to impose obligations on any person would be liable to a charge of praemunire.

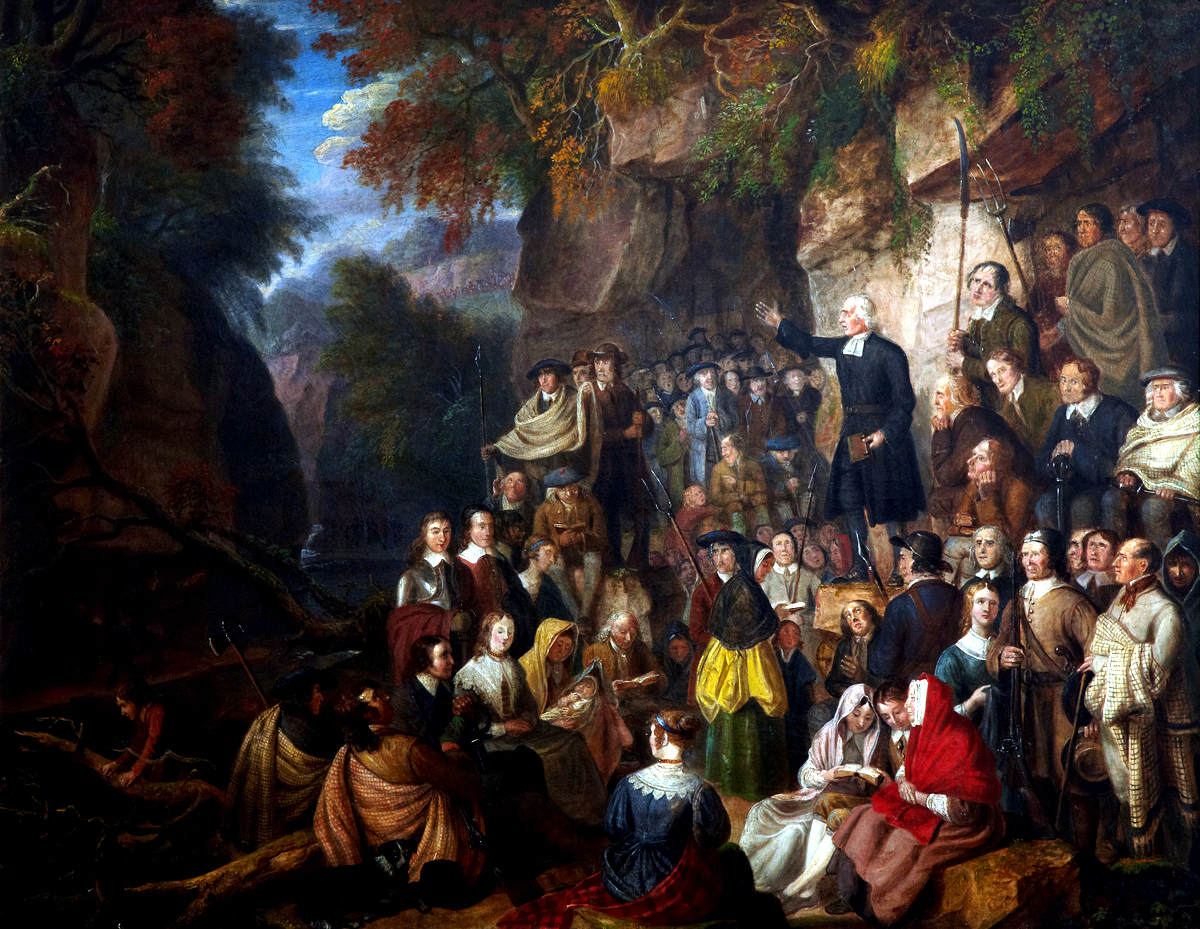
Covenanters in a Glen by Alexander Carse; an illegal field assembly or Conventicle.

While the majority of the population participated in the established Church following the Restoration, the Covenanters refused to conform, instead holding worship services called conventicles in the countryside. The conventicles were proscribed by the Conventicle Act 1664 and the Conventicles Act 1670. Nevertheless, the Covenanters continued to assemble and preach at conventicles, and suffered greatly from persecution during the reigns of Charles II and James VII. The height of the persecution, from roughly 1679 to the Glorious Revolution of 1688, has subsequently become known as the Killing Time. Between 1660 and 1690, tens of thousands of Scottish Covenanters fled persecution to the Irish province of Ulster, where they eventually formed the Reformed Presbyterian Church of Ireland.

The Church of Scotland was re-established along wholly Presbyterian lines in 1691, three years after the Glorious Revolution, and the great majority Covenanters and Covenanter ministers were readmitted. A dissenting minority, however refused to re-enter the Kirk of this "Revolution Settlement." They objected that the settlement was forced upon the Church and did not adhere to the previously-agreed Solemn League and Covenant, insofar as the state continued not to acknowledge the kingship of Christ. These dissenters formed into "United Societies" which eventually constituted the Reformed Presbyterian Church in Scotland.

Because Covenanter ministers re-joined the established Church after the Revolution Settlement, the United Societies were without any ministers for sixteen years, until 1706. For those sixteen years, the Dissenting Covenanters maintained their Societies for worship and religious correspondence. There were about twenty such Societies, with a general membership of about seven thousand. In 1706, Rev. John M'Millan (or McMillan) (c. 1669–1753), previously a minister of the established Church of Scotland in the parish of Balmaghie, was offered, and accepted, the officer of minister to the Dissenting Societies. M'Millan had been deposed from the established Church for persistent "protestation against all the corruptions, defections, errors, and mismanagements in the Church government of Scotland, as then established." He had also condemned the oath of allegiance to Queen Anne (r. 1702–1714), cousin and successor to William III. In 1743, another minister, Rev. Thomas Nairn (c. 1680–1764), who had left the established Church and joined the Associate Presbytery, came over to the Societies, which were then constituted the Reformed Presbytery.

The Reformed Presbytery increased in numbers, and in 1810 it was divided into three bodies—the Eastern, Northern, and Southern Presbyteries—which met the following year as the first Synod of the Reformed Presbyterian Church of Scotland. In that same year, the Irish and North American Reformed Presbyterian churches, daughters of the Scottish church, each formed their first synod. Since then, the Australian, Cypriot, Filipino, and South Sudanese Reformed Presbyterian churches have been established.

== Members ==
The Reformed Presbyterian churches are a communion. All churches in the communion descend from the Reformed Presbyterian Church of Scotland. The member churches of the communion are:

Country	Denomination	Number of congregations	Number of members	Year
Australia	Reformed Presbyterian Church of Australia	3	260	2021
United States of America	Reformed Presbyterian Church of North America	107	7,581	2021
Ireland	Reformed Presbyterian Church of Ireland	41	2,065	2022
United Kingdom	Reformed Presbyterian Church of Scotland	5	250	2022
World	Reformed Presbyterian Global Alliance	156	10,156	2021-2022

== See also ==
- Presbyterianism
- Calvinism
- Cameronians
- Covenanters
- Solemn League and Covenant
- Free Presbyterian Church of Scotland
- Free Church of Scotland (Continuing)
