= List of listed buildings in Kirkcaldy And Dysart, Fife =

This is a list of listed buildings in the parish of Kirkcaldy and Dysart in Fife, Scotland.

== List ==
Name	Location	Date listed	Grid ref. (Note: Sometimes known as OSGB36, the grid reference (where provided) is based on the British national grid reference system used by the Ordnance Survey. • "Guide to National Grid". Ordnance Survey. • "Get-a-map". Ordnance Survey.)	Geo-coordinates	Notes	LB number (Note: Historic Environment Scotland assign a unique alphanumeric identifier to each designated site in Scotland, for listed buildings this always begins with "LB", for example "LB12345".)	Image
Shawsmill Bridge				56°07′26″N 3°14′54″W	Category C(S)	45463	Upload Photo
Thornton, Strathore Road, Clinic And Library Including Boundary Walls				56°09′53″N 3°08′49″W	Category C(S)	45465	Upload Photo
Balbeggie Cottage With Outbuildings And Gatepiers				56°09′09″N 3°09′04″W	Category C(S)	45453	Upload Photo
Chapel Home Farm				56°08′08″N 3°12′43″W	Category C(S)	45457	Upload Photo
Thornton, Strathore Road, Mid Strathore Farmhouse				56°09′58″N 3°09′34″W	Category C(S)	45466	Upload Photo
Off Wester Bogie Road, North Lodge Gates				56°07′19″N 3°11′55″W	Category C(S)	45458	Upload Photo
Dysart, Frances Colliery, Headframe And Winding Engine House Including Associated Fixtures And Fittings				56°07′58″N 3°06′43″W	Category B	13638	Upload Photo
Raith Estate, Raith House				56°06′46″N 3°11′51″W	Category A	9681	Upload Photo
Raith Estate, Stable Court (Home Farm)				56°06′49″N 3°11′58″W	Category A	9682	Upload Photo
Thornton, Strathore House Including Boundary Walls And Gates				56°10′12″N 3°11′38″W	Category B	45464	Upload Photo
Balwearie Cottage Flint Mill, Kiln, Mill Lade And Bridge				56°05′54″N 3°11′02″W	Category B	45454	Upload Photo
Raith Estate, Raith Tower, Cormie Hill				56°06′50″N 3°12′30″W	Category B	9688	Upload another image
Thornton, Strathore Road, Redford With Boundary Walls				56°09′41″N 3°11′12″W	Category C(S)	45467	Upload Photo
Balwearie Tower				56°05′56″N 3°11′11″W	Category B	45456	Upload Photo
Raith Estate, Bankhead Of Raith Farmhouse With Walled Garden And Steading				56°07′16″N 3°13′55″W	Category B	45459	Upload Photo
Balwearie Farmhouse With Boundary Walls				56°06′02″N 3°12′13″W	Category C(S)	45455	Upload Photo
Raith Estate, Lambswell				56°06′57″N 3°13′54″W	Category B	45461	Upload Photo
Wester Balbeggie Farmhouse With Boundary Walls				56°09′17″N 3°10′21″W	Category C(S)	45468	Upload Photo
Wester Bogie Farmhouse				56°07′37″N 3°12′39″W	Category C(S)	45469	Upload Photo
Torbain Tower				56°07′25″N 3°13′08″W	Category B	9689	Upload another image
Raith Estate, Laundry House				56°06′45″N 3°12′02″W	Category C(S)	45460	Upload Photo
Raith Estate, Secular Burial Ground				56°06′40″N 3°11′08″W	Category B	45462	Upload Photo
Raith Estate, Ice House				56°06′47″N 3°11′58″W	Category B	9683	Upload Photo
Phase I Block, Victoria Hospital, excluding all later additions and other buildings on the hospital site, except for the Phase II Block (Tower and Podium) to the south (LB52537), Hayfield Road, Kirkcaldy				56°07′32″N 3°09′35″W	Category C(S)	52536	Upload Photo

== Key ==
The scheme for classifying buildings in Scotland is:

- Category A: "buildings of national or international importance, either architectural or historic; or fine, little-altered examples of some particular period, style or building type."
- Category B: "buildings of regional or more than local importance; or major examples of some particular period, style or building type, which may have been altered."
- Category C: "buildings of local importance; lesser examples of any period, style, or building type, as originally constructed or moderately altered; and simple traditional buildings which group well with other listed buildings."

In March 2016 there were 47,288 listed buildings in Scotland. Of these, 8% were Category A, and 50% were Category B, with the remaining 42% being Category C.

== See also ==
- List of listed buildings in Fife
