= Thomas Nairn =

Controversial Scottish Presbyterian minister

Personal details
- Born: c1680
- Died: February 1764
- Denomination: (1) Church of Scotland (2) Associate Presbytery/ Secession Church (3) Reformed Presbytery (4) Church of Scotland

Thomas Nairn (c. 1680 - February 1764) was a controversial Scottish Presbyterian minister. Although he served in several Presbyterian denominations perhaps his most important contribution to church history was his role in setting up the organisation which eventually became the Reformed Presbyterian Church.

Although his stay with the Reformed Presbyterians was relatively short, he was acknowledged, by right of his valid ordination, to have the authority, along with John M'Millan, to form a legitimate presbytery and in so doing to be able to ordain others to the offices of the church. Before Nairn's arrival M'Millan had for more than 36 years been the only minister in what was essentially a small denomination known as the United Societies. Nairn had previously been a minister in the Associate Presbytery of the First Seceders, although he started and ended his days in the Church of Scotland.

== Biographical data ==
Thomas Nairn (sometime spelled Nairne) was born about 1680. He was the son of Samuel Nairn, minister of Errol. Thomas was educated at St Andrews University, graduating with an M.A. on 19 July 1702. He was licensed by the Presbytery of Cupar on 27 September 1708 and called 26 June, and ordained to Abbotshall, Kirkcaldy on 7 September 1710.

Nairn left the Church of Scotland and joined the Associate Presbytery of the First Seceders on 12 October 1737. He was deposed by the Church of Scotland General Assembly on 15 May 1740.

He disagreed with his Associate brethren on "an Act for renewing our Covenants," and he seceded from the Seceders on 3 February 1743.

Along with Rev. John M'Millan, formerly of Balmaghie, he founded the Reformed Presbytery on 1 August 1743.

He then decided to return to the Church of Scotland. He petitioned the Church of Scotland General Assembly to be again received into the Established Church, acknowledging his error, and was first, after discipline, admitted as a member, and afterwards restored to the ministry on 5 June 1758.

Thomas Nairn died in February 1764.

== Time with the Seceders ==
In 1737 the Rev. Thomas Nairn of Abbotshall, the parish which adjoins that of Kirkcaldy, and part of which is within the town, along with a number of his parishioners, seceded from the Established Church, and joined the Associate Presbytery. After their accession it was deemed inexpedient to continue supply of sermon to the Seceders in Kirkcaldy as a separate congregation from that of Abbotshall. They were not, however, willing at first to be identified with it. They adhered to Nairn's ministry, but as a congregation distinct from his, waiting to obtain a minister of their own, and expecting that the Presbytery before long would be able to afford them one. That, however, had become doubtful, both from the small supply of preachers at the Presbytery's command, and their desire to strengthen the position of Nairn, who had now become one of themselves. In July 1741 the people in secession in and about Kirkcaldy petitioned the Presbytery to form a pastoral relation between them and the Rev. Nairn, and unite the two congregations in a public and formal manner. The consideration of this petition was delayed, and not resumed till the beginning of July 1742, when its prayer was complied with. The Rev. Mr Thomson of Burntisland, who had seceded from the Established Church about the same time with Nairn, was appointed by the Presbytery to preach at Abbotshall on Monday the 19th of July, and "after sermon to read both papers of coalescence - the one from the parish of Abbotshall and the other from the parish of Kirkcaldy, and an adherence thereto be required of the people, and their silence taken for consent; and that the Rev. Nairn make intimation of the said meeting from the pulpit next Lord's Day." These appointments were fully carried out, and the Seceders in Kirkcaldy and Abbotshall thus became one congregation.

Nairn had been minister of the United Congregations only about a year, when a proposal was made by the Associate Presbytery (which met in Edinburgh October 1742) to renew the Covenants, and a draft of the agreement was then ordered to be drawn up. When that draft was read to the Presbytery, Nairn offered to dissent from the following clauses which it contained: —

 "We desire to be humbled for the dangerous extreme that some have gone into, of impugning the present civil authority over these nations, and subjection thereunto in lawful commands, on account of the want of those qualifications which magistrates ought to have according to the word of God and our covenants And that some few carry their zeal against the defections and evils of the times to the dangerous extreme of espousing principles in favour of propagating religion by oftensive arms, quite contrary to that disposition which ought to be in all the professed followers of Christ, who came not to destroy men's lives but to save them." 

Before accepting Nairn’s disagreement, the Presbytery prevailed on him to delay the step till the next meeting. At the next meeting at Stirling, on the 22 December, he again gave in his reasons of dissent from the paragraph in question, which were received, but nothing was done till 3 February 1743, when the Presbytery agreed to withdraw the paragraph from their Act. They, however, told Nairn that, unless he withdrew his dissent, the Presbytery would hold him homologating the sentiments they repudiated, and would proceed against him according to the rules of the Church. Nairn, in spite of this warning, refused to retract, and a committee was appointed to deal with him. Immediately upon this appointment being made, Nairn handed in a paper, entitled "Protest, Secession, and Appeal," and withdrew. When about to retire, the moderator, by appointment of Presbytery, cited him apud acta to compear before the Presbytery, in the house of the Rev. Adam Gib, next day at ten o'clock, but he did not comply. A committee was sent to Kirkcaldy to expedite matters, but without effect. He was summoned by the Anti-burgher Synod in November 1747, and appeared before that Court in January 1748, and boldly denied that subjection to the civil government was lawful; and at a subsequent meeting he was deposed. Few of his people took part with him in his second secession, but those who did so built a small place of worship for him at a short distance from the one from which he and they had withdrawn. Shortly after Nairn's second secession, he formed a connection with the Rev. Mr M'Millan of Balmaclellan, and with him became joint founder of the Reformed Presbytery. The congregation at Abbotshall, from which he had withdrawn, did not, however, consider their connection with Nairn properly dissolved until the Synod declared it to be so by a public deed.

== Time with the Old Dissenters ==
After the Revolution, the Scottish Covenanters had broken from the Presbyterian church and named themselves the 'United Societies', with over 6,000 members. By 1689, the United Societies lost all three of their ministers as they had joined the reconstituted Church of Scotland. For many years the Societies continued to worship in what was, in practical purposes, a small denomination with no ministers. In 1706 John M'Millan joined the United Societies. However, being a single ordained minister, he lacked the authority to ordain other men to the ministry. For 37 years, he was the only man who the Societies would allow to baptise members or administer the Lord's Supper. An attempt made to induce Ebenezer Erskine to join with the United Societies when he seceded from the Established Church in 1733; however, this was not successful.

On 1 August 1743, Nairn joined the Associate Presbytery, came over to the Societies, which were then constituted as the Reformed Presbytery. The Presbytery was constituted at Braehead, Carnwath, and ordained new ministers, one of whom, John Cuthbertson, was despatched to support the cause in Pennsylvania.

The Seceders did not consider their connection with Nairn ended by these proceedings, and in November 1747 he was served with a libel. The case dragged on till February 1750, when he was formally excommunicated.

Nairn’s subsequent connection with the Reformed Presbyterian Church is obscure owing to the absence of the records. He was sent on at least one mission to the adherents of the Church in Ireland. He appears to have left the Presbytery soon after joining it. He was brought under its censure, it is understood, because of some ecclesiastical misdemeanour. He left his new connection some time after, and again returned to the Established Church.

== Family ==
He married, and had four daughters - Ann; Margaret (married John Cunningham of Pittarthy); Helen; Mary (married 8 June 1752, James Meldrum, writer, Kirkcaldy)

== Publication ==
- A Sermon preached at Braehead (Glasgow, 1745)

== Bibliography ==
- Gib's Display
- Hutchison's Reformed Presbyterian Church in Scotland, 184-203
