= List of listed buildings in Balmaghie, Dumfries and Galloway =

This is a list of listed buildings in the parish of Balmaghie, Dumfries and Galloway, Scotland.

== List ==
Name	Location	Date Listed	Grid Ref. (Note: Sometimes known as OSGB36, the grid reference (where provided) is based on the British national grid reference system used by the Ordnance Survey. • "Guide to National Grid". Ordnance Survey. • "Get-a-map". Ordnance Survey.)	Geo-coordinates	Notes	LB Number (Note: Historic Environment Scotland assign a unique alphanumeric identifier to each designated site in Scotland, for listed buildings this always begins with "LB", for example "LB12345".)	Image
Hensol Lodge And Gates				55°00′26″N 4°05′25″W	Category B	3417	Upload Photo
Glentoo Farmhouse And Horsemill With Steading				54°56′10″N 4°01′17″W	Category B	3423	Upload Photo
Laurieston, Crockett Memorial				54°57′44″N 4°03′32″W	Category C(S)	3426	Upload Photo
Laurieston, Windhover And Lilac Grove				54°57′40″N 4°03′35″W	Category C(S)	3427	Upload Photo
Laurieston Hall Stables				54°58′07″N 4°04′04″W	Category B	3424	Upload Photo
Laurieston, Chestnut House				54°57′39″N 4°03′35″W	Category B	3425	Upload Photo
Gordon Chapel, Quarter Mile West Of Glenlochar Bridge				54°57′28″N 3°59′27″W	Category B	3414	Upload Photo
Laurieston Hall				54°58′07″N 4°04′11″W	Category B	3418	Upload Photo
Little Duchrae, Cottage And Farm Steading				54°59′51″N 4°05′07″W	Category C(S)	3428	Upload Photo
Threave Castle				54°56′21″N 3°58′11″W	Category A	3408	Upload another image
Hensol House				55°00′19″N 4°04′20″W	Category A	3415	Upload another image
Hensol House, The Lainshaw Sundial				55°00′19″N 4°04′19″W	Category A	3416	Upload Photo
Balmaghie Parish Church And Churchyard, Church Of Scotland				54°58′30″N 3°59′49″W	Category B	3422	Upload another image See more images
Livingston				54°59′13″N 4°00′37″W	Category B	3407	Upload Photo

== Key ==
The scheme for classifying buildings in Scotland is:

- Category A: "buildings of national or international importance, either architectural or historic; or fine, little-altered examples of some particular period, style or building type."
- Category B: "buildings of regional or more than local importance; or major examples of some particular period, style or building type, which may have been altered."
- Category C: "buildings of local importance; lesser examples of any period, style, or building type, as originally constructed or moderately altered; and simple traditional buildings which group well with other listed buildings."

In March 2016 there were 47,288 listed buildings in Scotland. Of these, 8% were Category A, and 50% were Category B, with the remaining 42% being Category C.
