= Wendy Scott =

British Münchausen syndrome patient (1948–1999)

Wendy Scott (1948, Wemyss, Scotland – 14 October 1999, London) was considered one of the most notable cases of Münchausen syndrome on record, in part because of the severity of her condition and in part because she was a rare case of complete recovery from the syndrome, which many doctors consider untreatable.

Scott compulsively sought medical care for stomach aches that she did not experience. She found people cared for her at the hospital, and returned seeking that care. If she was discharged or kicked out, she would move to a different hospital, travelling as much as 300 miles across the UK or visiting Europe to be hospitalised. She had 42 needless operations and was admitted 600 times during a 12 year span.

Twice she was jailed for illegally obtaining drugs, board and lodgings. She had been sectioned several times before finally being diagnosed with Munchausen's syndrome. It was a relief to Scott when she could finally name her diagnosis and find others who also struggled with it.

In 1982 Scott founded the Munchausen Syndrome Self-Help Group in London. In 1993 there were around five regular members. They were based across the UK, and communicated through letters and phone calls.

In 1997 Scott began to experience stomach pains, but found no medical providers in London would see her due to her past history. It wasn't until she was taken ill on a holiday in America that she was diagnosed with advanced intestinal cancer. She died aged 50 on 14 October 1999.
