= Treaty of Breda (1650) =

1650 treaty between Charles II and Scottish Covenanters

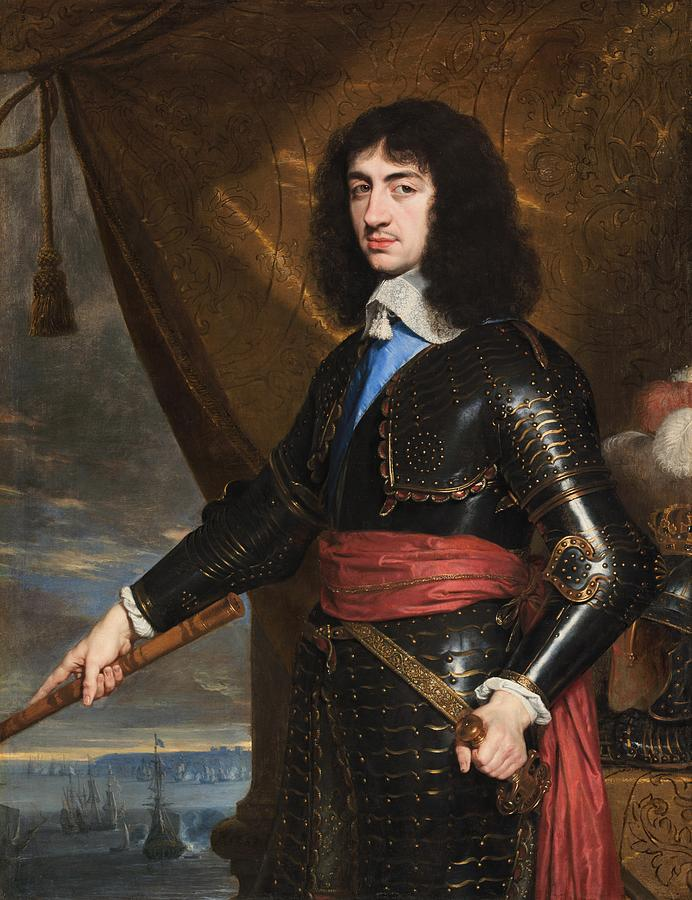
- Charles II of England, c. 1653
- Signed: 1 May 1650
- Location: Breda, Dutch Republic
- Parties: Charles II; Kingdom of Scotland
- Language: English

The Treaty of Breda (1650) was signed on 1 May 1650 between Charles II, exiled king of England, Scotland and Ireland, and the Scottish Covenanter government. Under its terms, they agreed to install Charles II as King of England as well as Scotland, while Charles undertook to establish a Presbyterian form for the Church of England, and guarantee the rights of the Church of Scotland.

The Scots had previously allied with English Royalists to restore Charles I to the throne in the 1648 Second English Civil War. Following their defeat, Charles was executed in January 1649, leading to the establishment of the Commonwealth of England. For various reasons, the Scots objected to the execution, and the Treaty of Breda led to the Anglo-Scottish war (1650–1652). This time, defeat meant Scotland was incorporated into the Commonwealth.

Although Scotland regained its independence after the 1660 Stuart Restoration, his experience of the alliance meant Charles II remained hostile to Presbyterianism throughout his reign, and restored bishops to the Church of Scotland in 1662.

== Background ==
Victory in the 1639 and 1640 Bishops' Wars confirmed Covenanter control of Scotland, and established a Presbyterian-structured Church of Scotland, or "kirk". Thereafter, their main political objective was to preserve this achievement, and one way of doing so was to support their English allies in creating a closely-aligned Church of England. This required the Royalists to be defeated in the First English Civil War, and led to the 1643 Solemn League and Covenant. Under its terms, the Parliament of England agreed to "preserve" a Presbyterian kirk and "reform" the Church of England in accordance with "best practice", in return for Scottish military support.

However, the pact had limited support in England, particularly from religious Independents like Oliver Cromwell, who opposed any state religion, especially one so highly regulated as the kirk. Disproportionately well-represented in the New Model Army, by 1646 the Scots and their English allies viewed them as more dangerous than their Royalist opponents. In May 1646, Charles I tried to take advantage of these divisions by surrendering to the Scots at Newark-on-Trent, hoping they would give him better terms than Parliament.

His refusal to convert to Presbyterianism led to a stalemate between Charles and the Scots, who in 1647 handed him over to Parliament in exchange for £400,000.

However, they were excluded from negotiations by the victorious English Parliament and by 1647, they despaired of achieving their political goals – the establishment of Presbyterianism in the Three Kingdoms and asserting the civil authority of the Scots Parliament and the General Assembly of the Scottish Kirk (Presbyterian Church). They even suspected that the Parliamentarians would annex Scotland and impose their own "Independent" religious settlement. For this reason, one faction of the Covenanters, the Engagers, signed a secret deal with Charles I called the "Engagement". However, they were defeated in an attempted invasion of England and even came to blows with fellow Covenanters who wanted a more forthright deal with the King.

== Treaty ==
When Charles I was executed in 1649, the radical Covenanters, or "Kirk Party", moved to do a new deal with Charles II, the son of the dead King, who was in exile in Breda. The treaty basically granted everything the Kirk Party wanted. Charles II undertook to establish Presbyterianism as the national religion and to recognise the authority of the Kirk's General Assembly in civil law in England as it already was in Scotland. Charles also took the Solemn League and Covenant oath of 1643.

Charles was crowned King of Scots in Scone in January 1651, but by then the terms agreed at Breda were already a dead letter. The army associated with the Kirk Party under David Leslie was destroyed by Oliver Cromwell at the Battle of Dunbar in September 1650 and the English Parliamentarian New Model Army had taken Edinburgh and much of Lowland Scotland. Even a subsequent rapprochement between moderate and radical Covenanters and their former enemies, the Scottish Royalists, was not enough to restore Charles' throne. He fled the country for France after his defeat at the battle of Worcester in September 1651.

Under the Commonwealth of England, Scotland was annexed, its legislative institutions abolished and Presbyterianism dis-established. There was freedom of religion under the Commonwealth, except for Roman Catholics, but the edicts of the Kirk's assemblies were no longer enforced by law, as previously.

After being restored to his throne in 1660 King Charles completely reneged on the Treaty of Breda, seeking to restore an Episcopalian church structure in Scotland.

== Sources ==
- Davies, Godfrey; Hardacre, Paul (1962). "The Restoration of the Scottish Episcopacy, 1660-1661". Journal of British Studies. 1 (2): 32–51. doi:10.1086/385441. JSTOR 175201. S2CID 144583746.
- Hutton, Ronald (2021). The Making of Oliver Cromwell. Yale University Press. ISBN 978-0300257458.
- Royle, Trevor (2006) [2004]. Civil War: The Wars of the Three Kingdoms 1638–1660. Abacus. ISBN 978-0-349-11564-1.
