= John M'Millan =

Founder of the Reformed Presbyterian Church

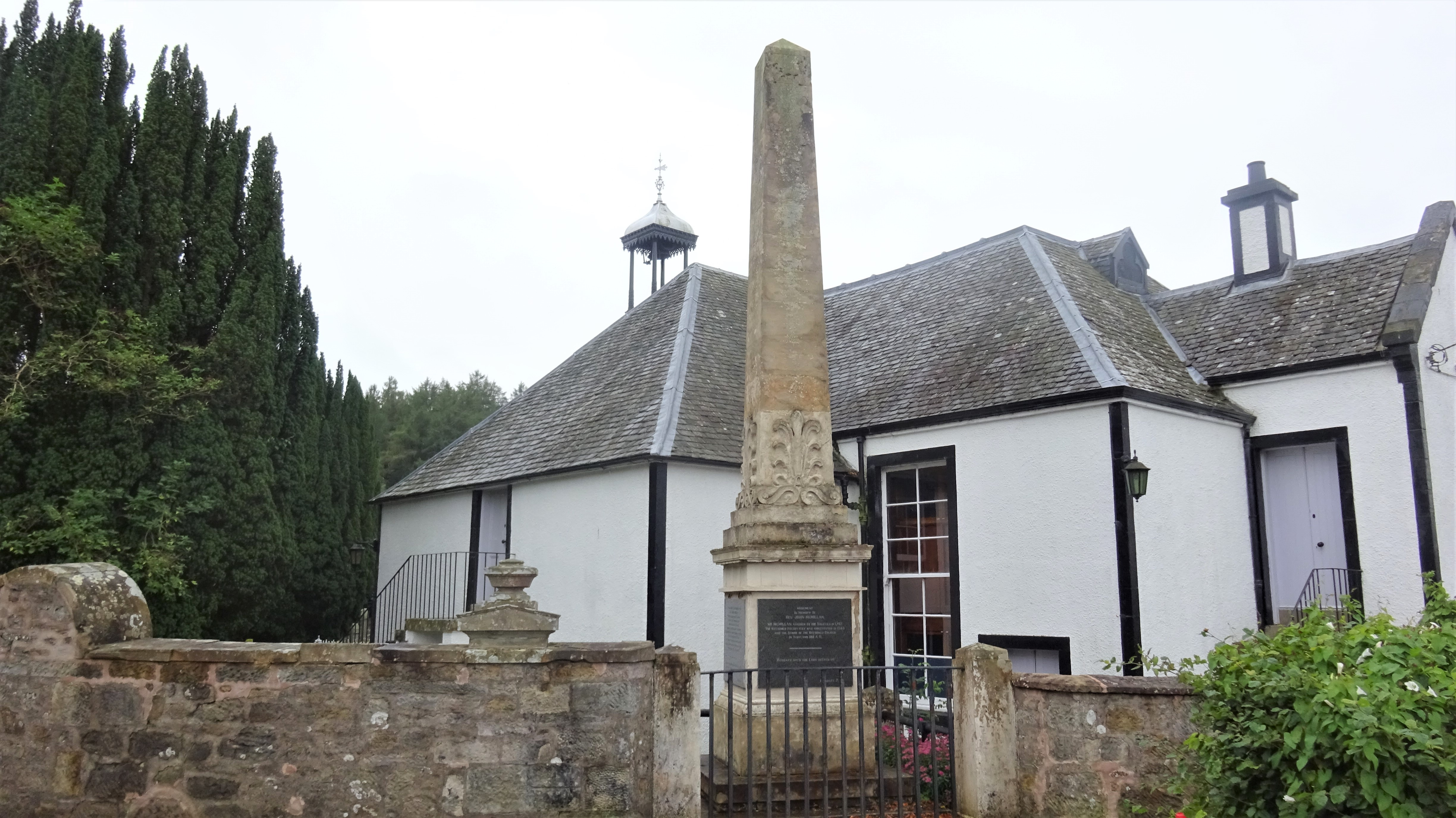
- Memorial obelisk to John M'Millan at Dalserf
- Church: Presbyterian

Orders
- Ordination: 19 September 1701

Personal details
- Born: various spellings M'Millan, Macmillan, McMillan c. 1669 Minnigaff
- Died: 1 December 1753 Broomhill, Bothwell
- Buried: Dalserf; 55.735°N 3.914°W
- Denomination: (1) Church of Scotland (2) United Societies (3) Reformed Presbytery
- Spouse: (1) Jean Gemble (2) Mary Gordon (3) Grace Russell
- Children: (1) Josias (2) Katherine (3) John (4) Grizel (5) Ann (6) Alexander Jonita
- Occupation: minister
- Education: Edinburgh University

John M'Millan was the founding Father of the Reformed Presbyterian Church. He was the first minister of the Cameronians after the Revolution Settlement. He was born at Minnigaff, near Newton Stewart in Kirkcudbrightshire, around 1669, and spent his boyhood near his birthplace. Before he began his ministerial career he was elected an elder of Girthon session. He attended Edinburgh University 1695-7, and graduated with an M.A. on 28 June 1697. He was licensed on 26 November 1700, spending part of his probation as tutor with the Laird of Broughton, 1700-1. He preached for the first time in Balmaghie Church on 22 December 1700, apparently as ordinary supply, and on 30 April 1701, was elected to the parish. The call was reported to the Presbytery on 24 June, and he was ordained on 19 September. The controversy regarding his ecclesiastical attitude lasted from October 1702 to 30 December 1703, when he was deposed. His name first appears in the minutes of the General Meeting of the Dissenters when they considered a letter from him, 5 April 1704. He conferred with its members on 31 January 1705, and 13 February 1706, and on 14 August 1706, submitted to them. The Societies called him on 9 October. The Covenants were renewed at Auchensaugh on 23–4 July 1712. M'Millan left the Balmaghie Manse in 1727, and during 1729-34 resided at different places in the parish of Carnwath, and at Braehead from 1734 to 1753. The Presbytery was erected at Braehead on 1 August 1743, and a disruption took place in it in April 1753. He died at Broomhill on 1 December 1753.

== Early life and Church of Scotland ministry ==
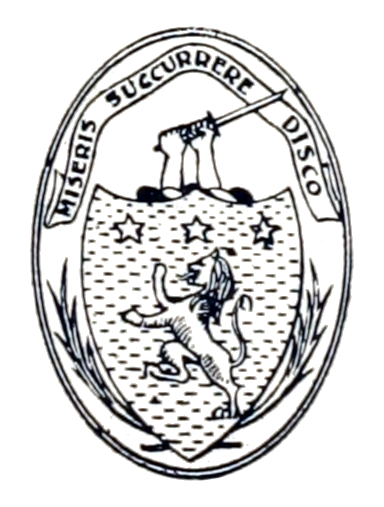
John M'Millan's seal

John M'Millan, founder of the Reformed Presbyterian Church, was the son of John M'Millan, who was descended from a branch of the family long settled at Arndarroch. John was born in 1669 at Barncauchlaw, a hill farm in the parish of Minnigaff, Kirkcudbrightshire. His father is said to have fallen at Bothwell Bridge, and his mother, whose name is unknown, married again. M'Millan was probably brought up at Earlston, in Dalry, where he attended the parish school, and met many of those who had suffered for their religious convictions. He studied at the University of Edinburgh, and graduated M.A. 28 June 1697. He was sometime chaplain to John Murray, the laird of Broughton [Cally, parish of Girthon]. He was licensed by the presbytery of Kirkcudbright on 26 November 1700. On 29 May he was called to Balmaghie, and ordained on Thursday, 18 September 1701. The training of his youth gave him a strong leaning to the side of the Cameronians, whose distinctive tenets were that no sworn allegiance was due to the king or government, on the ground that they had rescinded the Covenants and the Acts of the Reformation period. Soon after his settlement he began to air certain grievances in the Presbytery, and to make protests against the form of church government, especially the Oath of Allegiance to Queen Anne, who was suspect on the subject of Presbyterianism. His views of the binding force of the Covenants were even at this time akin to those of the "suffering remnant" of Cameronians.

== Deposed by the Church of Scotland ==
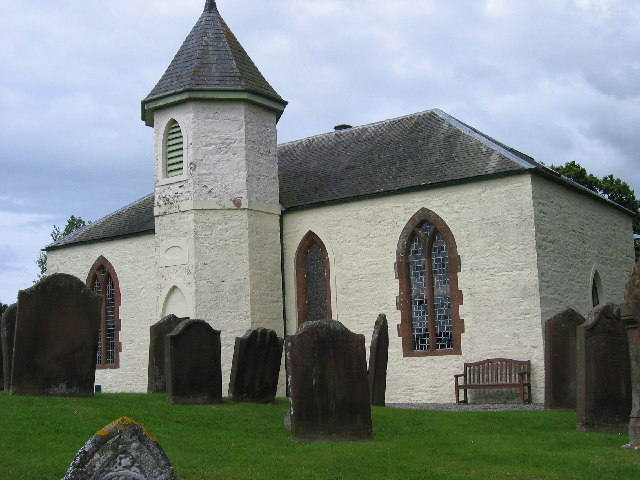
Balmaghie Church. Not much of the original building survives.

In the month of July, 1703, M'Millan, in concert with two other members of the Presbytery of Kirkcudbright, namely, Mr Reid of Carsephairn, and Mr Tod of Buittle, presented a paper to that ecclesiastical body containing a statement of grievances, and praying for redress; they then left the court. The Presbytery having taken it into their consideration, appointed the Rev. Messrs Warner, of Balmaclellan; Telfer, of Rerwick; Cameron, of Kirkcudbright; Boyd, of Dalry; Ewart, of Kells; and Monteith, of Borgue, to answer it. After the answer had been received and approved of by the Presbytery, the three ministers gave in a "protestation against all the corruptions, defections, errors, and mismanagements in the Church government of Scotland, as then established". They also condemned the oath of allegiance to Queen Anne. Some farther proceedings having taken place respecting Mr Macmillan, the Presbytery records thus proceed: "All which being considered, and the presbytery being desirous to be as condescending as they can, for peace-sake, do pass all bygone differences and misbehaviours of said John Macmillan, declaring that if he behave not orderly for the future, but shall be turbulent and divisive, that then all former things now passed from shall be revived and he censured for them, with such new offences as shall be found just." Mr M'Millan, still continuing in acts of insubordination, was served with a libel; but he declined the jurisdiction of the Presbytery" and appealed to the first free and lawfully constituted General Assembly of the Church." The Presbytery took Mr M'Millan's libel into consideration, and found nearly all the articles proved, or substantiated. The court then proceeded to depose him, which sentence was ratified by the Commission and General Assembly of the Church. At an early stage of his ministry he protested against "the corruptions, defections, and errors of the church government", and his relations with the presbytery grew more and more strained, until his brethren found themselves under the necessity of deposing him, 30 December 1703, for disorderly and schismatical practices. There being no question as to M'Millan's morals or orthodoxy, it is doubtful whether the Kirkcudbright presbytery was competent to depose him. The deposition certainly affected him little; his popularity enabled him to retain possession of both church and manse, and he continued in the exercise of his ministry. He appeared before the commission of assembly 9 June 1704, acknowledged a fault, and earnestly desired, but without success, to be "reponed". Two ministers, Mr Monteith, of Borgue, and Mr Hay, of Anwoth, were appointed to preach at Balmaghie, and declare the church vacant; but being denied admission by the populace into the sacred edifice, I Mr Monteith intimated the sentence of the Presbytery on the road, and declared the church of Balmaghie vacant. He next repaired to "the Place of Balmaghie" where he preached to such persons as were present, and again intimated the sentence of deposition. Mr M'Millan officiated that day in the church. The deposed clergyman still continued to perform all the duties of the ministry in the parish of Balmaghie, keeping possession of both church and manse. Mackenzie and Symson also give various extracts from the Presbytery records.

Records of the Presbytery of Kirkcudbright.) 22 February 1704, As to the affair of Balmaghie, Mr Monteith reports that he went towards the Kirk of Balmaghie, according to appointment, and James Gordon, Town Clerk, of Kirkcudbright, notary public, together with some witnesses, and that as be was riding towards the Kirk, there came from the kirkyard, about twenty or thirty men who refused to let him go farther, and actually stopped them, by laying hold on the foremost horse's bridle whereupon Mr Monteith finding he was violently withstood in going to the kirk, did take out his commission "from the presbytery, and read it to them, and did intimate the presbytery's sentence of deposition against Mr John Macmillan, and declared the kirk vacant; whereupon he asked and took instruments in the hands of the notary public, above mentioned."

== John M'Neil ==
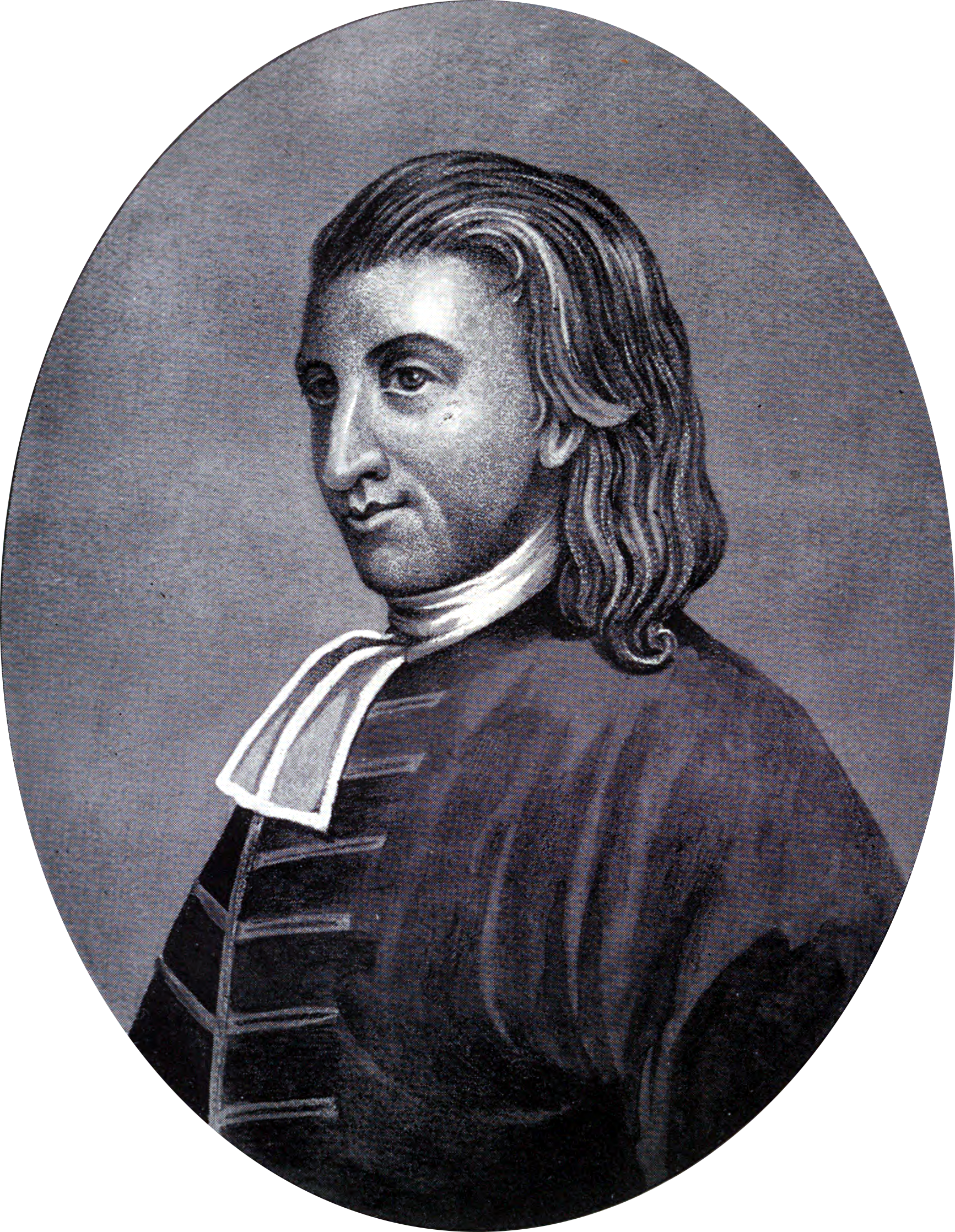
Thomas Boston who disliked Dissenters as he viewed them as schismatists.

Mr. John M'Neil joined with Mr. M'Millan around 1708. He was licensed as a probationer by the Church of Scotland Presbytery of Penpont on 10 May 1669 but was not ordained. He was in the fullest sympathy with M'Millan, and joined him in his "Protestation, Declinature, and Appeal", tabled before the Assembly 1708. The United Societies consistently refused to ordain him, no Presbytery having been constituted, and when he died, 10 December 1732, he had been a probationer for sixty-three years. John M'Neil married Beatrix Umpherston, who survived him, dying in her 91st year on 27 February 1763. M'Millan and the United Societies could not ordain their own ministers because in their own eyes they lacked the authority; they did not claim to be a separate church. Thomas Boston was very critical of what he called "the two preachers of the separation", being M'Millan and M'Neil. He preached a sermon in Ettrick on the subject of The Evil and Danger of Schism on 12 December 1708 which was aimed at what he saw to be their errors.

== Continued opposition to the deposition ==
On 12 October 1710, Mr William M'Kie, was ordained minister of Balmaghie. Notwithstanding this appointment, such was the spirit of the times and the powerlessness of the laws, that Mr Macmillan retained possession of the church, manse, and glebe, for about fifteen years after his deposition, though various attempts were made to remove him. So much were the people of the parish incensed at the proceedings against their beloved minister, that they violently attacked Mr M'Kie, and treated him with much inhumanity, wounding his person and tearing his clothes. Mr M'Millan, at last, voluntarily abandoned the church and left the parish. During all this time, the lawful incumbent officiated in a barn, or in the open air, to those who were disposed to attend his ministrations.

(Records of the Presbytery of Kirkcudbright.) 17 January 1710 "This day a protestation was presented by Hugh Mitchell, and others, protesting against the settlement of any other man to be minister in Balmaghie, except Mr John Macmillan, which protestation being read, they ordered the same to be kept in retentis, and appointed Mr Andrew Cameron to draw up answers and present them to the next presbytery. "A petition was also presented, [signed by 87 heads of families,] craving that Mr Macmillan might be reponed to the ministry at Balmaghie, which being read, they ordered the same to be kept in retentis, and appointed Mr Cameron to draw up an answer thereto.

While attending a funeral in 1711 M'Kie was assaulted by some supporters of M'Millan. Two years later, when M'Kie's friends went to plough the glebe for him, M'Millan's followers rose against them, as John Johnstone recorded in the Old Statistical account:

"When some of Mr M'Kie's adherents went to plough the glebe for his behoof, those of his competitor rose up against them, cut the reins in pieces, turned the horses adrift, and threw the ploughshare into the adjoining lake. Some threatened violence to the minister's person. An infuriated female actually attempted the execution of it, and would probably have effected her purpose, had he not interposed his hand between his throat and a reaping sickle with which she was armed. His fingers were cut to the bone. The glove which he wore was carefully preserved, as a memorial of the providential escape he had made. Another woman who was present, exclaimed, "Shed no blood", and her advice was followed. It was remarked by the country people, that the intending assassin never prospered afterward, and that by her own hand she terminated a life which she felt herself unable to endure."

Constant appeals were made by M'Kie's adherents to the lord-justice clerk and solicitor-general, but the civil government manifested a disinclination to interfere, and the disorders continued in Balmaghie until M'Millan voluntarily resigned in 1715.

== Old Dissenters ministry ==
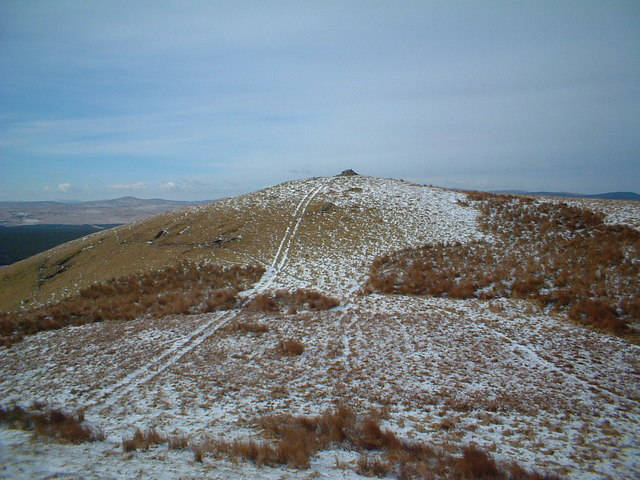
Auchensaugh Hill where the Covenants were renewed in 1712

Though retaining M'Kie's pulpit, M'Millan had since 1706 really acted as minister to "the Suffering Remnant of the true Presbyterian Church of Christ in Scotland," commonly known as the Cameronians, whose chief distinctive tenets were that no sworn allegiance was due to the monarch or government, on the ground that they had rescinded the covenants and the acts of the Reformation period. M'Millan's call by the remnant, which acquired and retained until 1743 the nickname of the "Macmillanites", was signed at Crawfordjohn in October 1706. M'Millan's accession was in fact of the utmost importance to the "United Societies". Their isolation originated in a movement of lay men and women who were dissatisfied with the Revolution settlement of Presbyterianism, at which the Covenants were ignored, and until 1706 they met only as fellowship "Societies". Since the death of James Renwick in 1688, and the defection of their three remaining ministers, Shields, Linning, and Boyd in 1689, they had waited and 'prayed patiently until the Lord should send them a pastor,' and M'Millan was the first ordained minister who associated himself with them. He now wandered far and near over almost the half of Scotland in the discharge of this wider ministry, spending also, as often as he could, his Sundays amongst his own faithful flock at Balmaghie. He was shortly joined by John M'Neil, a licentiate. M'Millan married Jean Gemble in 1708 but she died shortly afterwards in 1711. To confirm the faith of members and give a public testimony of their principles, the covenants were solemnly renewed on Auchensaugh Hill in Lanarkshire in 1712. Having finally thrown in his lot with the "Society people", M'Millan laboured among them with indefatigable zeal, traversing the country and gathering converts. An attempt made to induce the Covenanter Ebenezer Erskine to join M'Millan when he seceded from the Established Church in 1733 was not successful as the Seceders were not prepared to disown the existing Government. Nevertheless the Societies grew.

== Thomas Nairn ==
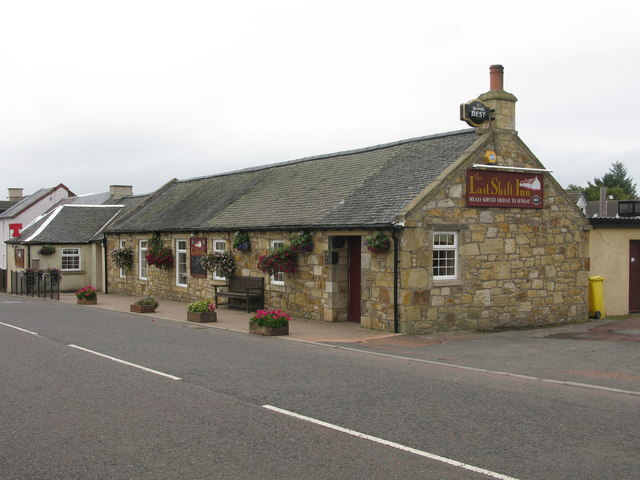
near Braehead, Carnwath where M'Millan and Nairn constituted the Reformed Presbytery

The ordination of William M'Kie, M'Millan's successor in the Church of Scotland, was effected (at Kirkcudbright) seven years after M'Millan's deposition. In 1714, however, a working agreement is said to have been made, under which M'Kie had the use of the church in M'Millan's absence. M'Millan voluntarily left the parish for good in 1727. In 1743 Macmillan was joined by Thomas Nairn, minister of Abbotshall, near Kirkcaldy in Fife. Whereunon they together erected a 'Reformed Presbytery' at Braehead, Carnwath, 1 August 1743, and ordained new ministers, one of whom, John Cuthbertson, was despatched to support the cause in Pennsylvania.

== Last days ==
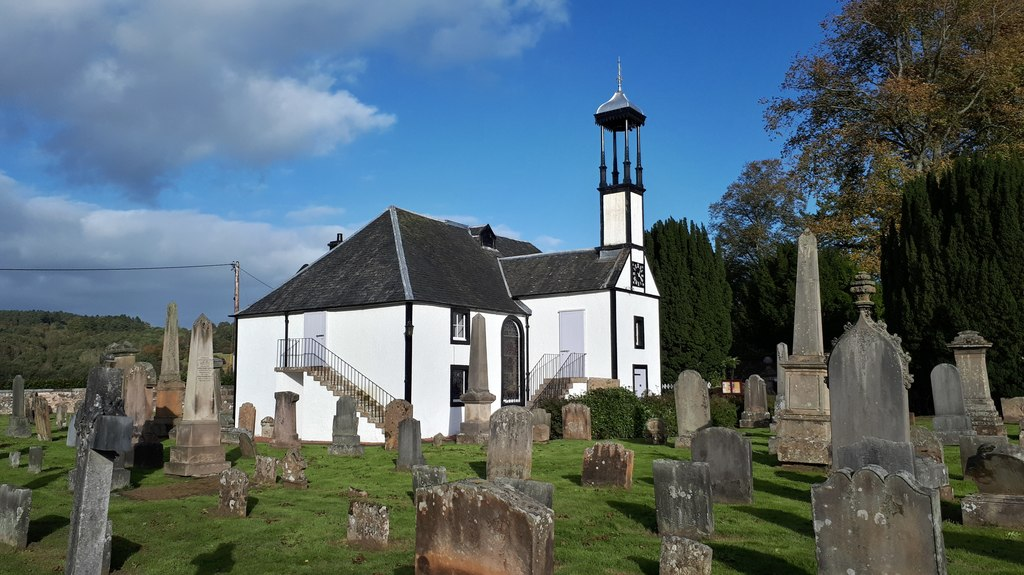
Dalserf Parish Church, where M'Millan has a monument and several of his family are buried.

There was a Breach in the Reformed Presbytery in 1753 following the publication of the book A Treatise on Justifying Faith by James Fraser of Brea, who had written it while a prisoner on the Bass Rock and who had died in 1699. The Amyraldian view of the atonement was commended by a number of ministers who for a while continued as groups of worshipers. Some set up their own dissentient Presbytery which eventually declined out of existence; others morphed, over many years, and became, in 1813, The Unitarian Church of Edinburgh. M'Millan died at Broomhill, Bothwell, on 1 December 1753, and was buried at Dalserf, where an imposing monument was erected in 1839. It has inscriptions on each of its four faces. In 1895 a memorial brass was placed in Balmaghie Church by his great-great-grandson, John Grieve, M.D., Glasgow.

== Family ==
flyleaf of M'Millan's family bible

M'Millan married:

- (1) 1708, Jean Gemble [Gemmell], probably belonging to Carsphairn, who died s.p. 12 June 1711
- (2) 1719, Mary (died in childbed, 5 May 1723, aged 43), daughter of Sir Alexander Gordon, Bart., of Earlston, and widow of Edward Goldie of Craigmuie [she left four children by her first marriage]
- (3) about 1725, Grace Russell [according to another account, Janet Jackson], who survived him, and had issue —
  - Josias, born 12 June 1726, died 1740;
  - Katherine, born 19 Dec. 1727, died 1738;
  - John, minister of the Reformed Presbyterian Church, Sandhills, Glasgow, born 1729, died 11 Feb. 1808;
  - Grizel, born 1731 (married (1) Andrew Galloway, Sandhills; (2) John Thorburn, minister of the Reformed Presbyterian Church, Pentland), died 1767;
  - Ann, born 1732 (married 31 Jan. 1751, John, son of James M'Crone, writer, Dalmellington);
  - Alexander Jonita, born 28 May 1734, died that year.

== Publications ==
- A True Narrative of the Proceedings of the Presbytery of Kirkcudbright against one of their member; and that to the sentence of deposition; to which is added the Grievances (anon.; 1704).
- A True Double of a Paper of Grievances given into the Presbytery of Kirkcudbright, 6 July 1703, by Mr John Reid, Minister of Carsphairn; Mr William Tod, Minister of Buittle; and Mr John Macmillan, Minister of Balmaghie; to which generally the whole fore-mentioned parishes adhere, and the greatest part of the Godly in the Land (appended to the True Narrative, 1704). The Pamphlet entitled a True Narrative of the Proceedings of the Presbytery of Kirkcudbright, etc., Examined, and Found False . . . by a Member of that Presbytery (Edinburgh, 1705)
- The Protestation, Declinature, and Appeal of Mr John Macmillan (n.p., 1708)
- A Letter from a Friend (n.p., n.d.) [vide Reply to a Pamphlet entitled, A Letter from a Friend (n.p., 1710)]
- A Short Survey of a Friendly Conference betioixt a Country-man and his Nephew (n.p., 1712)
- An Elegy upon the much lamented Death of that Religious and Virtuous Gentlewoman, Mrs Mary Gordon . . . spouse . . . to the Reverend Mr John M'Millan, Minister of the Gospel at Balmaghie (16 pp.; Edinburgh, 1723)

== Bibliography ==
- Catalogue Edin. Graduates, 1858, p. 156
- Minutes of Presbytery of Kirkcudbright, 20 August 1700 – 1 October 1717
- Observations on a Wolf in a Sheep's Skin [by Charles Umpherson], 1753, where M'Millan's death is described, pp. 39 – 46
- J. H. Thomson, R.P. Magazine, 1869 and 1870
- Acts of Ass., 1704–27
- Scots Mag., xv.
- "John Macmillan of Balmaghie, Additional Notes" (The Gallovidian, 1914)
