= Balmaghie =

Coordinates: 54.975°N 3.998°W

Balmaghie: Scottish Gaelic: Baile Mhic Aoidh
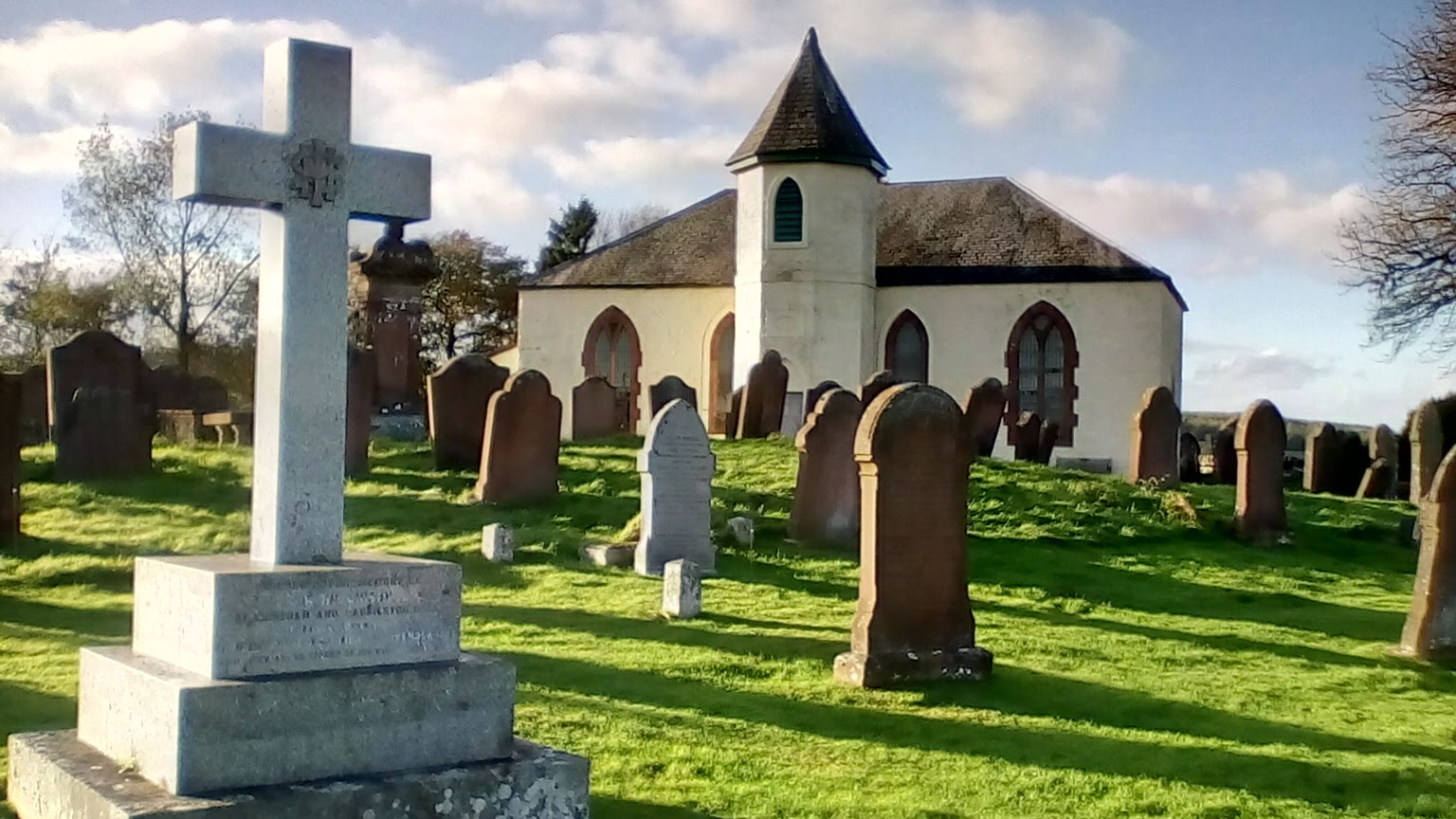
- Balmaghie Parish Church

- Location within Dumfries and Galloway
- Language: English; Scots; Scottish Gaelic
- Council area: Dumfries and Galloway
- Country: Scotland
- Sovereign state: United Kingdom
- Police: Scotland
- Fire: Scottish
- Ambulance: Scottish

Balmaghie (/bælməˈɡiː/ bal-mə-GEE), from the Scottish Gaelic Baile Mhic Aoidh, is an ecclesiastical and civil parish in the historical county of Kirkcudbrightshire in Dumfries and Galloway, Scotland and was the seat of the McGhee family. It is bordered by the River Dee to the north and east. Threave Castle stands on an island in the river. The River Dee is commonly known as the Black Water of Dee on the northern border, the name changes with the meeting of the Water of Ken to the north west and is then known as Loch Ken along the eastern border. Balmaghie parish borders Girthon to the west and Tongland and Twynholm to the south. The closest market town is Castle Douglas, about 6 miles from Balmaghie Kirk.

The ecclesiastical parish covers the same area as the civil parish and the two are generally not differentiated between.

Balmaghie parish is mainly rural and contains only a handful of small settlements: Laurieston, Bridge of Dee, and Glenlochar as well as number of farms and houses scattered throughout the parish. Farming is the major industry of the area, although there is a large area of commercial forestation operated by the Forestry Commission to the west of Laurieston. Tourists and locals visit the area to watch wild birds at the RSPB Nature Reserve at Duchrae, the Ken-Dee Marshes. A number of red kite have been re-introduced to the area and can be seen near Laurieston at the Bellymack feeding station.

The 2008 horror film Outpost and its 2012 sequel Outpost:Black Sun were filmed on the Balmaghie estate.

The 2018 mystery novel The Shadow of the Black Earl by Charles E. McGarry is set in a fictionalised version of Laurieston Hall and surrounding area.

== Balmaghie Kirk ==
The ecclesiastical focus of Balmaghie was Balmaghie Kirk, until its closure in 2015. Plans to sell the church for housing conversion were withdrawn following widespread protests and a petition and it has now been taken over by the Balmaghie Sacred Landscape Trust and the building is now in community use.

The church was built in 1794 and set on a small hillock in Balmaghie overlooking Loch Ken and opposite Crossmichael Kirk on the far bank. Remodelling was carried out by Peddie and Kinnear in 1891–94. The tower was reduced and reroofed in 1893 by William Davidson.

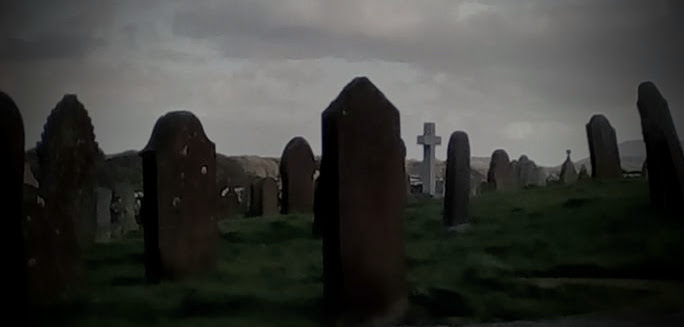
Gravestones at Balmaghie Churchyard

The Balmaghie War Memorial was designed by the sculptor Alexander Carrick in Cullaloe stone and unveiled in 1920.

== Estates ==
- Balmaghie, house of 1874-80 by John Burnet and John James Burnet, now reduced in size.
- Hensol or Duchrae, house c1824 designed by Robert Lugar.
- Laurieston Hall, mansion dating from the 17th century with additions in 1893 by architect Sydney Mitchell.
- Livingston House, mid-18th-century lairds house.
- Netherhall, situated on the river Dee, home of the Ross family.
- Slogarie, house of 1886 by Peddie and Kinnear, remodelled after a fire by Antony Curtiss Wolffe 1960s.

== People ==
- Archibald the Grim (c. 1330 – c. 24 December 1400), Lord of Galloway, builder of Threave Castle
- John M'Millan (1669-1753), Cameronian preacher, founder of the Reformed Presbytery. He preached for the first time in Balmaghie Church on 22 December 1700, apparently as ordinary supply, and on 30 April 1701, was elected to the parish.
- John Neilson (1776–1848), born in Dornal, Balmaghie, to William Neilson and Isabel Brown; emigrated to Quebec City, Lower Canada; publisher, bookseller, and leading politician.
- Rear Admiral James Murray Gordon (1782–1850), of Balmaghie House, buried in his private chapel-mausoleum on the estate.
- Margaret McNaughton (1856–1915), Scottish Canadian author and historian. Born in Balmaghie in 1856 to Thomas Peebles and his wife Jane, emigrated to Canada, where she married Montreal-born Archibald McNaughton. Her account of her husband's experiences travelling across Canada to the Cariboo gold fields was the second non-fiction book published by a woman in British Columbia.
- Samuel Rutherford Crockett (1859–1914), novelist of Scottish historical fiction. He was born at Duchrae Farm, Balmaghie, on 24 September 1859, the illegitimate son of dairymaid Annie Crocket. Some of his works are set in the surrounding area. He died in Tarascon in France on 16 April 1914. His remains were buried in the family grave in his home kirkyard at Balmaghie. A memorial to him was erected in Laurieston by public subscription in 1932.
- John McCrae (1872–1918), wrote "In Flanders Fields" died of pneumonia near the end of the Great War. His parents farmed at Laurieston and emigrated to Canada.
- Admiral Sir Nigel Henderson (1909–1993) and his wife Catherine Maitland, lived at Hensol House, former home of the Cuninghame family, and Helen, Marchioness of Ailsa.
- Lieutenant-Colonel Sir Walter Hugh Malcolm Ross, GCVO, OBE, GCStJ (1943–2019) was a member of the Royal Household. Appointed Lord Lieutenant of the Stewartry 2006 and resigned 2018. Lived at Netherhall.

== Gallery ==
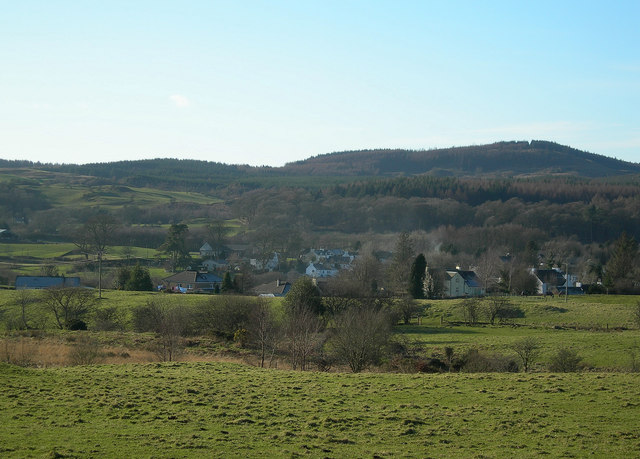
Laurieston willage

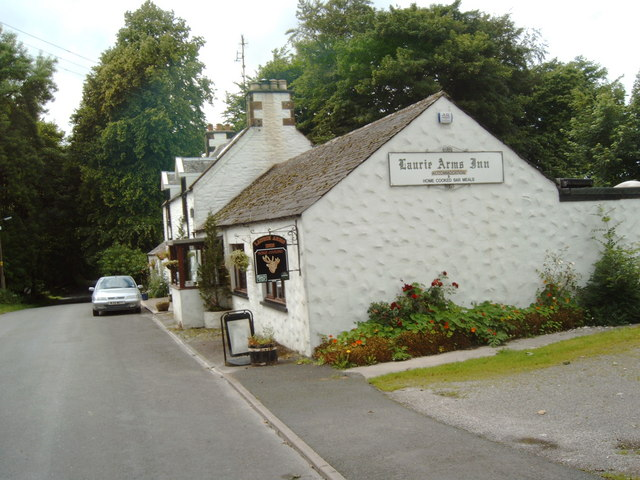
Laurie Arms Inn, Laurieston

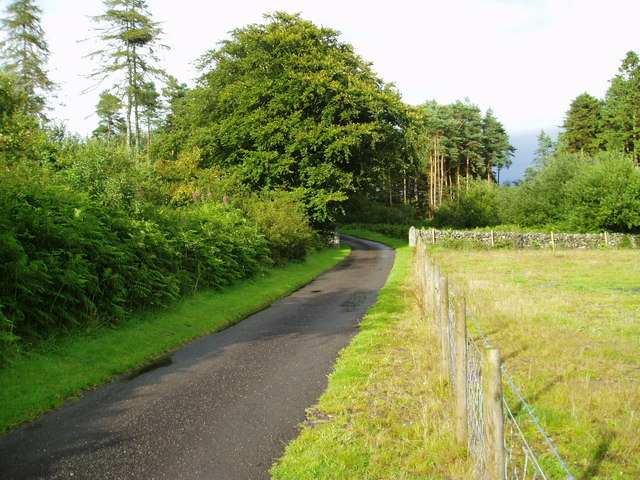
Kirk Road to Balmaghie Kirk

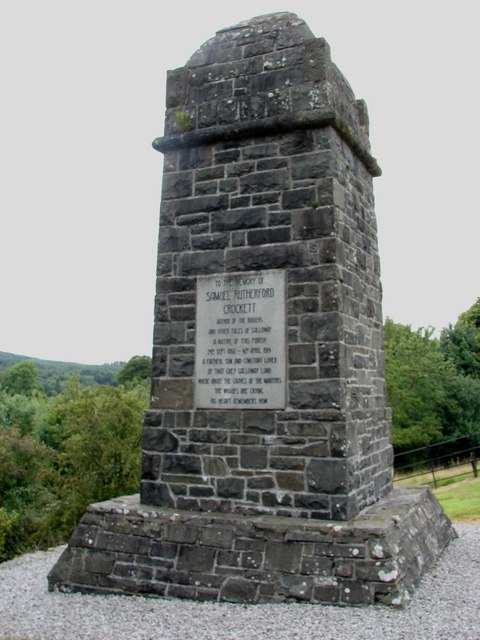
S.R. Crockett memorial, Laurieston

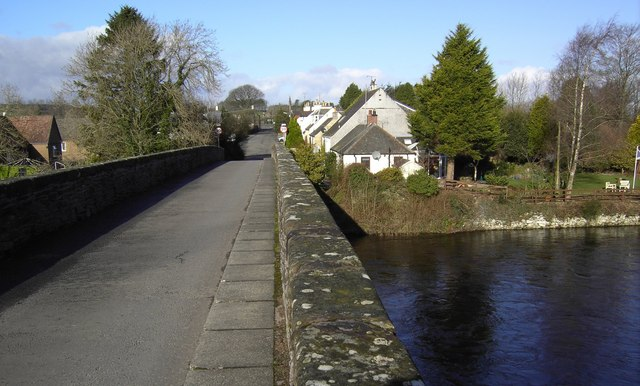
Brig o Dee hamlet

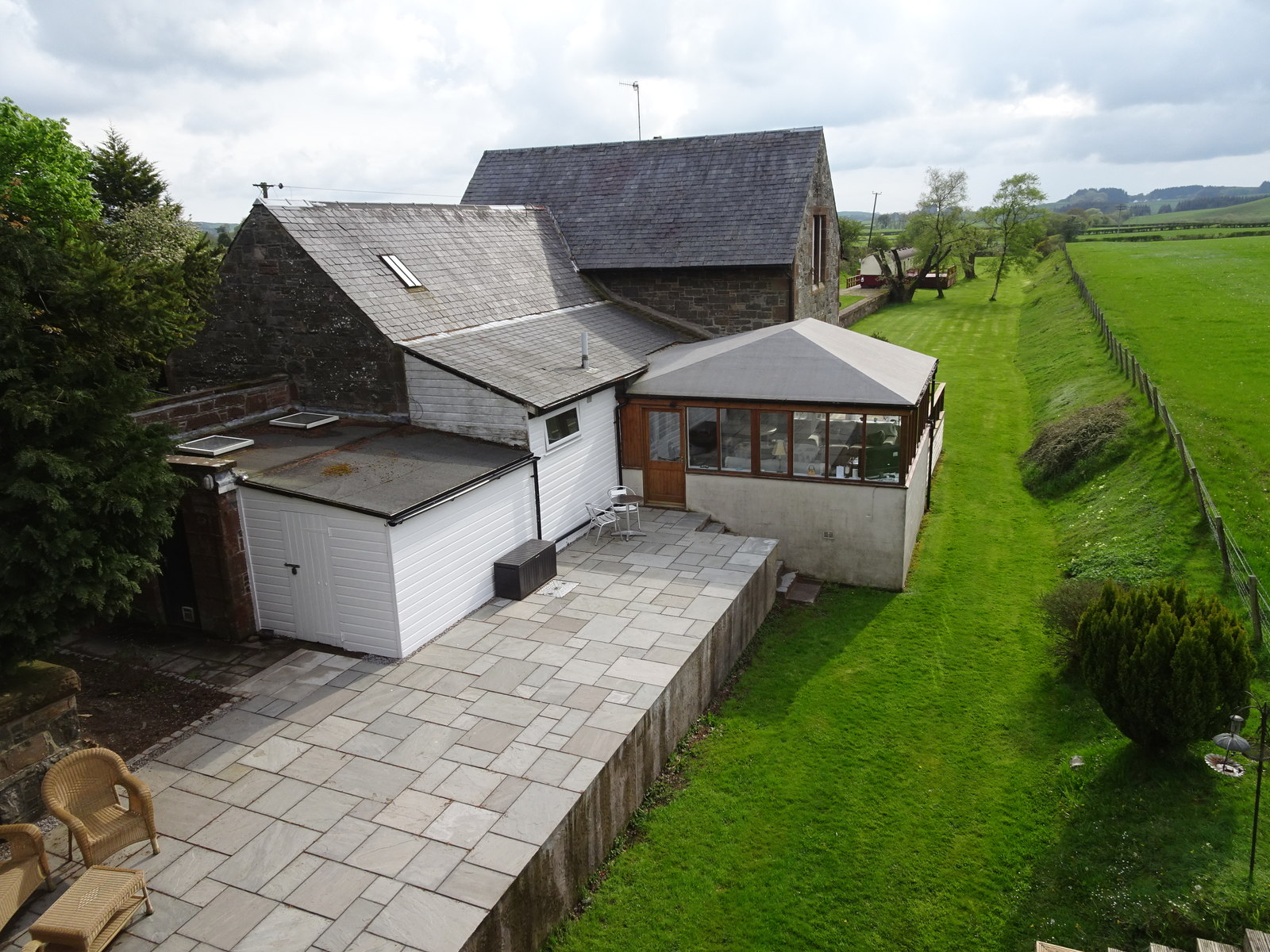
the old Bridge of Dee railway station

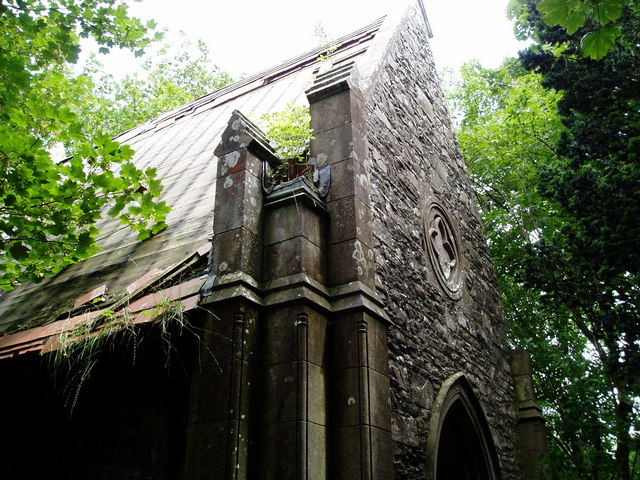
Admiral Gordon's chapel, Glenlochar

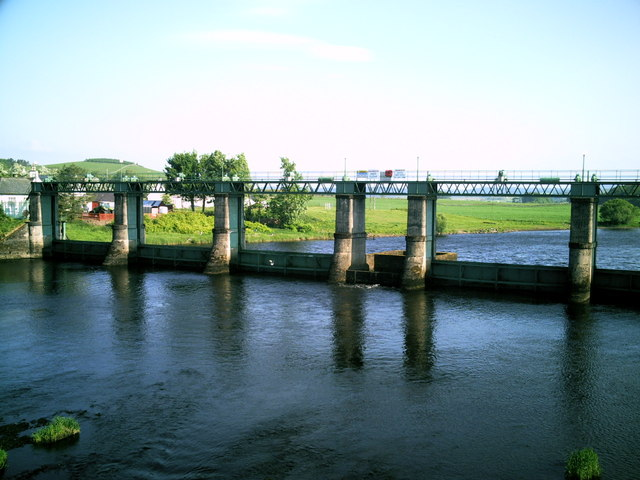
Glenlochar Barrage

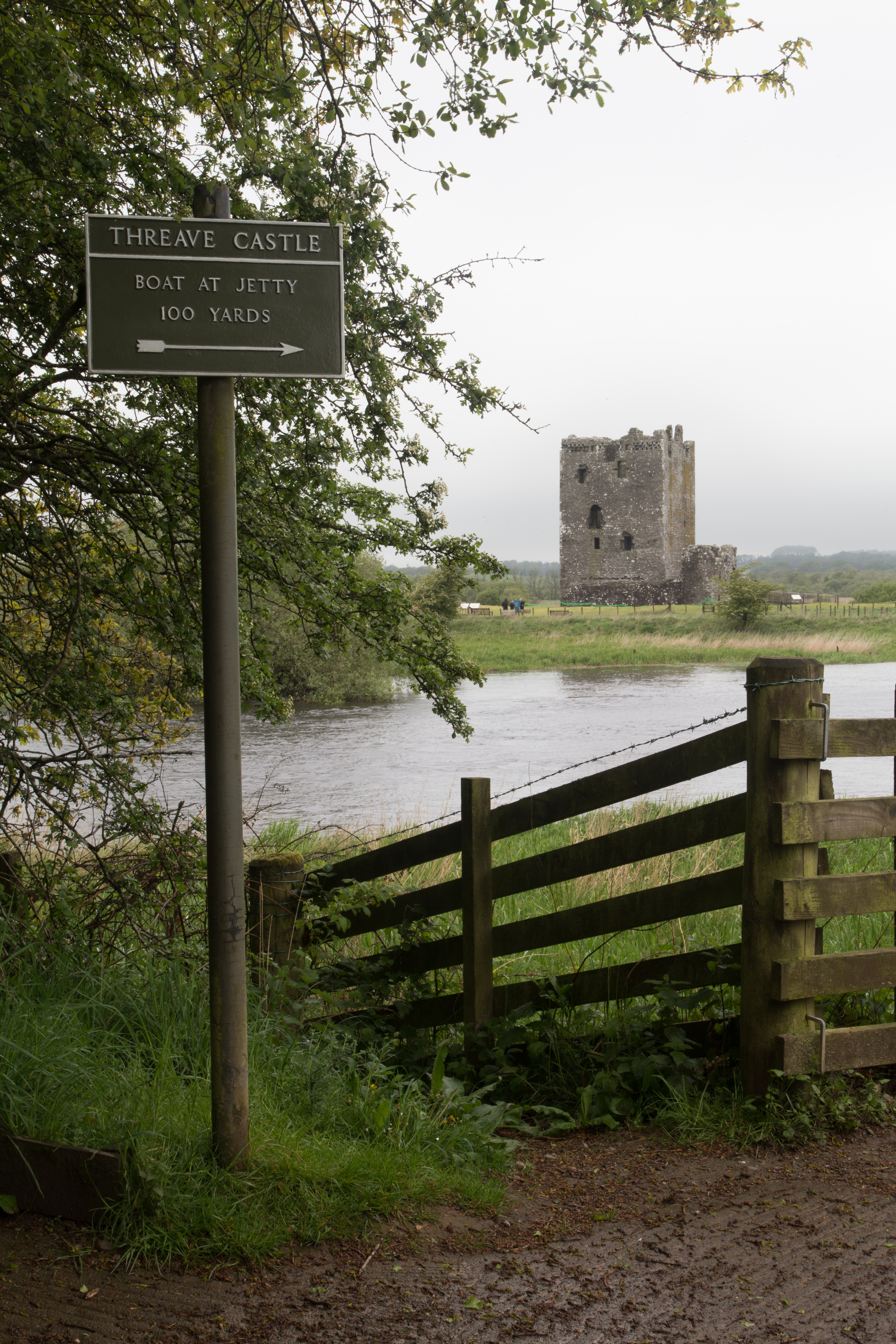
Threave Castle

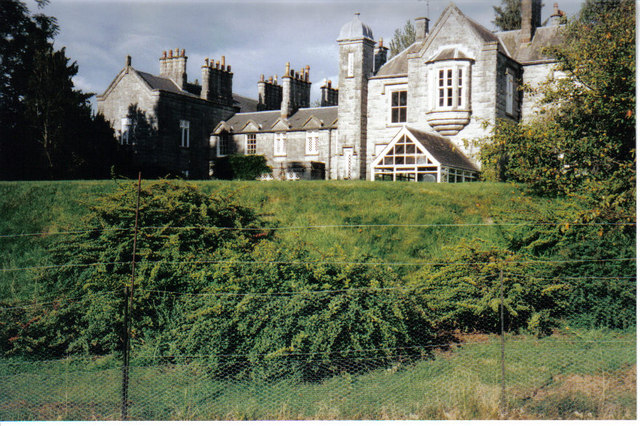
Hensol House

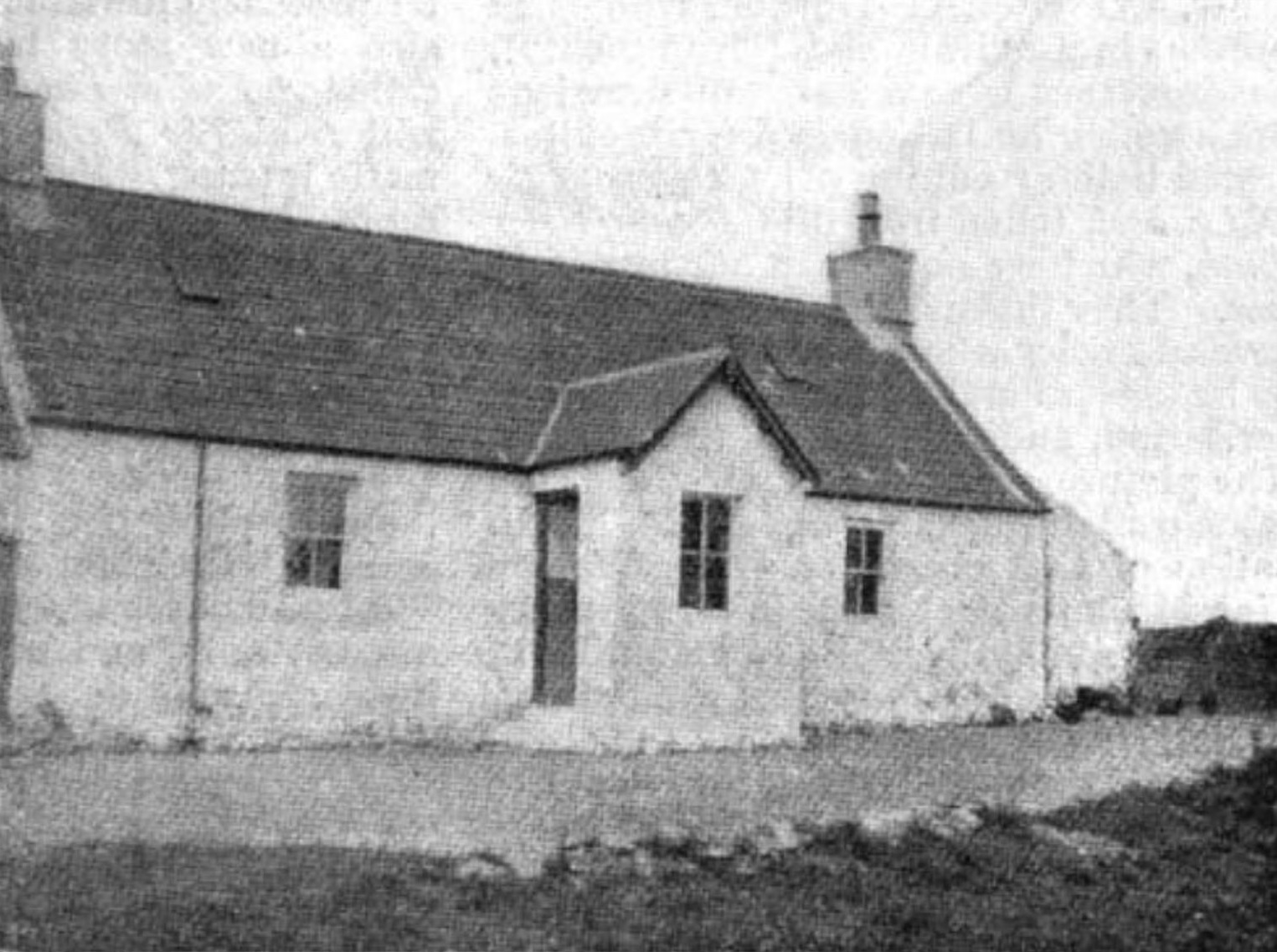
Little Duchrae, birthplace of S.R. Crockett

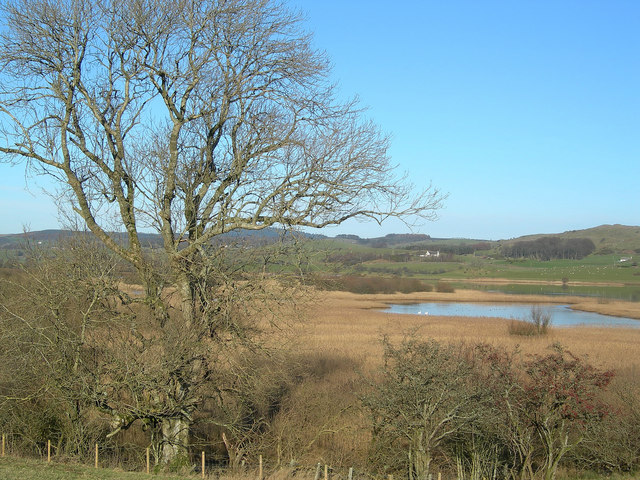
Ken-Dee Marshes from the Balmaghie Kirkyard

== See also ==
- Galloway Hoard
- List of listed buildings in Balmaghie, Dumfries and Galloway
