= Cameronian =

Scottish Covenanter radical faction

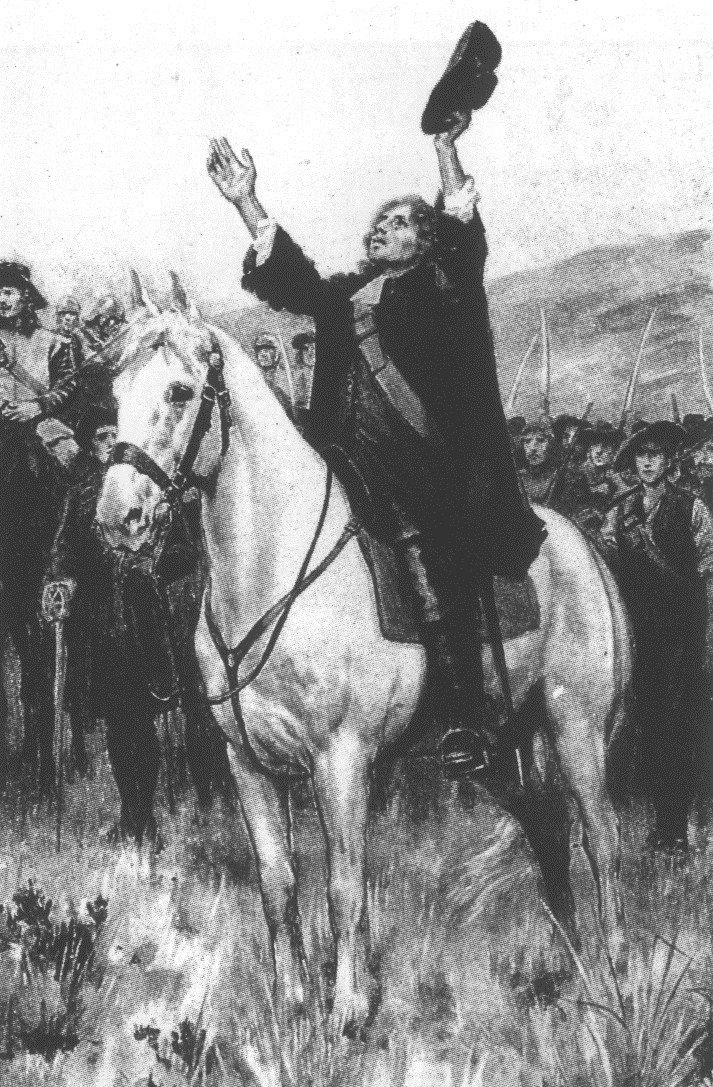
Iconic depiction of Richard Cameron, "Lion of the Covenant"

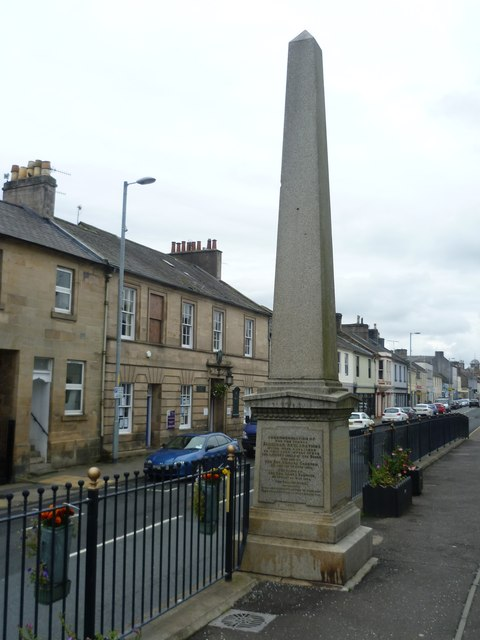
Sanquhar Declarations Monument

Cameronian was a name given to a radical faction of Scottish Covenanters who followed the religious teachings of Richard Cameron, and who were composed principally of those who signed the Sanquhar Declaration in 1680. The group challenged King Charles II’s religious policy and remained outside the established Church of Scotland.

The background to the group originated in 1638 when the Scottish covenanters signed the Solemn League and Covenant, supporting their right to worship God as they saw fit, rather than following the episcopal system favoured by King Charles I. This was seen as illegal by the authorities.

They were also known as Society Men, Sanquharians, and Hillmen. The Societies of Cameronians for the Maintenance of the Presbyterian Form of Worship were formed about 1681. There is no evidence that organised bands came from any parish or district to either Drumclog or Bothwell Bridge in June 1679. The United Societies were not in existence at that period. After 1688 it was different. The Covenanters were by then organised in their Societies which were again united in larger groups called "Correspondences."

Their testimony, "The Informatory Vindication", was published in 1687. They quickly became the most pronounced and active adherents of the covenanting faith. The Cameronians were part of the Covenanting party but it has to be remembered that they formed only a section of the party. Alexander Peden, to take one example, never belonged to the Societies, and there is some reason to believe that John Brown of Priesthill was actually expelled from their membership.

They wished to restore the ecclesiastical order which had existed between 1638 and 1649, and were dissatisfied with the moderate character of the religious settlement of 1690. After the religious settlement of 1690, those who could not accept its terms did not join the reconstituted church. Refusing to take oaths of allegiance to an uncovenanted ruler, or to exercise any civil function, they passed through a period of trial and found some difficulty in maintaining a regular ministry, but in 1706 they were reinforced by some converts from the established church. They objected strongly to the proposal for the union of England and Scotland, and were suspected of abetting a rising which took place in the west of Scotland in 1706; but there appears to be no foundation for the statement that they intrigued with the Jacobites, and they gave no trouble to the government either in 1715 or in 1745. In 1712 they publicly renewed their covenants at Auchensaugh Hill in Lanarkshire, and in 1713 their first presbytery was founded at Braehead.

They found themselves with no ministers when Alexander Shields and his colleagues joined the Church of Scotland as it was reconstituted following the Revolution, earlier ministers being killed in the field or on the scaffold. Eventually they were joined by John M'Millan and later Thomas Nairn who provided the quorum to constitute a Presbytery. They took the official title of the Reformed Presbytery in 1743 before which they liked to be called the Suffering Remnant of the true Presbyterian Church of Christ in Scotland. A presbytery was formed in North America in 1774.

== Religious legacy ==
Following an 1863 division, the majority of the body of the Reformed Presbyterians united with the Free Church of Scotland, leaving the tiny minority as the last representatives of the Cameronians; it retains the name of Reformed Presbyterian Church of Scotland.

== Military legacy ==
In the British army the Cameronians (Scottish Rifles) was a regiment directly descended from the Cameronian guard, created in 1689. It was raised by James Douglas, Earl of Angus, fought at the battle of Dunkeld and was afterwards employed to restore order in the Highlands. One of the regimental traditions was to issue a Bible to every new recruit; another was that the troops went under arms to church services, and the service only started after sentries had been posted on four sides of the church building.

The regiment was disbanded in 1968.

== See also ==
- William Cleland (poet)
- James Hyslop (poet)
