= Kirkcaldy and Dysart =

Civil parish in Fife, Scotland

Kirkcaldy and Dysart is a civil parish on the south coast of Fife, Scotland, lying on the Firth of Forth, containing the towns of Kirkcaldy and Dysart and their hinterland. The civil parish was formed in December 1901 by an amalgamation of the parishes of Kirkcaldy, Dysart and Abbotshall, along with the portion of the parish of Kinghorn which lay within the burgh of Kirkcaldy. However, the parish of Abbotshall was originally part of the parish of Kirkcaldy and had only been disjoined from it in 1650.

The civil parish of Kirkcaldy and Dysart is bounded on the south by the parish of Kinghorn and a small section of Auchtertool, on the west by Auchterderran, on the north by Kinglassie, on the north-west by Markinch and on the east by Wemyss. It contains the community council areas of Kirkcaldy West, Templehall, Kirkcaldy North (Dunnikier), Bennochy/Hayfield, East Kirkcaldy, Dysart and Thornton.

The civil parish had a population of 49,918 in 2011. and its area is 9,581 acres (3,877 ha).
