= Howie =

Origin
- Meaning: "hollow"
- Region of origin: Scotland

Other names
- Variant form: Howey

Howie is a Scottish locational surname derived from a medieval estate in Ayrshire, southwest Scotland. While its ancient name is known as "The lands of How", its exact location is lost to time. The word "How", predating written history, appears to originate from the ancient Kingdom of Strathclyde as a locational description of a "hollow" (deep valley). The alternative spelling of Howie is Howey. The oldest public record of the surname dates to 1526 in the town of Brechin. People with the surname or its variant include:

== Howie ==
- Al Howie (1945–2016), Canadian athlete
- Alison Howie (born 1991), Scottish field hockey player
- Archibald Howie (born 1934), British physicist
- Fanny Howie (1868–1916), New Zealand singer and composer
- Forbes Howie (1920–2000), Scottish businessman
- George Howie (1899–1979), American racecar driver
- Gillian Howie, British philosopher
- Gordon Howie (born 1949), American politician
- Hugh Howie (1924–1958), Scottish footballer
- James Howie (disambiguation)
- John Howie (biographer) (1735–1793), Scottish biographer
- John Howie (businessman) (1833–1895), Scottish businessman
- John Mackintosh Howie (1936–2011), Scottish mathematician
- Robert Howie (disambiguation)
- Thomas D. Howie (1908–1944), American army officer
- Thomas W. Howie (1856–1927), Scottish businessman
- William Howie, Baron Howie of Troon (1924–2018), British politician

== Howey ==
- Benjamin Franklin Howey (1828–1895), American politician
- Brianne Howey (born 1989), American actress
- Clair E. Howey (?), American co-founder of the architecture firm Fanning Howey
- Elsie Howey (1884–1963), English suffragette
- Hugh Howey (born 1975), American author
- Kate Howey (born 1973), British judoka
- John Howey (1932–2019), American architect
- Joseph Howey (1901–1973), American physicist
- Laura E. Howey (1851–1911), American teacher and temperance leader
- Lee Howey (born 1969), English footballer
- Noelle Howey (born 1971/1972), American writer
- Howey Ou (Ou Hongyi, 欧泓奕) (born 2002/2003), Chinese climate activist
- Peter Howey (born 1958), English footballer
- Steve Howey (actor) (born 1977), American actor
- Steve Howey (footballer) (born 1971), English footballer
- Walter Howey (1882–1954), American journalist and editor
- William John Howey (1876–1938), American developer, grower and politician
  - SEC v. W. J. Howey Co., United States Supreme Court case

== Fictional characters ==
- Howie Hardy, a composer and musician in the 1987-1996 animated Teenage Mutant Ninja Turtles TV series
- Sergeant Neil Howie of the West Highland Constabulary, the mainland policeman who visits an isolated Hebridean island in search of a missing girl in the 1973 film The Wicker Man
