= Robert McGhee =

Robert McGhee may refer to:

- Robert James M'Ghee (1789–1872), Church of Ireland minister
- Robert McGhee (politician) (c. 1834–1893), Canadian political figure
- Robert McGhee (minister) (1929–1996), Church of Scotland minister
- Robert McGhee (archaeologist) (born 1941), Canadian archaeologist
- Robert McGhee (cricketer) (born 1963), Australian cricketer
