= Forbes Howie =

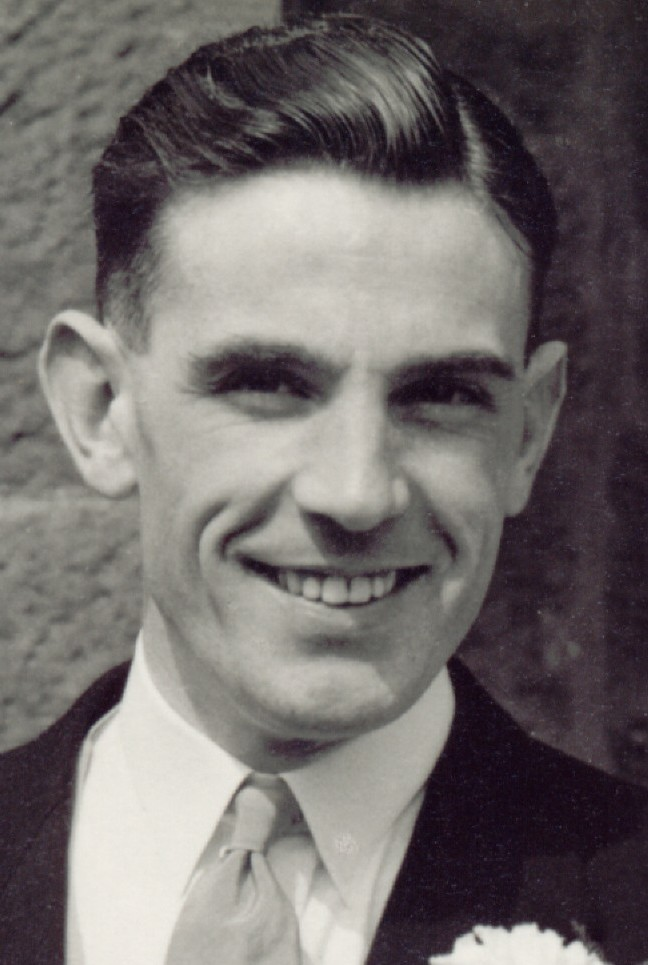
- Born: William Forbes Howie; 13 August 1920; Falkirk, Scotland, UK
- Died: 27 December 2000 (aged 80); Falkirk, Scotland, UK
- Spouse: Janet Morrison Campbell
- Parent(s): Robert Wyllie Howie; Anne Steuart Forbes

William Forbes Howie, DL, JP (13 August 1920 – 27 December 2000) was a businessman who played an active role in Scottish public life.

== Background and education ==
Born one of six children in Woodlands, Falkirk, Scotland, he was the son of Anne Steuart (Forbes) and Robert Wyllie Howie, and the grandson of businessman Thomas W. Howie. Considered too frail to follow his brothers to the High School of Glasgow, he was therefore cared for by a maid and educated at local schools. He then studied electrical engineering at Glasgow University, graduating in 1941. He served in the RAF for four years during the Second World War, gaining the rank of Flight Lieutenant.

== Career ==
Howie was assistant managing director of Thomas Laurie & Co, his uncle's motor and electrical engineering firm, from 1947 to 1957, becoming managing director upon his uncle's death until his own retirement in 1981. Thomas Laurie & Co was founded in 1882 and had fitted the first fully automated street lighting in Britain, in Falkirk; it was also a car dealership, most recently for Peugeot. Turnover surpassed £1 million in the early 1970s.

As well as being an associate of the Royal Technical College, Glasgow, a Member of the Institute of Electrical Engineers and an associate member of the Institute of the Motor Industry, Howie also served on the Engineering Advisory Committee of Falkirk College of Technology.

== Civil duties ==
Howie was made responsible for the setting up of the Children's Hearing system in Falkirk, becoming the first chairman of the local Children's Panel Advisory Committee in 1970, chairman of the Supplementary Benefit Appeal Tribunal in 1973, and a Justice of the Peace the following year. In 1981 he was appointed Her Majesty's Deputy Lord Lieutenant for the County of Stirling, representing HM The Queen at official functions. In 1983 he was appointed General Commissioner of Income Tax, a position he held until the age of 75.

== Interests ==
A keen supporter of the Scout movement, having met Robert Baden-Powell in person in his youth, he held the position of District Commissioner for Falkirk District for 18 years. He then became chairman of the Falkirk District Scout Association, becoming honorary president in 1978. At that time he was also appointed chairman of the Forth Valley Scout Council, representing this body on the Scottish Committee of the Scout Association, a post he held until 1989. He received the Medal of Merit in 1956, the Silver Acorn in 1981, and the Silver Wolf, the highest Scouting award given to just one in two million members, in 1989, for 'services of the most exceptional character to the movement'.

He founded the Stirling and District Amateur Football Association in 1951, as well as serving on the board of the Scottish Wildlife Trust. His interest in nature, particularly geology, led to him gaining a Bachelor of Arts in Ecology from the Open University in his retirement. He was also president of Falkirk Rotary Club and was made a Paul Harris Fellow. He was also president of Falkirk Fishing Club and the Toastmasters Club and a director of Glenbervie Golf Club. He was also chairman of the local Age Concern.

Throughout his life he had a close association with the Church, joining St. Andrew's West in Falkirk in 1951, elected a deacon in 1953 and ordained an elder in 1956. In 1979 he was elected session clerk, a post he held until ailing health forced him to resign in 1989.

== Family ==
Howie married Janet Morrison Campbell and had two sons and one daughter, and seven grandchildren. He was the uncle of Scottish actor and comedian Robbie Coltrane.

== Other ==
- Uncle of actor Robbie Coltrane
- Nephew of Ross Haddow, Lord Dean of Guild of Glasgow
