= John Howie =

John Howie may refer to:

- John Howie (biographer) (1735–1793), Scottish writer
- John Mackintosh Howie (1936–2011), Scottish mathematician
- John Howie (businessman) (1833–1895), industrialist and investor
