= Ross Haddow =

Major Ross Taylor Haddow, MC, KS, JP, MA, LLB, CA, Lord Dean of Guild of Glasgow (1896–1973), was a prominent Glasgow businessman and politician.

== Biography ==
Haddow took a degree in law from the University of Edinburgh, and as one of Glasgow's most senior accountants, he was appointed Lord Dean of Guild of the Merchants House of Glasgow (Glasgow's "second citizen" after the Lord Provost) and served on the city's council. In spite of this he lived in Woodlands, Falkirk and was Honorary President of the Stirlingshire Conservative and Unionist Party Association. As a lieutenant, he was awarded the Military Cross.

Haddow married Jean Howie, daughter of Thomas W. Howie, and together they had one daughter. Jean Howie's uncle was Deputy Town Clerk of Glasgow.
