= Garnock =

Garnock may refer to:

- The River Garnock in North Ayrshire, Scotland
- Glengarnock, a small village on the river, once the site of Glengarnock Steelworks.
- Garnock Valley area of North Ayrshire, which takes in the towns of Beith, Dalry and Kilbirnie.
- Garnock Academy in Kilbirnie, a secondary school formed in 1971.
- Garnock RFC, a rugby club located at Lochshore, Glengarnock.
- Garnock Way soap opera, produced by Scottish Television from 1976 to 1979.
- Robert Garnock (1660–1681), Scottish covenanter
