= Howey =

Howey is a Scottish surname and or a person, and may also refer to:

In other uses:

- Howey, a village in Disserth and Trecoed, Powys, Wales
- Howey-in-the-Hills, Florida, USA
  - Howey House, historic home
- Howey Place, Melbourne, Australia
- Howey test, a rule defining the meaning of “investment contract” in U.S. securities law
