= Robert Cranston =

Robert Cranston may refer to:

- Robert Cranston (boxer) (1928–2014), Indian Olympic boxer
- Robert Cranston (Scottish politician) (1843–1923), lord provost of Edinburgh
- Robert B. Cranston (1791–1873), U.S. representative from Rhode Island
- Robert Cranston (cricketer) (1890–1959), Scottish cricketer and civil servant
