= Archibald Riddell (minister) =

Scottish Presbyterian church minister

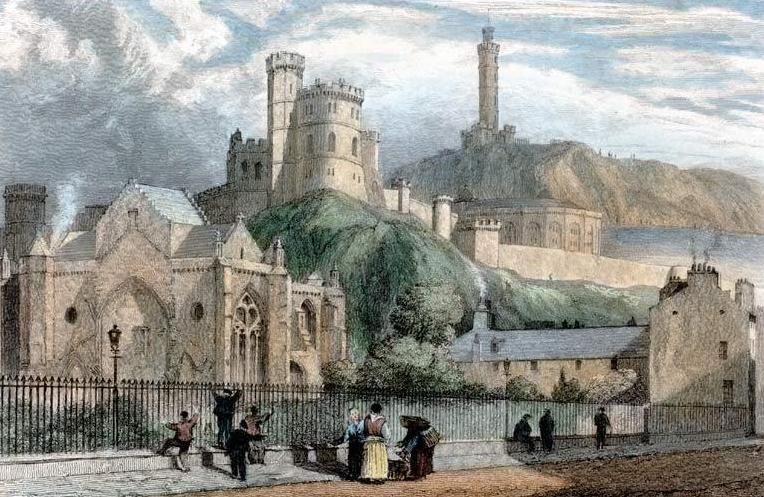
- Trinity College Kirk, Riddell's last charge
- Church: Kippen, First Presbyterian Church, Woodbridge, New Jersey, Weymss, Kirkcaldy, Trinity College Kirk

Orders
- Ordination: private at Kippen

Personal details
- Born: 1635
- Died: 1708 (aged 72–73) Edinburgh
- Denomination: Christian
- Spouse: died in transit to America
- Children: four: Janet (m. James Dundas), Walter (naval officer) and John (physician) and Sarah (Mrs John Currie)
- Education: University of Edinburgh

Rev Archibald Riddell (1635–1708) was a Scots-born 17th-century Presbyterian church minister in Scotland and America. His name is sometimes spelled Riddel. A supporter of the Scottish Reformation, he refused to follow the episcopal church of the king of England, and preached as a Covenanter. He preached at conventicles in a time when such actions were considered high treason. He was imprisoned on the Bass Rock and was later banished to New Jersey.

== Early life ==
His father was Sir Walter, second baronet of Riddell. His mother was Janet, daughter of William Rigg of Athernie, in Fife. Archibald had two older brothers: Sir John, who succeeded his father; and William, who started the Riddells of Glen-Riddell, in Dumfries-shire. Archibald graduated from the University of Edinburgh on 9 July 1656 with a Master of Arts degree.

== Early career ==
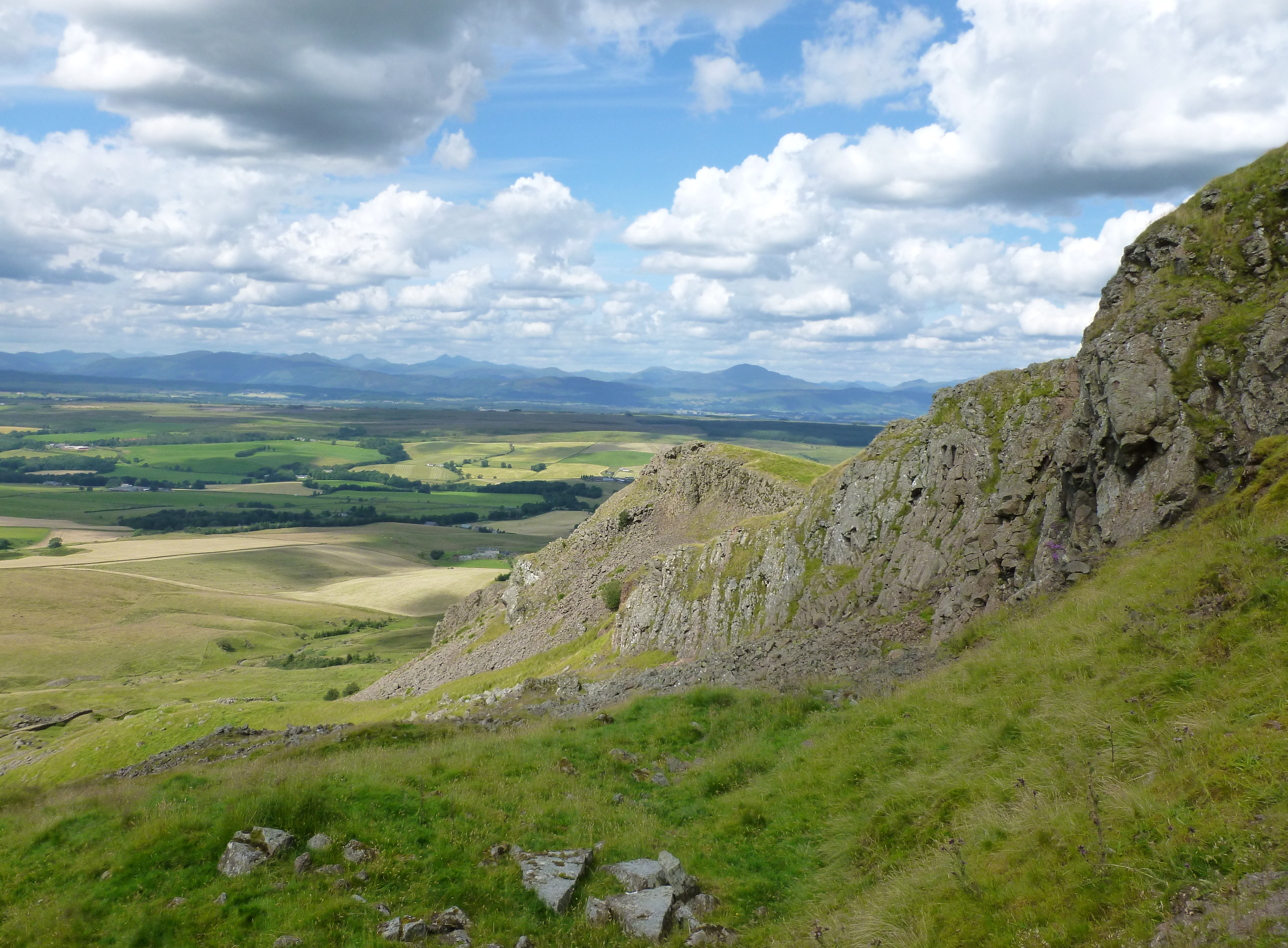
Crags and scree in the Corrie of Balglass, near Fintry. A conventicle was held there which was attacked when it did not disperse when ordered to.

Archibald was privately ordained to the ministry at Kippen by John Law around 1670. He was a field preacher along with John Blackadder and John Dickson. At one such conventicle, at which Robert Garnock was present there was an exchange of gunfire with government soldiers. Riddell was caught for keeping conventicles, by the laird of Graden, a relative of his wife, in September 1680 and taken to Jedburgh tolbooth before being taken to the Edinburgh Tolbooth for about nine months. "From there he was sentenced to the Bass Rock, on 8 July 1681 to remain prisoner there."

Following a petition from George Scot (whose wife was Riddell's cousin) who had himself been a prisoner on the Bass he was released from prison to be banished to a plantation in America along with other prisoners several of whom had been tortured:

"Edinburgh, 24th December 1684. The Lords of his Majesty's Privy Council having considered a petition presented by Mr George Scot of Pitlochie, desiring that, in regard the Council have granted him the benefit of some persons lately sentenced to the plantations, in order to their being transported thither, and that he is willing to transport Mr Archibald Riddell, prisoner in the Bass, liberty might be granted to him for some time to put his affairs in order, and attend several processes now depending both for and against him before the Session, upon the petitioner's being cautioner for him, that he shall immediately after his liberty, come to his own lodgings in Edinburgh, and confine himself there during his abode here, and, in the mean time, keep no conventicles; and be by him transported to East Jersey in America, and never return to this kingdom thereafter, without special licence from the Council : The said Lords do grant the said desire, and recommend to the Lord High Chancellor, governor of the said Isle of Bass, to give order and warrant to his deputy-governor of that isle, to deliver to the petitioner, or his order, the person of the said Mr Archibald Riddell, in regard the petitioner hath become caution to the effect foresaid, under the penalty of five thousand merks Scots money, in case of failure in any of the premises."

== Voyage and New Jersey ==
The voyage on the Henry & Francis was disastrous in that about 24 percent of the passengers died including George Scot and Riddell's wife and three of her relations. Riddell received calls to pastor three churches, one in New Bridge, one in Long Island and one in Woodbridge. He chose Woodbridge and preached there until the Glorious Revolution when he tried to return home. It is also recorded that he received a call from a church in Jamaica.

== Return to Scotland ==
In June 1689 he boarded a ship for home, but just off the coast of England, on 2 August, he was captured by a French man-of-war. He and his ten-year-old son were taken as prisoners to France, where they were reportedly cruelly treated and imprisoned for around two years in prisons in Nantes, Rochefort and Dinard. After this lengthy detention they were released by the French government in an exchange programme with King William's government. They were traded for two French priests who had been prisoners in Blackness Castle.

== Later career ==
Riddell was called to become minister of Wemyss on 28 September 1691. His subsequently was translated to Kirkcaldy on 20 May 1697. His final charge was in Trinity College Kirk in Edinburgh in 1702 which was later demolished and rebuilt due it blocking Waverley Station.

He died on 17 February 1708 and was buried in Greyfriars Kirkyard. His great-great-grandson, the advocate, antiquarian and peerage lawyer John Riddell was later buried with him. being the family's representative at the funeral.

== Bibliography ==
- Edin. Beg. (Marr. and Bur.)
- Douglas's Bar.
- Nisbet's Her.
- Wodrow's Anal.
- Playfair's Bar.

== Family ==
He married twice:

Firstly to Helen Aitkenhead, daughter of Rev Henry Aitkenhead, minister of North Berwick, and had two sons, Capt. Walter Bennet of Granton, Edinburgh (d.1738), and Dr John Bennet MD, physician in Edinburgh (d.1740).

Their daughter, Sarah Bennet Riddell, married Rev John Currie, minister of Oldhamstocks in 1703 who became Moderator in 1709. He secondly married Jean Ker of the Canongate in 1694. who survived him.
