= John Howie (biographer) =

Scottish biographer

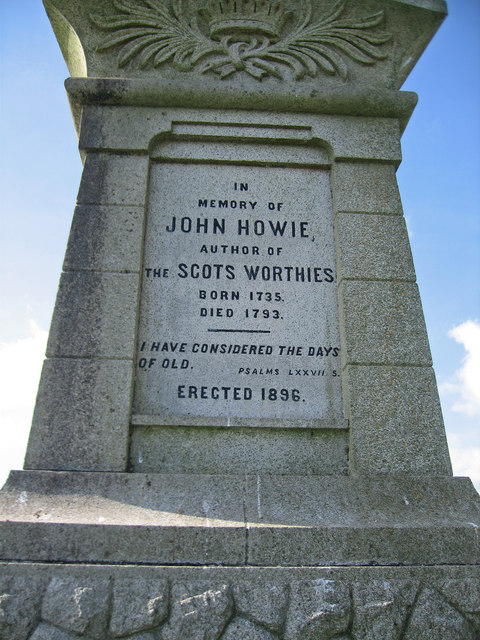
- obelisk in memory of Howie
- Born: 14 November 1735; Lochgoin
- Died: 5 January 1793 (aged 57)
- Occupation: farmer

John Howie (14 November 1735 – 5 January 1793) was a Scottish biographer. His best known work was Biographia Scoticana, first published in 1775, which is often called The Scots Worthies. It deals with Christians and particularly Presbyterians especially in their strivings with church and civil authorities.

== Life ==
John Howie was an East Renfrewshire farmer from Lochgoin, who claimed descent from an Albigensian refugee. The author was the 28th descendant in a direct line, all of whom were called John. Although he was a plain unlettered peasant, cultivating the same farm which his ancestors had occupied for ages, a natural predilection for literary pursuits induced him to take up the task of recording the lives of the martyrs and confessors of Scotland. His family home at Lochgoin Farm was a noted refuge for Covenanters, and was subject to several searches by government soldiers. The farmhouse was rebuilt in the 18th century, with the date 1187 on a lintel marking when the Howies first settled there. Several relics were kept in what has become a small museum, and in 1896 a stone obelisk was erected nearby as a monument "in memory of John Howie, author of the Scots Worthies". It now lies within the area of Whitelee Wind Farm and has track access from the visitor centre.

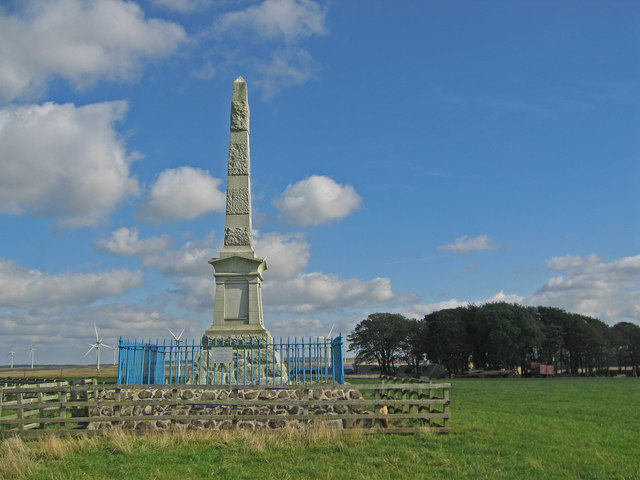
Monument, and site of Lochgoin Farm

== Works ==
Howie wrote Lives of the Protestant worthies of Scotland from Patrick Hamilton, the first martyr, under the title of Biographia Scoticana, first published in 1775. It became a classic of Scottish Church History and was often called The Scots Worthies. He revised and enlarged the work, 1781–5, and this edition was reissued, with notes by William McGavin, in 1827. In 1870 the Rev. William Henderson Carslaw revised Howie's text and published it, with illustrations and notes, and a short biographical introduction; and in 1876 a further illustrated edition appeared, with biographical notice compiled from statements made by Howie's relatives, and an introductory essay by Dr. Robert Buchanan.

A Collection of Lectures and Sermons by Covenanting Clergymen was issued by Howie in 1779, with an introduction by himself. He edited in 1780 Michael Shields's Faithful Contendings Display'd, an account of the Church of Scotland between 1681 and 1691. He also wrote on the Lord's Supper, patronage, and other topics, and prefaced and annotated other religious works.

== The Lives in Biographia Scoticana (2nd edition) ==
John Paton's sword, flag and Bible which were owned by Howie

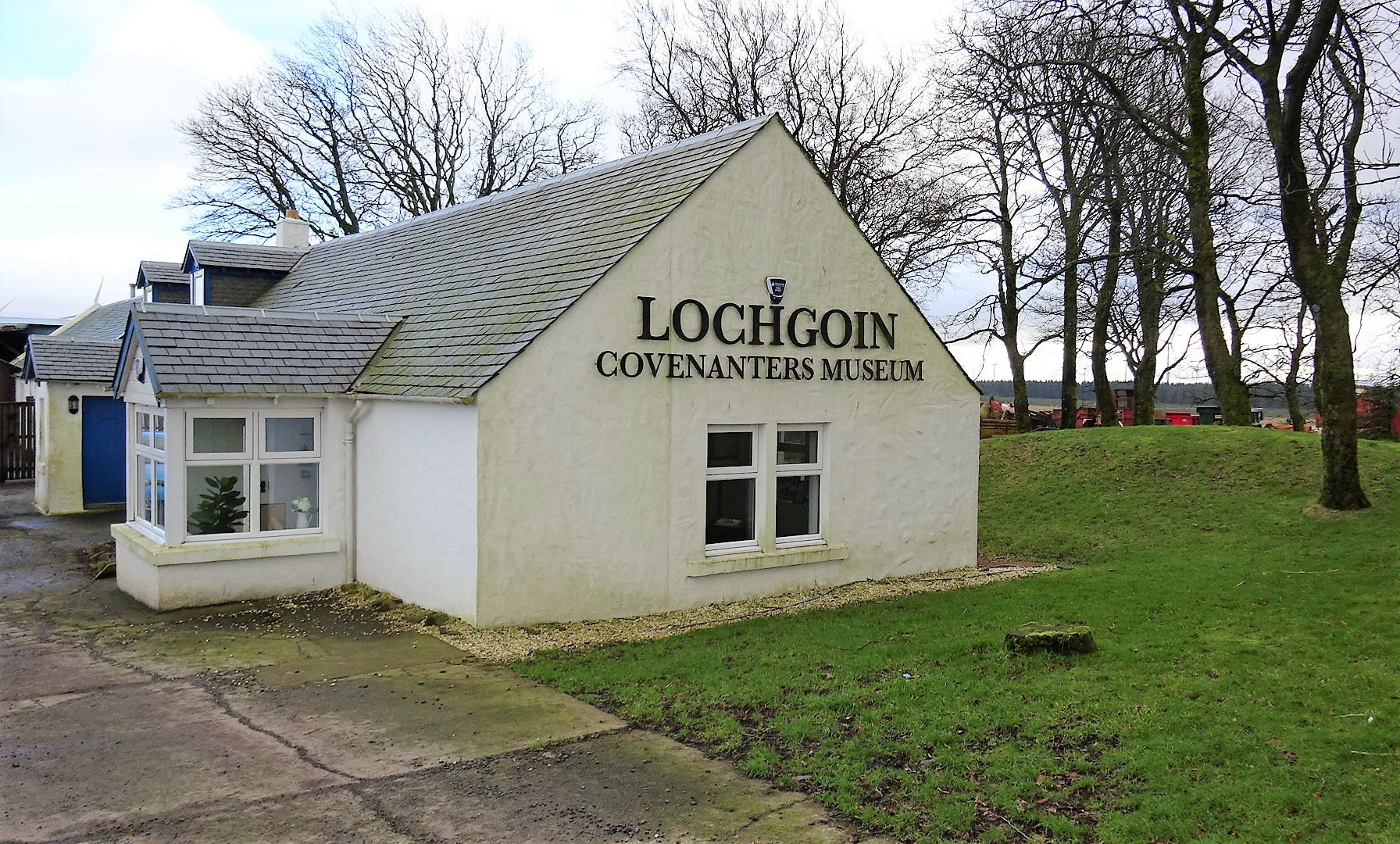
The old Lochgoin Covenanters Museum

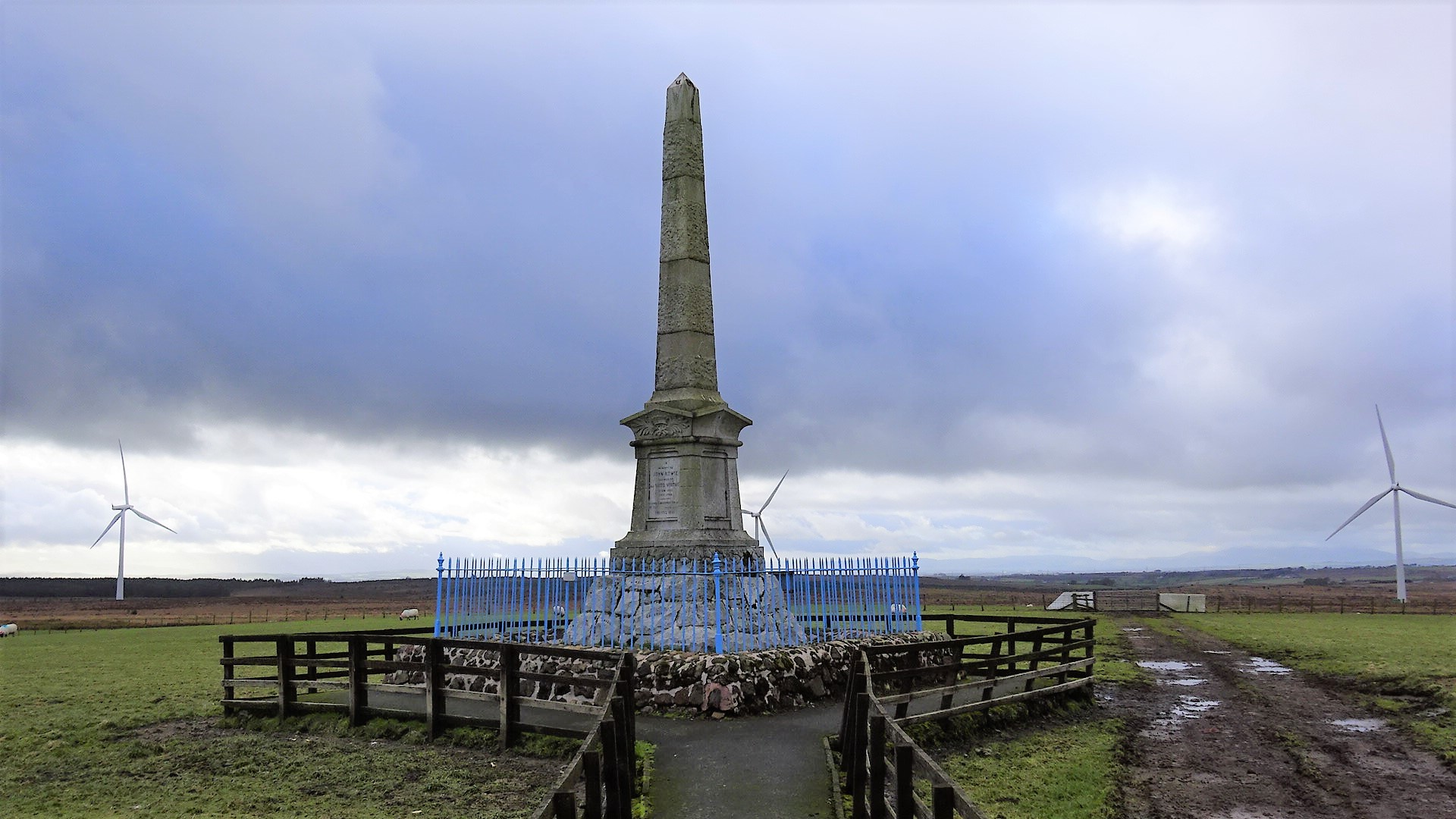
Lochgoin Farm and the John Howie Memorial, East Ayrshire

The list below reflects the chapter order in the book. For an alphabetical list see the "Scots Worthies" template at the foot of the page.

- Patrick Hamilton
- George Wishart
- Walter Mill
- James Stewart, 1st Earl of Moray
- John Knox
- George Buchanan
- Robert Rollock
- John Craig
- David Black
- John Davidson
- William Row
- Andrew Melville
- Patrick Simpson
- Andrew Duncan
- John Scrimgeour
- John Welch
- Robert Boyd
- Robert Bruce
- Josias Welch
- John Gordon, Viscount Kenmuir
- Robert Cunningham
- Alexander Henderson
- George Gillespie
- John M'Clellan
- David Calderwood
- Hugh Binning
- Andrew Gray
- James Durham
- Samuel Rutherford
- Archibald Campbell, Marquis of Argyle
- James Guthrie
- John Campbell, Earl of Loudon
- Robert Baillie
- David Dickson
- Archibald Johnston, Lord Warriston
- James Wood
- William Guthrie
- Hugh Mackail
- John Nevay
- John Livingston
- John Semple
- James Mitchell
- William Gordon of Earlston
- John Kid
- John King
- John Brown of Wamphray
- Henry Hall of Haughhead
- Richard Cameron
- David Hackston of Rathillet
- Robert Ker of Kersland
- Donald Cargill
- Robert Garnock
- Robert M'Ward
- John Paton
- John Nisbet of Hardhill
- Alexander Peden
- John Blackadder
- James Renwick
- Alexander Moncrieff
- Angus MacBean
- Thomas Hog
- Robert Fleming
- Alexander Shields
- John Dickson
- Sir Robert Hamilton of Preston
- William Veitch
- John Balfour of Kinloch
- Robert Traill, father
- Robert Traill, and son

== See also ==
- Robert Wodrow
