= Pulteneytown Parish Church =

Church in Wick, Highland, Scotland

Coordinates: 58°26′17″N 3°5′18″W

Pulteneytown Parish Church is located in Argyle Square, Pulteneytown, Wick, Caithness, Scotland. It is a congregation in the Church of Scotland.

The church building was opened in 1842, but following the Disruption of 1843 the Rev David Mitchell left to become a minister of the Free Church of Scotland in Glasgow. The small rural parish church at Thrumster (5 miles south of Wick) was united with Pulteneytown Church in 1961, both congregations henceforth being served by the same minister. From 1929 until 1990 the congregation was known as "Wick St Andrew's", but following a union with (the now disused) Wick Central Church the original name of Pulteneytown was restored. The building was extensively refurbished in 2003.

In 2007, the Rev William (Bill) F. Wallace, who was one of the candidates for nomination as Moderator of the General Assembly of the Church of Scotland. Mr Wallace was previously a missionary dentist in Ethiopia. A previous minister, Robert McGhee, was also nominated for the position. Both represented the evangelical wing of the Church, Mr. Wallace having been the head of the Forward Together group.

The church continues under an evangelical ministry with the appointment of the Rev Andrew Barrie, formally of Kinmylies Parish Church in Inverness.

== Ministers ==
- Rev David Mitchell 1842–1843
- Various missionaries and ministers 1843–1852
- Rev Duff McDonald 1852–1878
- Rev W Harley Anderson 1878–1894
- Rev Alexander Ross 1894–1936
- Rev Alexander Sutherland 1936-?
- Rev Stephen Green
- Rev George Ramage 1947–1953
- Rev John Robertson 1953–1959
- Rev Dr Robert McGhee 1959–1967
- Rev Alexander Gunn 1967–1974
- Rev William F Wallace 1974–2008
- Rev Stuart Farmes 2011–2013
- Rev Andrew Barrie 2017–2024

== See also ==
- List of Church of Scotland parishes
- Caithness
