= James Howie =

James Howie may refer to:

- James Howie (footballer) (1878–1963), Scottish footballer and manager
- James Howie (priest) (1804–1884), priest of the Church of Ireland
- James Howie (bacteriologist) (1907–1995), Scottish bacteriologist
- Jim Howie (1917–2006), Australian rules footballer
