= John Currie (minister) =

Scottish minister, Moderator of the General Assembly

- Church: Haddington
- Successor: Patrick Wilkie

Minister of Oldhamstocks
- In office 1695–1704

Minister of Haddington
- In office 1704 – 18 June 1720

Moderator
- In office 1709–1710

Personal details
- Born: c. 1670 Ochiltree, Ayrshire, Scotland
- Died: 18 June 1720
- Spouse: Sarah Bennet Riddell
- Children: John Currie; Walter Currie; Isobel Currie

John Currie (c. 1670 – 18 June 1720) was a Prestyberian minister from the Church of Scotland who served as Moderator of the General Assembly of the Church from 1709 to 1710.

== Life ==
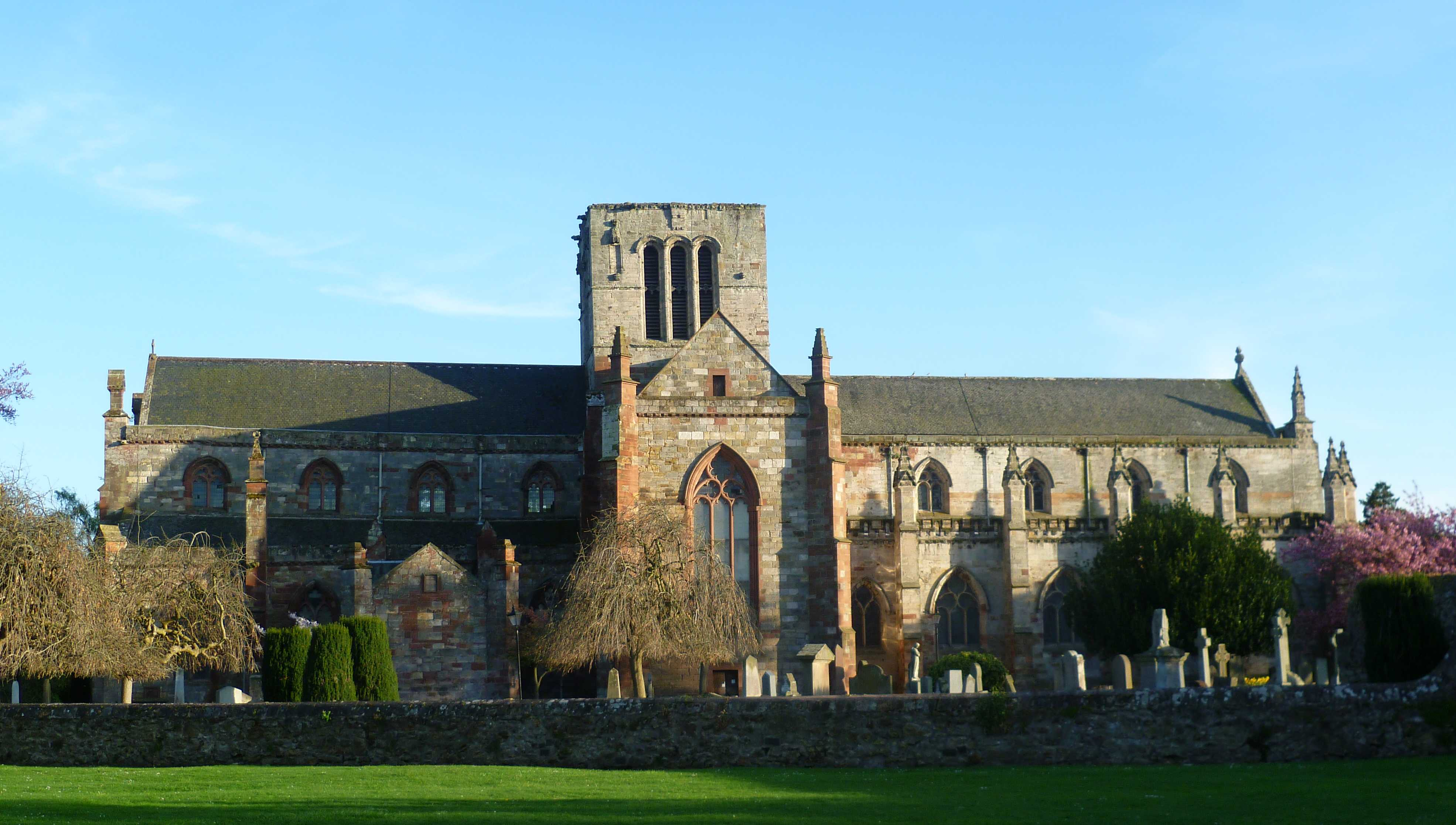
St. Mary's Kirk, Haddington, where Currie was translated to in 1704

Currie was born in Ochiltree, in Ayrshire in around 1670.

He was ordained as the minister of Oldhamstocks in 1695. Currie was translated to St. Mary's in Haddington in 1704. He received a call to St. Cuthbert's in Edinburgh in 1706, but this was blocked by the Presbytery. However, four years later, Currie received a fresh call in 1710.

In 1709, he succeeded Reverend William Carstares as Moderator of the General Assembly of the Church of Scotland, the highest position in the Scottish Church. Despite being notably young at the time for his appointment, Currie was praised for his duties in office, and mention was made of his "prudent conduct".

Currie died on 18 June 1720. His position in Haddington was filled by Reverend Patrick Wilkie.

== Family ==
In November 1703, he married Sarah Bennet Riddell, the daughter of Reverend Archibald Riddell, minister of Trinity College Church in Edinburgh. Their children included John, Walter, and Isobel. John would grow up to be a merchant in Jamaica, while Isobel would marry Thomas Elliot, a lawyer from Edinburgh.
