= Bonaventure Hepburn =

Bonaventure Hepburn OM (born James Hepburn; 14 July 1573, East Lothian – October 1620 or 1621, Venice, Italy) was a Scottish Roman Catholic linguist, lexicographer, philologist and biblical commentator. He was a scholar of some renown and rose to the post of Keeper of Oriental Books and Manuscripts at the Vatican.

In 1591 he published a work on his study of the Hebrew language and in 1616 his work on other foreign languages was published as The Heavenly Golden Rod of the Blessed Virgin Mary in Seventy-two Praises (also known as Virga Aurea), a listing of 72 different alphabets. He was also known for translating into the Latin language the Kettar Malcuth of Rabbi Solomon.

== Early life ==
The son of Thomas Hepburn, the rector of Oldhamstocks, James was brought up as a Protestant. After his studied at St Andrews University he converted to the Catholic Church, lived in France and Italy, and travelled extensively, through "Turkey, Persia, Syria, Palestine, Egypt, Ethiopia, and most of the eastern countries". He then joined the Order of Minims at Avignon.

== See also ==
- Vatican Library
