= Robert Howie =

Robert Howie may refer to:

- Robert Howie (politician) (1929–2017), Canadian politician
- Robert Howie (businessman) (1846–1927), Glasgow businessman
- Robert Howie (principal) (1568–c.1646), Church of Scotland minister
- Robert A. Howie (1923–2012), English petrologist
- Bob Howie (1898–1992), Scottish rugby union player

== See also ==
- Robert Howie Fisher (1861–1934), Scottish minister
