= John King (covenanter) =

Scottish Presbyterian chaplain (d. 1679)

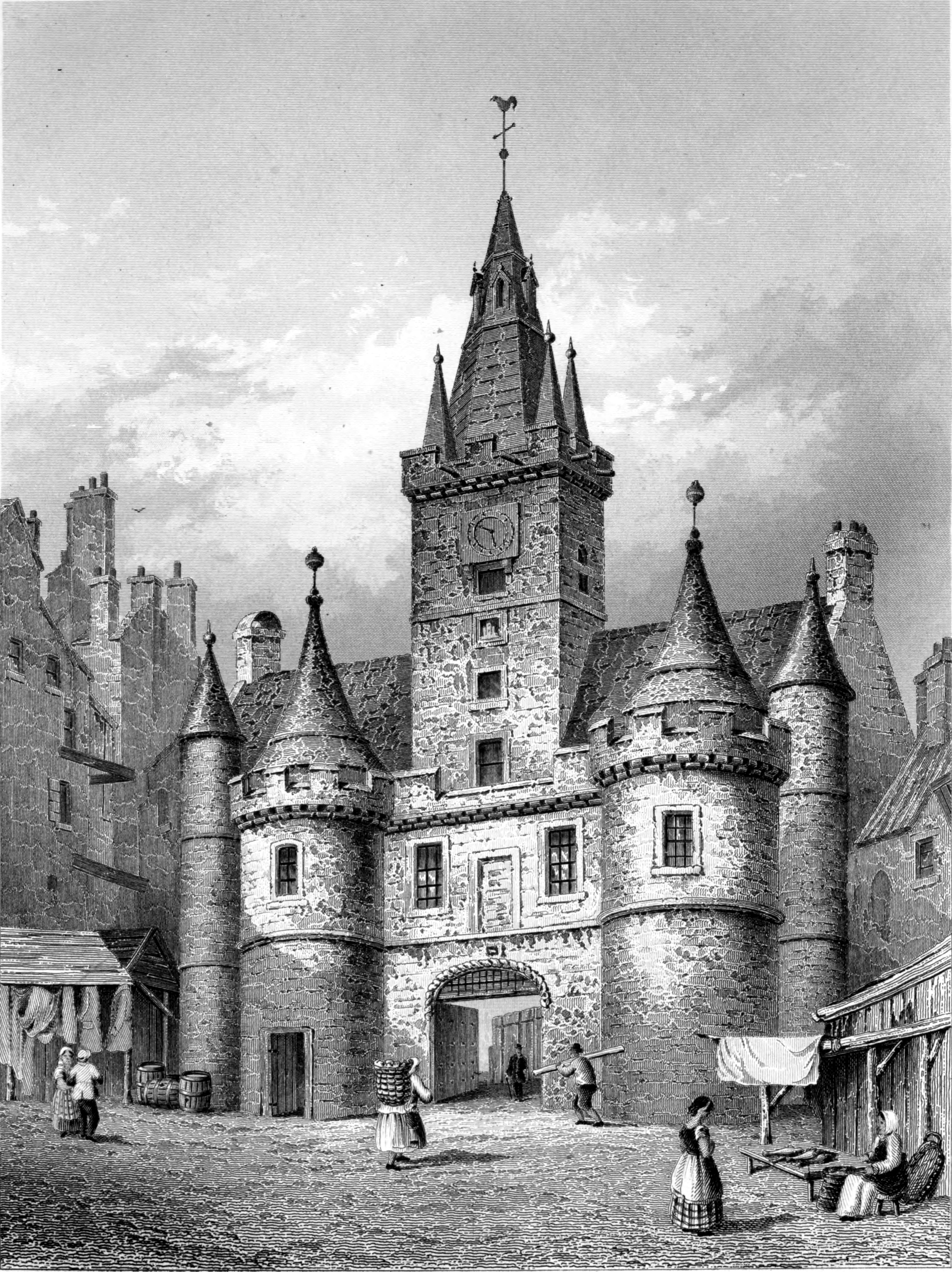
- The Netherbow Port

Orders
- Ordination: Clandestinely at Port of Menteith

Personal details
- Died: 14 August 1679 market-cross Edinburgh
- Denomination: Church of Scotland

John King (d. 14 August 1679) was a Scottish preacher who refused to follow the episcopal church of the King of England; he continued to preach as a Covenantor and was executed in 1679.

At one time King was chaplain to Lord Cardross, but he was seized by Claverhouse among the insurgents after the affair at Drumclog. He was taken to Edinburgh along with another preacher named John Kid. They were each subjected to torture, condemned to death, and executed. Following his death, King's head and limbs were displayed at the Netherbow Port on Edinburgh's Royal Mile beside James Guthrie's skull.

== Life ==
John King, an outlawed minister of the covenant, fills a somewhat marked place in the episode of Scottish history which includes the battle of Bothwell Bridge. He was domestic chaplain to Henry, 3rd Lord Cardross, and in 1674 was apprehended for keeping conventicles, with his lordship's connivance. On that occasion he was brought before the council, and held to bail, to appear when called upon. In May 1675 he was again arrested at Cardross house for the same offence, being seized in the nighttime, by a party of the guards under Sir Mungo Murray. Next day a number of country people assembled, from Menteith and Kippen, and rescued him from the military. Lord Cardross himself was absent from home at the time, but as soon as he heard of his chaplain's arrest, he applied to the Privy Council by petition, complaining of the illegal entrance into his house. The matter was remitted for enquiry to a committee of the council, who found that the rescue was made with Lord Cardross's acquiescence and connivance. He was therefore ordered to be imprisoned in Edinburgh castle, and fined £1,000 sterling, besides £1,350 Scots, for his tenants attending conventicles. An attempt was made to capture King at a conventicle near Cardross in June 1675. One man, Norrie, was killed defending the preacher who escaped.

Just previous to the affair at Drumclog in June 1679, King was, on 31 May, seized, with fourteen others, in the town of Hamilton, by Colonel Graham of Claverhouse. "There was some pretence," says Wodrow, "to seize King, being a vagrant preacher, and I think intercommuned, but there was no law for seizing the rest." Some escaping from Hamilton, took the direction of Loudoun Hill, where a large field-meeting was to be held. This led to the skirmish at Drumclog. At Hamilton, Claverhouse first heard of the meeting at Loudonhill, and on Sunday morning, June 1, he set out to disperse it, carrying King and the other prisoners along with him, bound two and two.

== After Drumclog ==
After the defeat of Claverhouse, the Covenanters pursued the king's troops for some distance, and liberated King and the other prisoners. King, making for Arran, was recaptured by stratagem on the estate of Blair, in the parish of Dalry, Ayrshire, shortly after the defeat of the covenanters at Bothwell, and was conveyed to Edinburgh. One of his escort of dragoons, being asked whither they were bound, is said to have answered, 'To carry King to hell.' The same day the dragoon was killed by the accidental discharge of his carbine.

== Trial ==
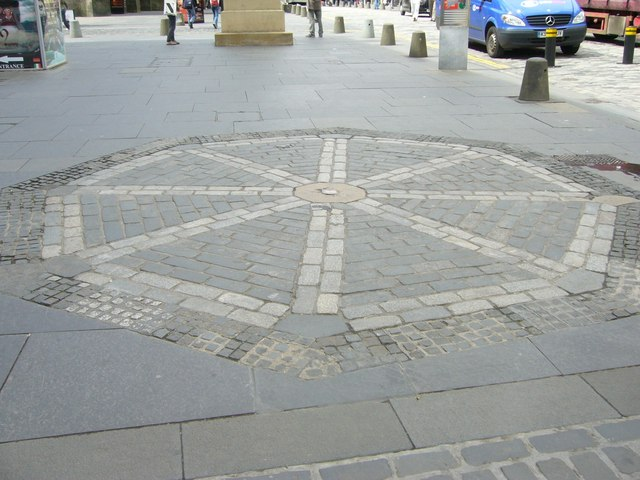
The location of the Cross between 1617 and 1756.

After the battle of Bothwell Bridge, King, with another preacher named Kid, was again apprehended, and brought to trial. King was brought before the council on 9 July 1679, along with John Kid. They pleaded that though found amongst the insurgents, they had taken no share in their proceedings, that they were in fact detained among them by force, that they had refused to preach to them, and, had seized the first opportunity of escaping before the battle. But all was of no avail. They were first subjected to the torture of the boots, and then condemned to death. After several appearances and a futile petition by counsel on their behalf, they were condemned.

== Hanging and mutilation ==
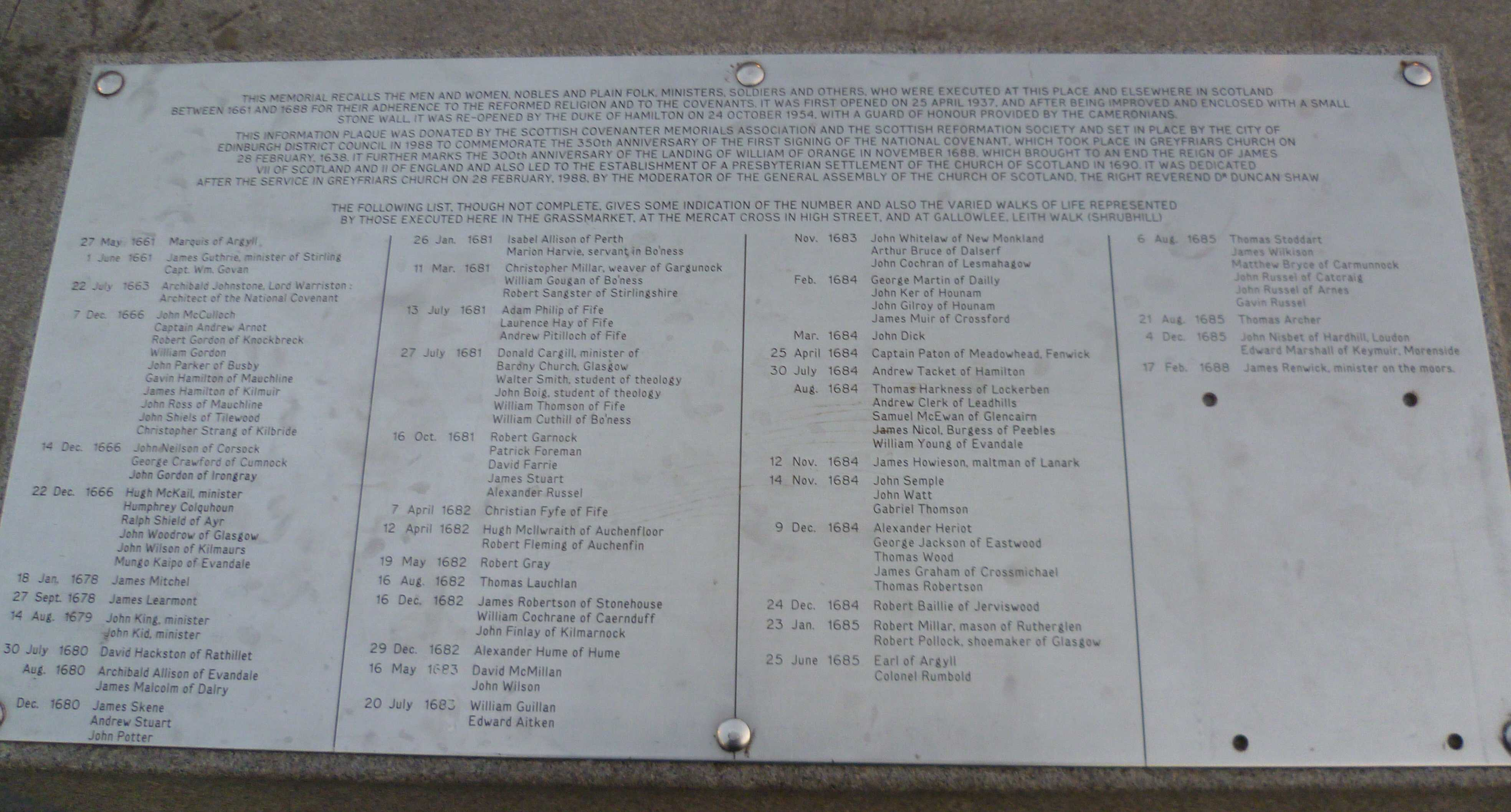
Plaque, Grassmarket

Proclamation was made immediately before the execution of an indulgence to the 'outed' ministers, and King and Kid were pressed by Robert Fleming the elder, then a fellow-prisoner, to signify their approval of it, which they resolutely declined to do. King and Kid were executed at the cross of Edinburgh on 14 August 1679. Following this, their heads and limbs being severed from their bodies and placed on the Nether Bow port.

== Works ==
King's last speech on the scaffold was printed. In it he makes mention of his wife and one child. The only sermon by him which is known to exist is included in the collection made by John Howie.

== Gabriel Kettledrummle ==
Sir Walter Scott's character Gabriel Kettledrummle in Old Mortality is supposed to be a distorted picture of John King. Thomson says: "John King may be supposed to be the prototype of the Rev. Gabriel Kettledrummle in the fiction of Scott. John Howie, in the appendix to the "Faithful Contendings", has given the notes of a sermon by King, and "Naphtali" contains his last speech before execution. The sermon is from the notes of a hearer, and so likely to be an imperfect rendering of what he said. It is, however, very far from being in the manner of Kettledrummle, and still less is this the case with his last speech, which is really worthy of the occasion, and says a great deal both for his tact, his ability, his piety, and his appreciative acquaintance with evangelical truth. The novelist, therefore, when he drew the portrait of the fanatic Covenanting preacher, drew from his powerful imagination, and certainly not from the facts known of the martyred John King."
