= Robert McGhee (cricketer) =

Australian cricketer (born 1963)

Personal information
- Born: 24 March 1963 (age 63); Richmond, Queensland, Australia
- Source: Cricinfo, 5 October 2020

Robert McGhee (born 24 March 1963) is an Australian cricketer. He played in four first-class matches for Queensland in 1990/91.

== See also ==
- List of Queensland first-class cricketers
