= Robert Howie (businessman) =

Scottish businessman

- Born: 1846
- Died: 1927 (aged 80–81)

Colonel Robert Howie, VD, JP, MA (1846–1927) was a prominent Glasgow businessman, the son of Hugh Howie, a successful iron merchant in the city.

Educated at the High School of Glasgow (Scotland's oldest school) and Glasgow University, Col. Howie spent all his commercial life at the iron merchants' firm of P. & R. Fleming & Co. on Argyle Street, of which he became senior partner.

Col. Howie took a deep interest in the Volunteers. He joined the 1st Lanark as a private in 1877, and four years later he transferred to the 3rd Lanark, receiving his commission as Lieutenant on 1 July 1881. In this Battalion he served for the long period of 24 years, and was in command of the regiment from January 1901, till January 1905, when his term of service as Commanding Officer having expired, he retired from the Volunteers. He was awarded the Volunteer Decoration by Queen Victoria and was appointed a justice of the peace.

Col. Howie also took a considerable interest in the affairs of the Trades' House. He joined the Incorporation of Hammermen in 1886. In 1902 he was elected a member of the Master Court, and three years later was appointed Collector. During his Collectorship 94 new members were enrolled, and the funds of the Incorporation were increased by £1,364. In 1908 he was elected Deacon of the Incorporation of Hammermen - the senior Incorporation (or 'Premier' craft) within the Trades' House of Glasgow.

He was also a member of the Merchants' House, a Director and past President of the Glasgow Ayrshire Society, and served two terms as a Director of the Glasgow Agricultural Society. For several years he was also Chairman of the Glasgow Conservative Club.

== Sources ==
Who's Who in Glasgow, 1909
