= John Kid =

Scottish Presbyterian chaplain (d. 1679)

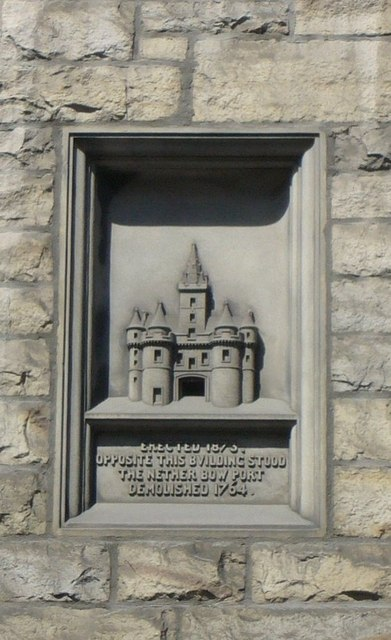
- The Netherbow Port

Personal details
- Born: John Kid or Kidd
- Died: 14 August 1679 market-cross Edinburgh
- Denomination: Church of Scotland

John Kid (d. August 14, 1679) was a Scottish preacher who refused to follow the episcopal church of the King of England; he continued to preach as a Covenantor and was executed for treason in 1679.

He was seized by Claverhouse among the insurgents after the Battle of Drumclog. He was released by the insurgents but was recaptured three weeks later at the Battle of Bothwell Bridge with a sword in his belt. Kid was taken to Edinburgh along with another preacher named John King. They were each subjected to torture, condemned to death, and executed for treason. Following his death Kid's head and limbs were displayed at the Netherbow Port on Edinburgh's Royal Mile; these were placed beside the skull of James Guthrie, another Covenanter who had been executed for treason 18 years earlier.

== Life ==
John Kid was a Presbyterian minister of the National Covenant of 1638 in opposition to reforms to the Church of Scotland proposed by King Charles I. Together with fellow Covenanter John King he was taken prisoner by government forces after the battle of Bothwell Bridge which took place on 22 June 1679.

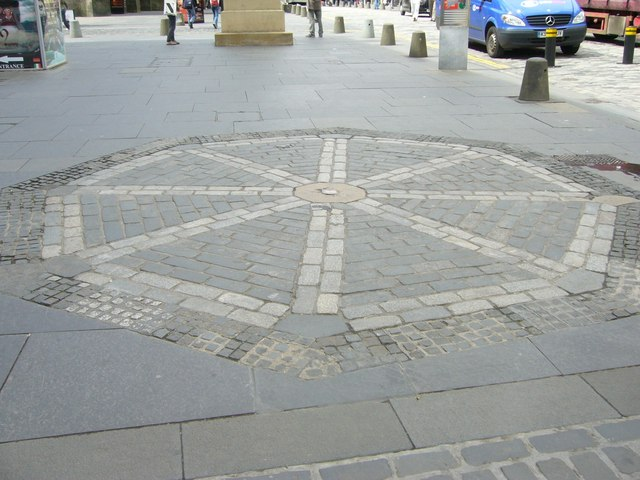
The location of the Cross between 1617 and 1756.

Kid was brought before the council on 9 July 1679, along with John King. They pleaded that though found amongst the insurgents, they had taken no share in their proceedings, that they were in fact detained among them by force, that they had refused to preach to them, and, had seized the first opportunity of escaping before the battle. Howie said: "Whether he had ever been ordained, or was only a probationer, we have not discovered. If he was, it must have been shortly previous to the engagement at which he was taken, and his presence at which was deemed sufficient to infer the highest penalty. He was strictly examined as to the origin of the rising, and his answers not being satisfactory, he was questioned by torture with the boot. The torture revealled nothing. He was thereafter indicted, along with Mr. King, for having been in the rebellion, and for having preached at field conventicles."

At their trial, on 28 July, they had claimed that they were conventicle preachers, but so far from being disloyal rebels, they advised the armed brethren to return 'to loyalty and Christianitie.' Kid further pleaded that Monmouth had given him quarter, and that he carried a short sword merely to disguise himself from being known as a preacher.

== Hanging and mutilation ==
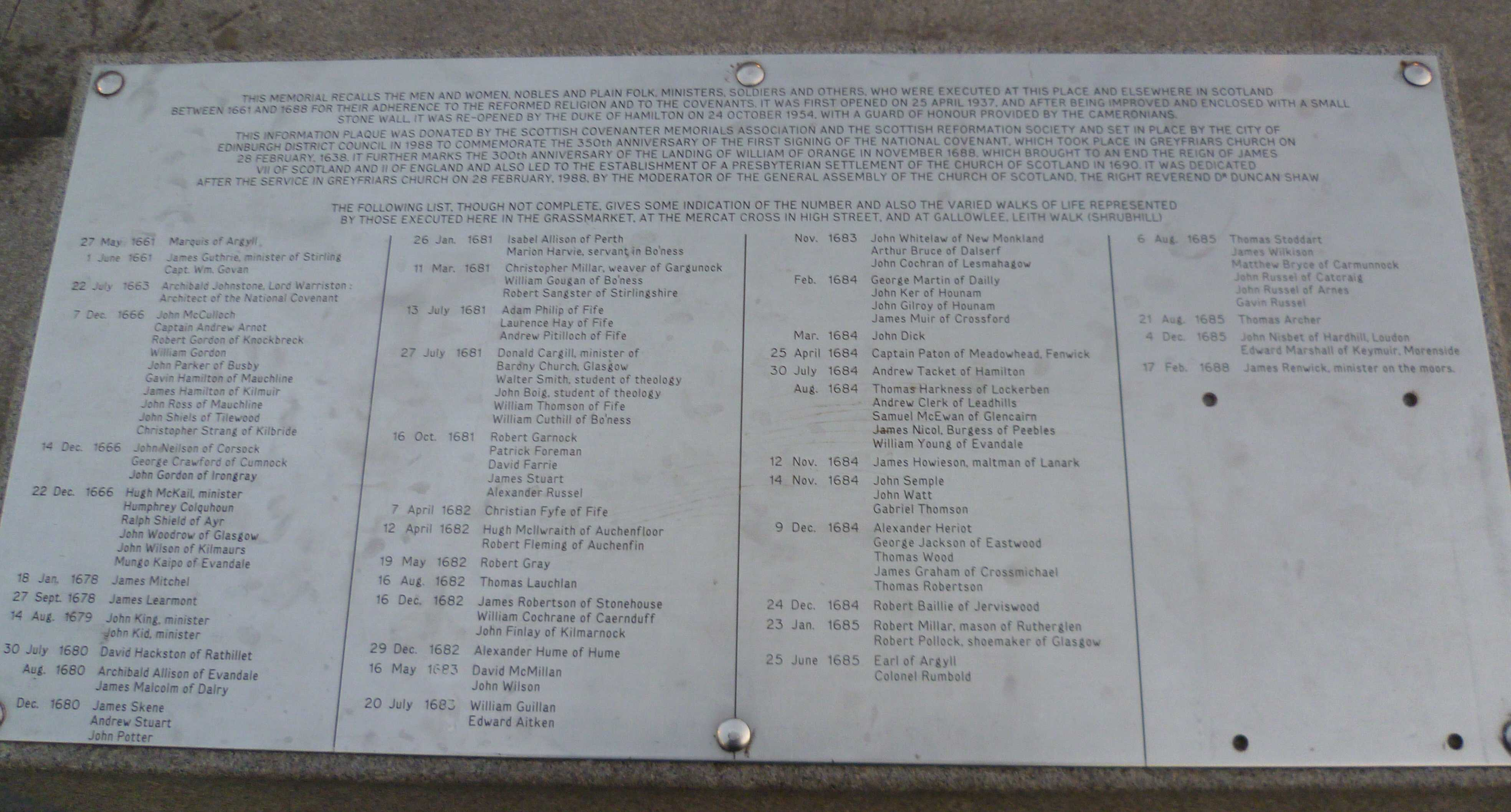
Plaque, Grassmarket

Proclamation was made immediately before the execution of an indulgence to the ‘outed’ ministers, and Kid and King were pressed by Robert Fleming the elder, then a fellow-prisoner, to signify their approval of it, which they resolutely declined to do. King and Kid were executed at the cross of Edinburgh on 14 August 1679. Following this, their heads and limbs being severed from their bodies and placed on the Nether Bow port.

== Works ==
Kid's last speech on the scaffold was printed.
