= James Wood (university principal) =

Scottish Presbyterian divine (d1664)

- Professor of Divinity and Principal of the Old College, St. Andrews

Personal details
- Died: 15 March 1664
- Denomination: Presbyterian Church of Scotland
- Spouse: (1) Catherine (2) Anna
- Education: University of St Andrews

James Wood was a Covenanter and Church of Scotland minister. He was appointed to be Professor of Divinity and Principal of the Old College, St. Andrews by Cromwell's government. He was deposed after the Restoration under the influence of Archbishop Sharp in 1663. He was then holding Presbyterian principles at a time when Charles II was promoting Prelacy. He died in 1664.

== Life ==
James Wood was the son of a merchant. He was educated at St Andrews. After study he became a Regent in the Old College there. He was ordained to the ministry of the church in 1640. He married Catherine Carstares on Thursday 7 January 1641 and therefore became the brother-in-law of John Carstares.

James Wood was admitted minister of Dunino in 1641. In 1644, Wood was elected Professor of Divinity in Marischal College and minister of Greyfriars, Aberdeen, but not settled. He was then translated, in July 1645, to be professor of Ecclesiastical History in St Mary's or New College, St Andrews, of which Mr Samuel Rutherford was Principal.

He was sent by the Assembly in 1650 to wait upon Charles II at Breda. The Treaty of Breda was signed by the king in 1650.

He became Provost of St Salvator's College at the University of St Andrews in 1657. Wood, like Samuel Rutherford, had declined to become a Professor unless he were allowed to continue his work in the pulpit. Both were associated with Robert Blair and Andrew Honeyman in the ministry of St. Andrews. Their labours were unremitting. During the Commonwealth every minister was expected to preach three times a week, and to lecture and catechise once. According to Baillie, the differences between him and Rutherford on the subject of the Public Resolutions rendering his situation very uncomfortable, he was desirous of being removed, and, in 1657, was translated to be Principal of St Salvadors, or the old College of St Andrews. His appointment to this office by the university was owing to Cromwell's government, which, by the advice of James, afterwards Archbishop Sharp, wrote a letter to the ministers of St Andrews, and the masters of the university, requiring them to admit Wood as Principal of the Old College without delay. Baillie in recording this appointment says, "I am glad he is in it, or any other 'charge' where he is contented; for indeed he is the most serviceable man our church now has." On the establishment of Prelacy after the restoration of Charles II., Sharp did all he could to induce Wood to conform; and finding his efforts utterly ineffectual, he soon effected his removal from St Andrews. By his instigation Wood was summoned before the Privy Council in July 1663; and appearing, his place was declared vacant, while he was ordered to confine himself within the city of Edinburgh. He was, however, afterwards permitted to return to St Andrews to visit his father who had fallen sick. He died about the beginning of the year 1664. Sharp visited him once or twice on his death-bed in St Andrews; and, though Wood spoke very little to him, and never at all about the introduced ecclesiastical changes, he circulated a report, that, in the prospect of eternity, Wood professed an entire indifference as to the subject of Church government, and that it might be altered according to the will of the magistrate. Wood, deeply grieved on hearing this report, dictated and subscribed a solemn testimony, before two witnesses and a notary, in which he declares it as his dying conviction, that Presbyterian government was the ordinance of God, appointed by Jesus Christ for governing and ordering his visible Church.

== Death ==
James Wood died on 15 March 1664, aged about 55.

== Family ==
He married:

- (1) Catherine (died 9 September 1658, aged 38), daughter of James Carstairs, merchant, St Andrews, and had issue —
  - William; John, minister of St Andrews; Katherine (married John Lentran); Agnes (married William, eldest son of Walter Fairfowl of Lathallan Wester); They had three other sons and four other daughters
- (2) 30 June 1659, Anna, second daughter of John Napier or Lepar, provost of St Andrews

== Works ==
He is said to have left some very valuable manuscripts, particularly a complete refutation of the Arminian scheme of doctrine.

- A Vindication of the Freedom and Lawfulness, and so of the Authority of the late General Assembly, etc. 1652.
- A Little Stone pretended to be out of the mountain, tried, and found to be a counterfeit, Etc. Edinburgh, 1654. - A reply by Wood to " A Little Stone out of the Mountain, or Church Order briefly opened," by Nicholas Lockyer, an Independent, who accompanied the English army to Scotland in the time of Cromwell.
- Pamphlet bearing the title of "Protesters no Subverters, etc." Edinburgh, 1659

== Bibliography ==
- Fife Sasines, xix., 1
- General Register of Inhibitions, 13 June 1672
- General Register of Hornings., 4 Dec. 1671
