= Reverend Angus McBean =

Scottish Presbyterian minister (1656-1689)

Angus McBean

Personal details
- Born: 1656
- Died: 1689 (aged 32–33)
- Denomination: Presbyterian (Church of Scotland)
- Spouse: Janet Trent
- Education: King's College, Aberdeen

Angus McBean, or as he was otherwise known by his family Æneas McBean was a Scottish minister and Covenanter. He was the last Presbyterian minister deposed under Episcopacy.

== Early life and education ==
Angus McBean, born was born in 1656. He was of the family of Kinchyle. McBean was educated at King's College, Aberdeen, graduation with an M.A. on 13 July 1675. He was the session-clerk at Foveran from 23 December 1677 to February 1678. In church records he is noted to have been licensed (on the recommendation of Professor Menzies of Aberdeen) and officiated for a time in Ayrshire. He is recorded to have been presented by Thomas Fraser of Strichen in October, had a certificate for ordination dated 28 November, and was ordained and installed on 29 December 1683. Becoming doubtful as to Episcopacy, he "inveighed against the sins and errors of his time, particularly against Popery, with great judgment, zeal, and boldness," and on 23 October 1687, he preached a memorable sermon (from Job xxxiv.,31, 32) in which he recanted his former opinions and demitted his charge, "some of his hearers being angry, and some surprised, but those who received most good of his ministry were all in tears." He now actively joined the Presbyterians and conducted services in private houses and in the open air, and, returning to Inverness, gathered round him a large congregation.

== Legal trouble ==
Having gone to Edinburgh, he was apprehended, brought before the Privy Council, and after a brief term of imprisonment (from 1 December) was permitted to return home, Duncan Forbes of Culloden giving bail to a large amount that he would answer when called. In February 1688 he received a second summons to appear before the Council on six days' notice. Though in feeble health, and the cold intense, he hastened to Edinburgh and reported himself a few hours before his bail expired. He was handed over to an ecclesiastical court, consisting of Arthur, Archbishop of St Andrews, and eight clerical coadjutors. Boldly avowing his change of creed and refusing to return to Episcopacy, he was deposed and committed to the Tolbooth, where he lay for most of the year, Forbes of Culloden and Sir Robert Gordon of Gordonstoun, Bart., vainly offering 10,000 merks (£555, lis. Id.) for his release.

== Liberation, death and legacy ==
In December the prison was broken open by a party of Presbyterian sympathisers and he was set at liberty, but the rigours of imprisonment had so told on his constitution that he died within two months, in February 1689. He was the last Presbyterian minister to be deposed under Episcopacy. William Stuart of Kiltearn describes him as "a man of great judgment, excellent learning, and in his own opinion less than the least of all saints, but in the judgment of those who had the best discerning, a man who grew in grace and in the knowledge of the Lord Jesus Christ, to a more than ordinary degree."

He is mentioned on the gravestone of his granddaughter Grizel Fraser, which is in the Old Chapel Yard Cemetery of Inverness; the inscription of which reads:

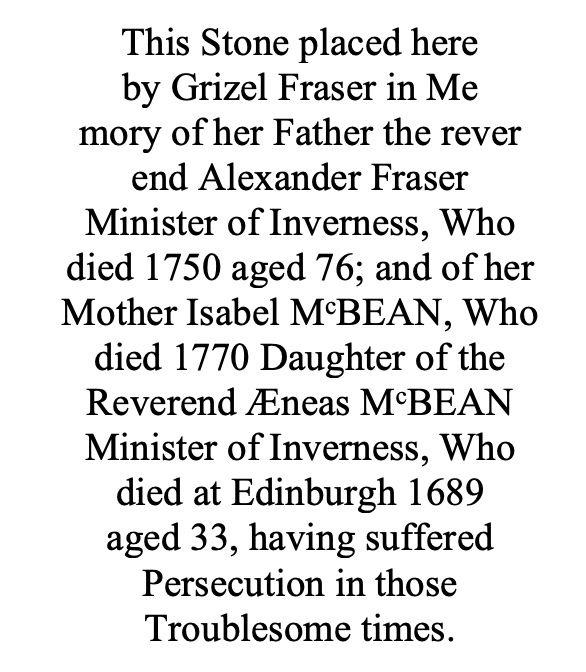
Transcription of the gravestone erected by Grizel Fraser in memory of her parents, in the Old Chapel Yard Cemetery, Inverness

He left behind a son and daughter. The son was Reverend Alexander McBean who followed his father into the Church, and became a well-known Minister of Inverness. It is words in the Will and Testament of Rev. Æneas's granddaughter Grizel Fraser that confirms with certainty this father and son relationship: ... to my Cousin and friend Mrs Jean MacBean alias White relict of the deceased Valentine White Esqr.... 'Jean MacBean alias White' is mentioned in her father William Macbean of Ball Court, Cornhill, City of London and of Roaring River Estate in Jamaica: To my daughter Mrs Waite (sic) i.e. 'White'... and he also mentions To my Brother fforbes.

== Family ==
He married Janet, daughter of William Trent, merchant, Inverness (she married (2) Robert Baillie, minister of Second Charge, Inverness after Angus' death), and had issue —

- Reverend Alexander McBean, nicknamed the John Knox of the North (born c.1684, died 2 November 1762 aged 78), Minister of Inverness 1720-1762. Ordained at Rosemarkie 4 June 1712, as Minister of Avoch. Mr Alex. McBain Minister of Avoch married Marjory McBean, dau of John McBean of Inverness, on 25th Sept 1712 at Inverness. Marjory was born in 1679 – the Old Parish Register of Inverness recording this reads: 8 day of November 1679 - That day John Mcbaine Sone to Wm Mcbaine had a child baptized named Majorie, Gillies Mcbaine of Drakes Donald McPherson ... Angus McIntosh of Holme & Malcolm Fraser of ... witnesses. A transcription of their gravestone in the Chapel Yard cemetery, Inverness reads: Underneath this stone are deposited the remains of Alexander Macbean, who died 2d day of November, 1762, aged 78 years, and in the 50th of his ministery, the last 42 years of which was at Inverness. Here are also the remains of Marjory Macbean, his spouse, who died March 30th, 1766, aged 86 years. There were seven children of the marriage, six sons and one daughter. The youngest and only surviving son erected this tombstone in grateful remembrance of the best of parents. This youngest surviving son was General Forbes Macbean; the other brother who survived and died before him was William Macbean of Ball Court, Cornhill and Roaring River Estate, Jamaica.
- Isobel McBean (married Reverend Alexander Fraser, Minister of the Second Charge, Inverness)

== Bibliography ==
- Wodrow's History, iv., 524
- Mackay's Urquhart, 368
- Fountainhall's Decisions, i., 488
- Brodie's Diary
- Shaw's Hist., iii., 435
- Foveran Session Records
- Mackintoshes and Clan Chattan, 489
- Covenanters of Moray and Ross, 164-9
- Tombstone
- More Culloden Papers, i., 201
