= John Paton (Covenanter) =

Scottish Presbyterian soldier (died 1684)

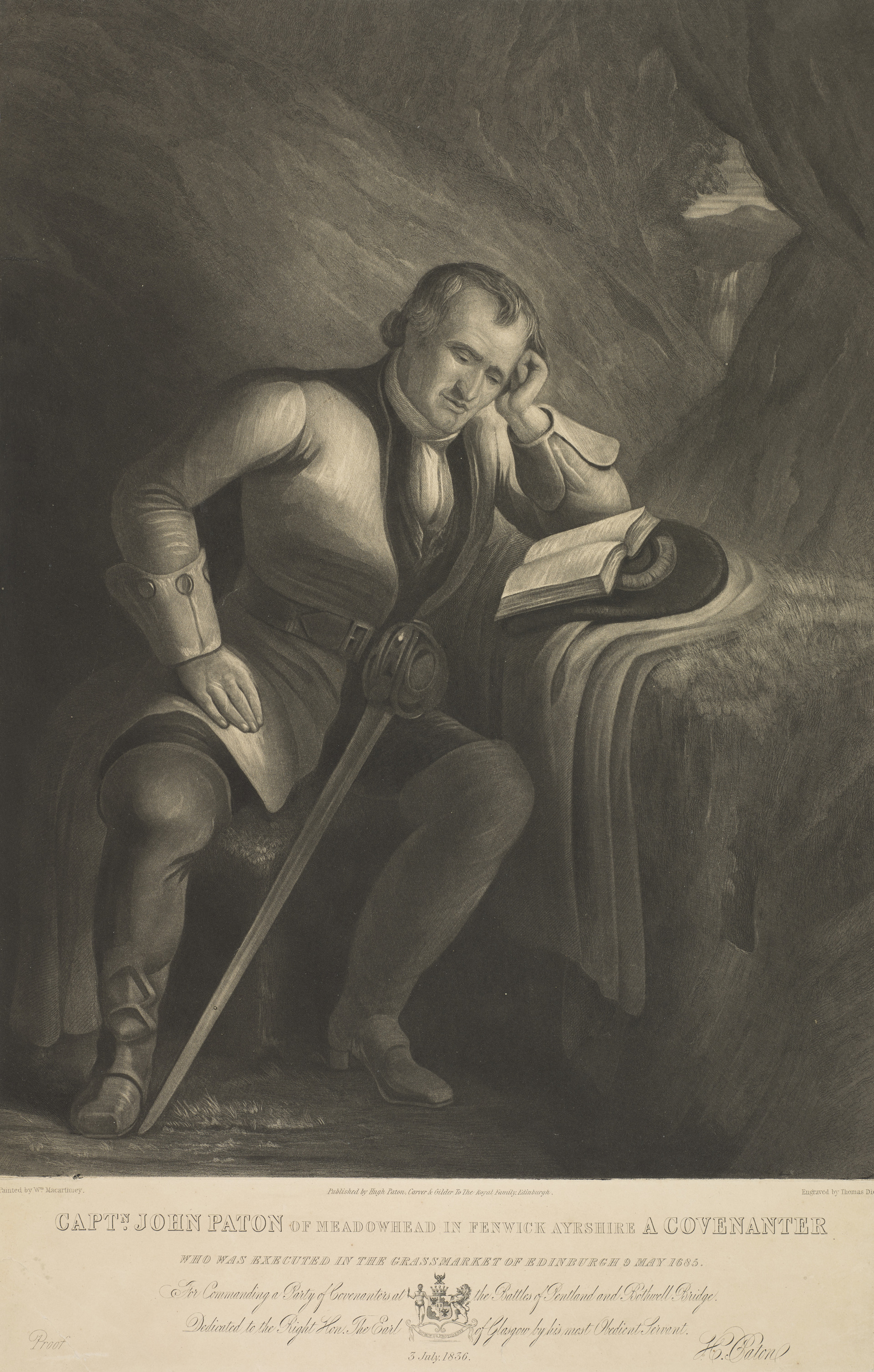
- John Paton with two swords
- Born: Meadowhead, Fenwick
- Died: 9 May 1684 (executed); Grassmarket, Edinburgh
- Burial place: Greyfriars Kirkyard
- Military career
- Rank: Captain
- Conflicts: Thirty Years' War; Battle of Lützen (1632); Wars of the Three Kingdoms; Battle of Marston Moor; Battle of Kilsyth; Battle of Philiphaugh; Battle of Worcester; Battle of Rullion Green; Battle of Bothwell Bridge

John Paton was a Scottish soldier and Covenanter. He was executed at the Grassmarket on 9 May 1684 largely for his actions at the Battle of Bothwell Bridge.

== Life ==
James Paton was a Covenanter. He was born at Meadowhead in the parish of Fenwick, Ayrshire, where his father had a farm. Until near manhood he was employed in agricultural pursuits. According to one account he went as a volunteer to Germany, and served with such distinction in the wars of Gustavus Adolphus that he was raised to the rank of captain. According to another, he was present with the Scots army at Marston Moor. With the rank of captain, he fought with great gallantry against Montrose at Kilsyth, 15 August 1645, and escaped uninjured during the flight. After the defeat of Montrose at Philiphaugh on 13 September he returned home to Fenwick. He took part with the people of Fenwick in opposing General Middleton in 1648. With other Scottish Covenanters he, however, supported the king against Cromwell in 1650 and, accompanying him in 1651 into England, fought for him at the battle of Worcester on 3 September. After the Restoration he fought, in command of a party of covenanting cavalry, on 28 September 1666, at Rullion Green, where he had a personal encounter with Thomas Dalyell. He was also at the battle of Bothwell Bridge 22 June 1679. He was excepted out of the indemnities passed after both battles, but succeeded in lurking safely in various hiding places, until in 1684 he was taken in the house of a covenanter, Robert Howie. Dalyell on meeting him is said to have stated that he was both glad and sorry for him. The fact that he had fought for the king at Worcester atoned in Dalyell's eyes for much that was unjustifiable in his subsequent behaviour. He severely rebuked an insult that was offered him, and is supposed to have exerted special influence to procure his pardon. Lauder of Fountainhall mentions that Paton ‘carried himself very discreetly before the justices’ (Historical Notices, p. 535).

== Death ==
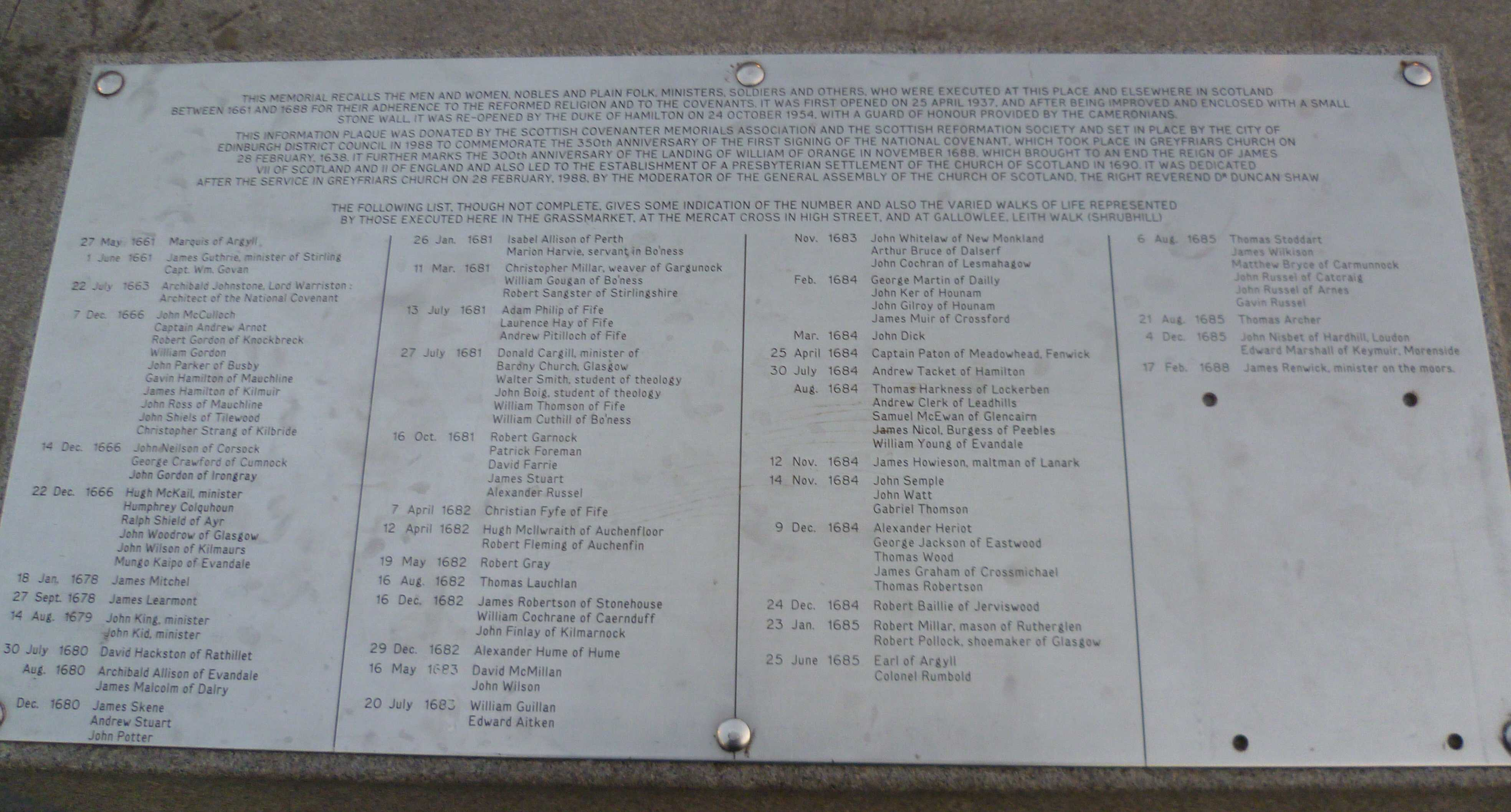
Plaque, Grassmarket

He was sentenced to be hanged at the Grassmarket on 23 April, but was reprieved till 9 May. He was then willing to have taken the test, but a quorum of the Privy Council could not be obtained to reprieve him. He was buried in Greyfriars Kirkyard, Edinburgh. There is a large monument to John Paton in Fenwick Churchyard.

== Family ==
He married (1) Janet Lindsay, around 1652, (2) Janet Millar around November 1666 and has issue before she died "in or after 1684". They had 6 children.

== In Poetry ==
James Dodds, a minister from Dunbar wrote a poem called "Meeting Of General Dalziel And Captain John Paton Of Meadowhead, When the Latter was brought Prisoner to Edinburgh, August, 1684." The first two verses are:

John Paton's sword and Bible

Hath his good sword her temper lost,
Or her master now forsaken?
Or why, such wars and dangers passed,
Is he a captive taken?
Nay, nay! his arm is powerful yet,
His sword as keen as ever;
But he is life-worn, and would fain
That God should him deliver.

The same that won his maiden scars
At Lutzen, famed in story;
And since, in every hard campaign,
Hath shared the toil and glory.
But chiefly to his native land
His heart and sword were given;
That she might keep her ancient rights
And her covenant with heaven.
...

== Bibliography ==
- Howie's Scots Worthies
- Wodrow's Sufferings of the Church of Scotland
- Lauder of Fountainhall's Historical Notices in the Bannatyne Club
