= Robert McGhee (minister) =

Pioneer of evangelical movement and church of Scotland minister

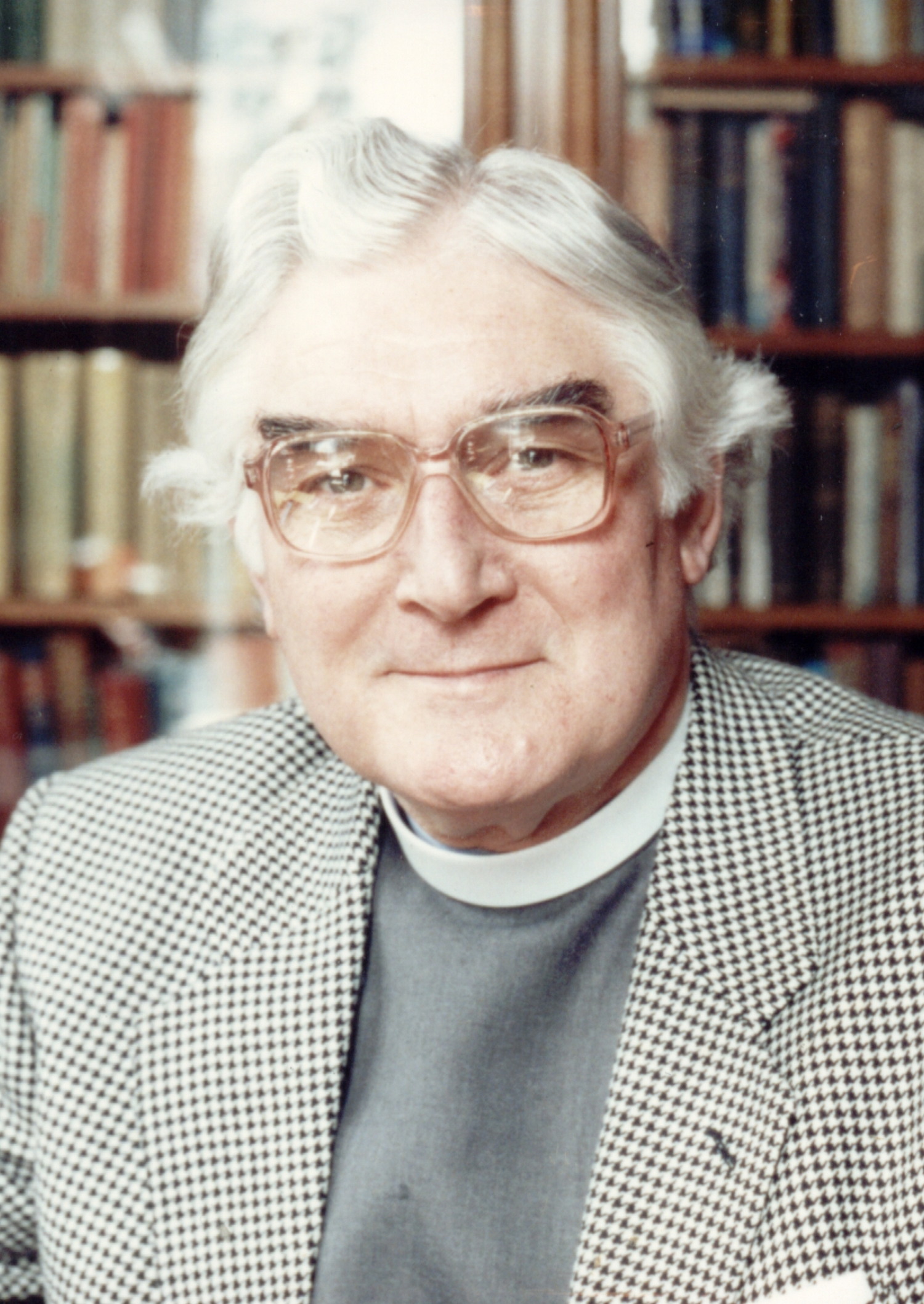
- The Revd Dr Robert McGhee
- Born: 29 July 1929; Port Glasgow, Renfrewshire, Scotland, UK
- Died: 18 March 1996; Falkirk, Scotland, UK
- Occupation(s): Church of Scotland Minister and Evangelist
- Spouse: Mary Stevenson Cunningham
- Children: Mary Jane Walker; Robert Andrew Ferguson; Kathryn
- Parent(s): Robert McGhee; Catherine Hawthorn Ferguson

Robert McGhee was a prominent Church of Scotland minister who championed the evangelical movement in Scotland throughout the second half of the 20th century. He was a signatory of the Manila Manifesto and was nominated for the position of Moderator several times. He was head of the Church's Board of Social Responsibility (one of the Church's six councils, and the largest voluntary provider of social care in Scotland) during the 1980s.

== Background and education ==
McGhee was born in Port Glasgow, Renfrewshire, on 29 July 1929, the first son of Robert McGhee (who had set up various missions and Sunday Schools in some of Glasgow's most deprived areas) and Catherine Hawthorn Ferguson. He served two years in the Royal Air Force before training as an accountant. In 1954 he went up to Glasgow University to study Divinity and took his BD from Trinity College, Glasgow. Here he was influenced by William Barclay and was a contemporary of Revd Douglas Alexander, father of Cabinet minister Douglas Alexander and Leader of the Scottish Labour Party Wendy Alexander.

== Ministry ==
He was ordained in Port Glasgow and inducted to Pultneytown St. Andrew’s Church in Wick, Caithness in 1959 as 9th minister of Wick. After a successful merge with another local church, he was minister of Wick St. Andrew’s and Thrumster Church from 1961 to 1966. From 1966 to 1972 he was 1st minister of Mayfield and Easthouses Church in Dalkeith outside Edinburgh, before moving finally to Falkirk, as 8th minister of St. Andrew's West Parish Church. During his time in Falkirk, he was appointed president of the Scottish Evangelistic Council (1982–1985), convener of Community Care (1977–1985) and then convener of the Board of Social Responsibility of the Church of Scotland (1985–1989). As convener he visited Kenya as part of the International Christian Federation Conference for the Prevention of Alcoholism and Drug Addiction, and also toured the Holy Land. As convener he was responsible for the reports presented to Margaret Thatcher after her notorious Sermon on the Mound in 1988, which were interpreted as a rebuke to her speech.

He also served as chairman of the Lord’s Day Observance Society of Scotland (1970–1974) and moderator of the Presbyteries of Caithness (1964–1965), Falkirk (1983–1983) and the Synod of Forth (1985–1986). In 1991 he was appointed chairman of the Glasgow Council for Billy Graham’s Scottish crusade.

Addressing the General Assembly, the Queen's representative to the Church and the prime minister, Edward Heath

Dr. McGhee made various television and radio appearances, often presenting "Late Call" on ITV, and was one of the most frequent speakers at the General Assemblies, taking a conservative, evangelical stance on theological issues. He was also on the Editorial Board for CH4 (the fourth Edition of the Church Hymnary). He was awarded an honorary Doctorate of Divinity. He was the nomination of the Church's powerful evangelical wing for the position of Moderator on several occasions, but was unsuccessful.

Dr. McGhee died on 18 March 1996 in Stirlingshire, of cancer. At his funeral the church was overflowing with over 1500 mourners, and he was buried in Falkirk Cemetery. The Very Revd Sandy McDonald (father of Doctor Who actor David Tennant) preached at his funeral. Dr. McGhee's family donated hundreds of theological books which were part of his private collection to the University of Glasgow. A stained glass window of St. John was erected in his memory in St. Andrew’s West Church, and a new residential street built in 2005 in central Falkirk, McGhee Place, was named after him.

Church of Scotland titles
Preceded by The Revd John Robertson	9th Minister of Wick; Later Wick St. Andrew's and Thrumster; 1959-1966	Succeeded by The Revd Alexander Gunn
Preceded by	Moderator of the Presbytery of Caithness; 1964-1965	Succeeded by
New title	1st Minister of Mayfield and Easthouses; 1966-1972	Succeeded by
Preceded by The Revd Robert Pollock	8th Minister of Falkirk St. Andrew's; Later Falkirk St. Andrew's West; 1972-1996	Succeeded by The Revd Alistair Horne
Preceded by	Moderator of the Presbytery of Falkirk; 1983-1984	Succeeded by
Preceded by	Moderator of the Synod of Forth; 1985-1986	Succeeded by
Non-profit organization positions
Preceded by	Chairman of the Lord's Day Observance Society of Scotland; 1970-1974	Succeeded by
Preceded by	President of the Scottish Evangelistic Council; 1982-1985	Succeeded by

== See also ==
- General Assembly of the Church of Scotland
- McGhee Family
