= Robert Garnock =

Scottish covenanter

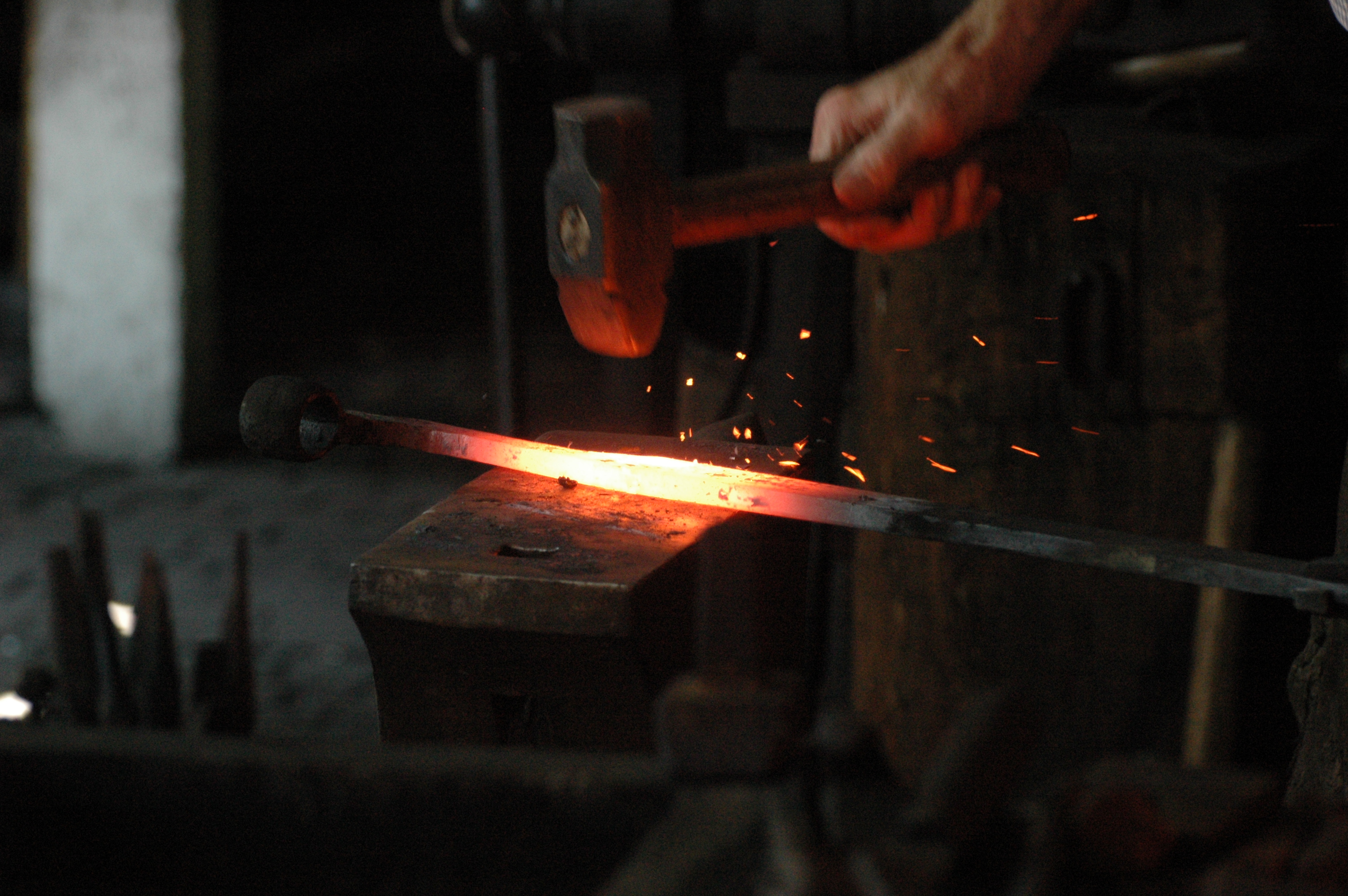
- Stirling Hammerman

Religious life
- Religion: Christianity
- School: Presbyterianism

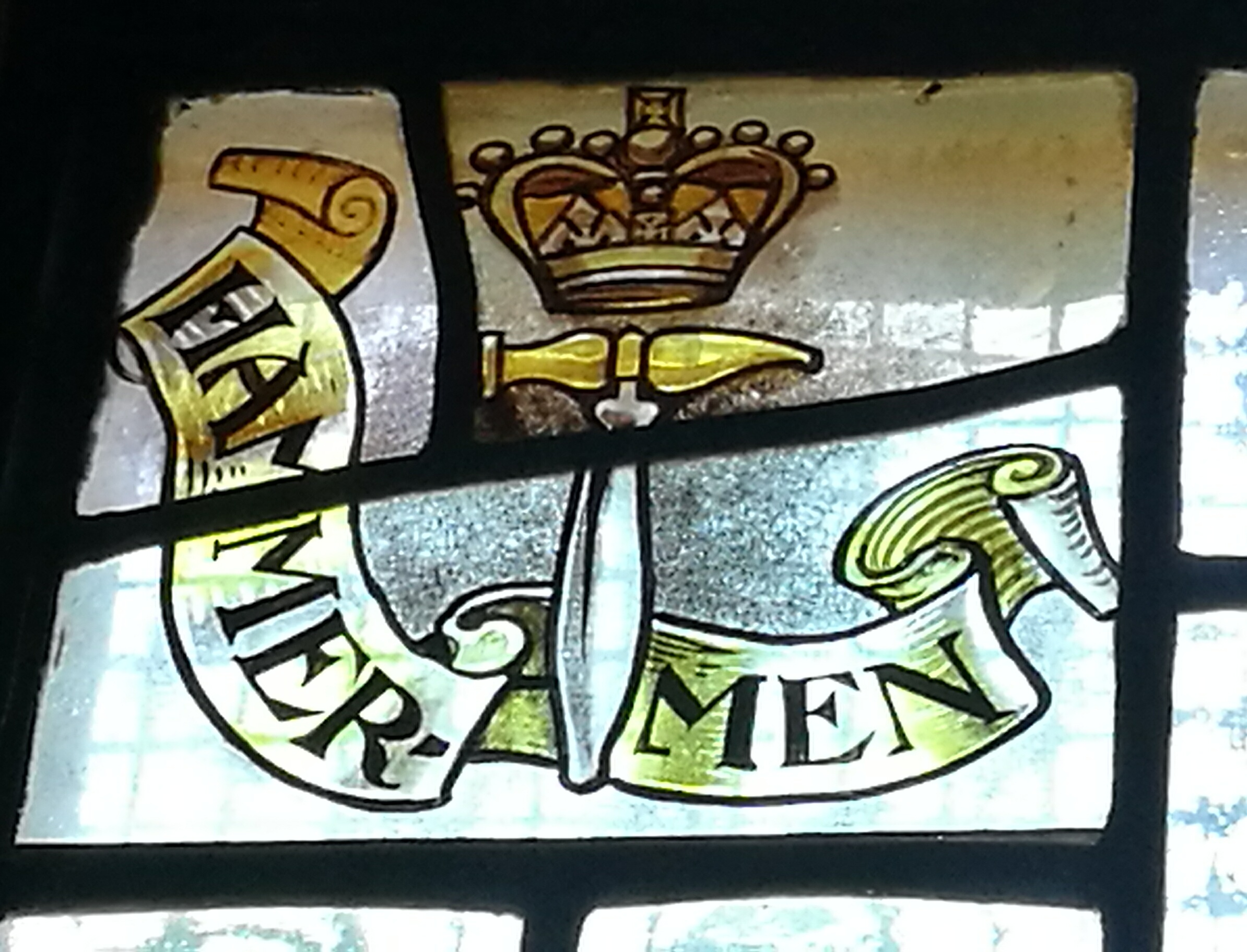
Stirling, 8-10 Corn Exchange Road - Incorporated Trades stained glass panel Hammermen

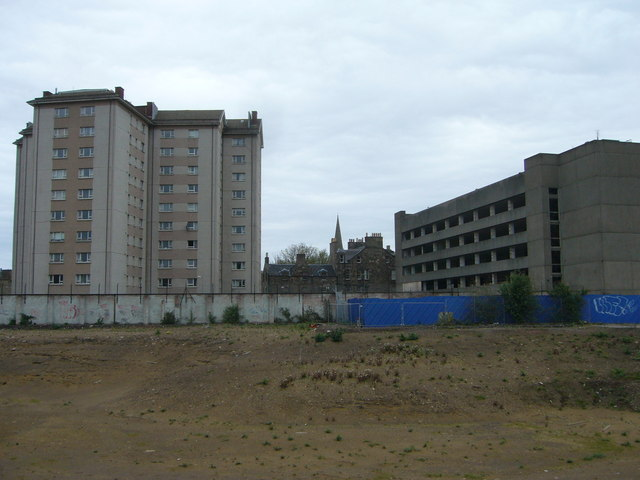
Hole in the ground, Shrubhill, site of Gallow Lee.

Robert Garnock (c. 1660 – 1681) was a Scottish Covenanter. He was baptised by James Guthrie and like him was hanged in Edinburgh although at a different time and place; Guthrie was executed about 20 years before Garnock.

== Early life ==
Garnock was a native of Stirling, the son of a blacksmith there. He followed the same occupation. He is known to have been paid for a sluice which formed part of the defences of the town. After the restoration of episcopacy in Scotland in 1662, Garnock frequented the Presbyterian conventicles. Being required in 1678 to take arms on behalf of the government, he declined, and was obliged to leave Stirling to avoid imprisonment. He went to Glasgow, Falkirk, Bo'ness and other towns, pursuing his calling as he could find opportunity; but, returning to Stirling, took part in a skirmish with dragoons at Ballyglass, near Fintry, on 18 May 1679. This took place at one of Archibald Riddle's conventicles. Unknown to the soldiers several of Archbishop Sharp's killers were present at the conventicle.

== Capture and imprisonment ==
On attempting to re-enter Stirling after the fight he was apprehended and thrown into prison, where he lay until in July 1680 he was removed with a number of other prisoners to Edinburgh, and confined in the Greyfriars churchyard. Here in a small walled-in piece of ground nearly fifteen hundred prisoners were strictly warded, most of whom had been taken after the battle of Bothwell, and among these Garnock exerted himself to prevent them taking the 'test.'

== Trial ==
He was removed on 25 October 1680 for judicial examination, and, on declining to answer certain incriminatory questions, was incarcerated in the Tolbooth of Edinburgh. Here he remained, refusing all overtures for compliance, until 7 October 1681, when he was tried before the privy council, and for declining the king's authority was found guilty of treason, and condemned to be executed along with some of his fellows on the 10th of the same month.

== Last speech, execution and burial ==
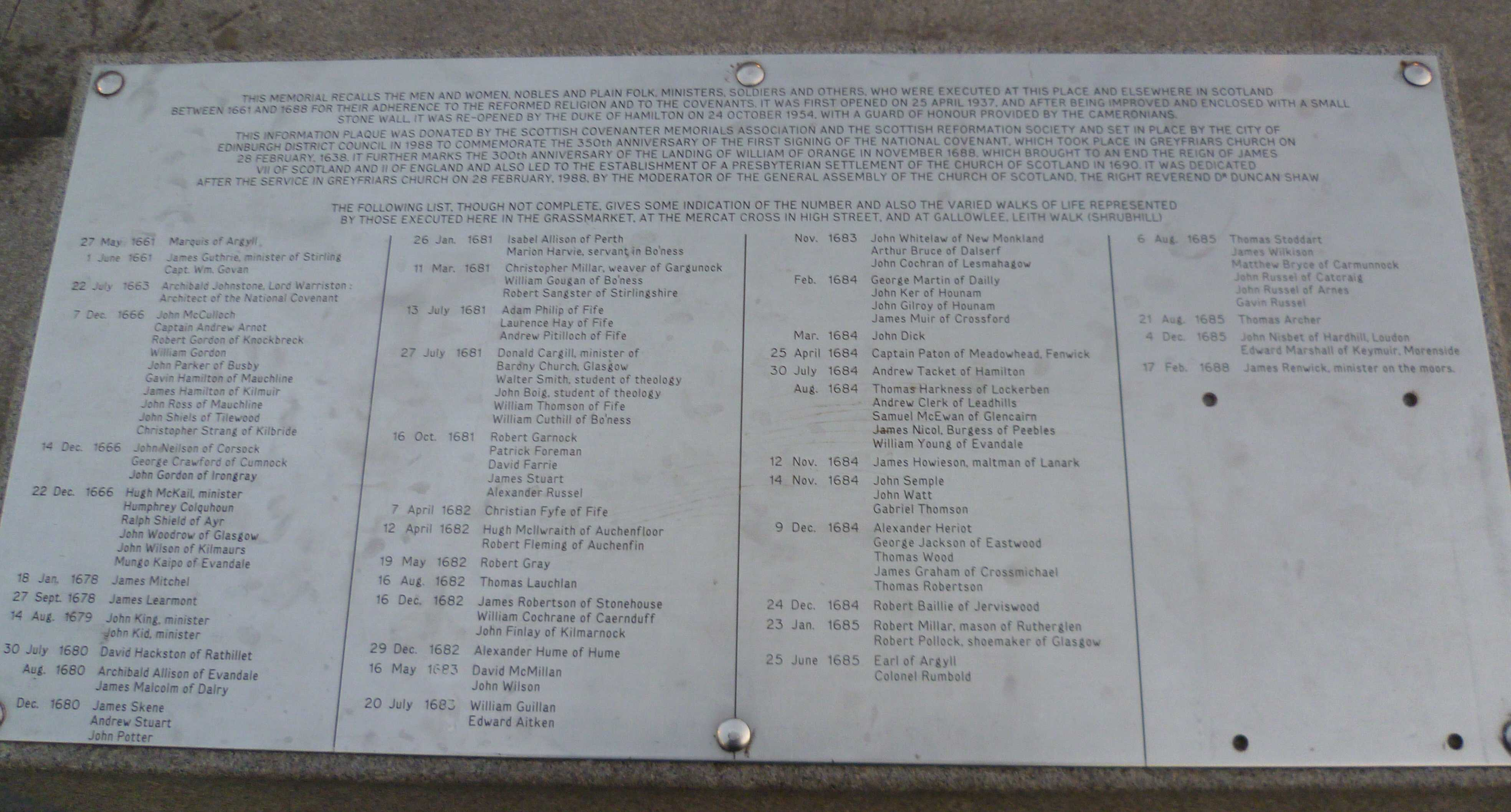
Covenanters Plaque, Grassmarket

The sentence was carried out at the Gallowlee (now the Pilrig junction), between Edinburgh and Leith, his head and hands being cut off and placed on spikes at the Pleasance port of the town, at the foot of St Mary's Wynd. The bodies of Garnock and his fellow-sufferers were buried at the foot of the gibbet, but during the night they were removed by James Renwick and some friends, and reinterred in the West Church burying-ground of Edinburgh. They also took down the heads of Garnock and the others, in order to place them beside their bodies. But, the day dawning before this could be accomplished, they were compelled to bury them in the garden of a favourer of their cause, named Tweedie, in Lauriston, where in 1728 they were accidentally discovered and interred with much honor in Greyfriars churchyard, near the Martyrs' Tomb. When in prison Garnock wrote an account of his life, from the manuscript of which John Howie, in his ‘Biographia Scoticana, or Scots Worthies,’ gives several extracts. His dying testimony is printed at length in the ‘Cloud of Witnesses’.
