= Robert Cranston (cricketer) =

Scottish cricketer

Personal information
- Full name: Robert Stafford Cranston
- Born: 10 March 1890; Oldhamstocks, East Lothian, Scotland
- Died: 20 November 1959 (aged 69); Paisley, Renfrewshire, Scotland
- Batting: Right-handed
- Role: Wicket-keeper

Domestic team information
- Years: Team
- 1922–1923: Scotland

Career statistics
Competition	First-class
Matches	3
Runs scored	35
Batting average	17.50
100s/50s	–/–
Top score	31
Catches/stumpings	4/2
- Source: Cricinfo, 29 July 2022

Robert Stafford Cranston (10 March 1890 – 20 November 1959) was a Scottish first-class cricketer and civil servant.

Cranston was born in March 1890 at Oldhamstocks, East Lothian. A club cricketer for both Brunswick and Dunfermline, Cranston made his debut for Scotland in first-class cricket against Ireland at Glasgow in 1922. He played two further first-class matches for Scotland in 1923, against Ireland at Dublin and Surrey at Glasgow. Cranston scored 35 runs in his three matches at an average of 17.50, with a highest score of 31. Outside of cricket, Cranston was employed as a clerk by the Air Ministry.
