= Woodlands, Falkirk =

Residential area of Falkirk, Scotland

Coordinates: 55°59′50″N 3°47′22″W

A large home in Woodlands, Falkirk

Woodlands is a large, prosperous central area (ward) of Falkirk, Stirlingshire, Scotland, which is mainly residential. Much of the ward is taken up by leafy streets where property prices are among the highest in Central Scotland (with several houses selling at over £800,000) and includes Lochgreen, Slamannan, Rosebank, Gartcows and Southern Pleasance areas (excluding property in Pleasance Gardens and Pleasance Court). Many of the Victorian and Edwardian houses were built by wealthy industrialists who had profited from Falkirk's economic prosperity during the industrial revolution, often without regard to expense.

The area is close to the town centre - the shopping centre and high street are not within Woodlands, however, as the limit of the ward area is the nearby Scout Hall - and incorporates the Dollar Park, given to the town by Falkirk-born billionaire Robert Dollar, who is recorded as the 80th richest man ever to live. Dollar Park is situated on Camelon Road, one of the busiest roads in Scotland. Both the Lord Lieutenant of Stirling and Falkirk and the Chief Executive of Falkirk Council live in Woodlands.

== Places ==
Local schools include Comely Park School, with high competition for places, founded in 1878, and Bantaskine Primary School, situated near the Bantaskine Estate. Secondary schools include St. Mungo's Roman Catholic High School. However, many families educate their children privately at Edinburgh public schools or at Dollar Academy.

Falkirk Lawn Tennis Club, founded in 1891, is situated within the area, as is Falkirk Bowling Club, founded in 1838. Refurbishment of the Woodlands Community Sports Hall was completed in 2023.

The local public house situated on High Station Road is the famous Woodside Inn.

Most of Woodlands is in the Parish of St. Andrew's West Church, and some is also in the Parishes of Falkirk Old and St. Modan's, and Erskine Parish Church. Some also attend the Roman Catholic St Francis Xavier's Church, Falkirk.

== Economy ==
In the 2006 Scottish Index of Deprivation (compiled by the Scottish Executive) a particular part of Woodlands was ranked 11th highest out of 6500 areas in Scotland in terms of income.

According to the 2001 Census, 35% of residents are of Social Class A/B (compared to 17% in Falkirk), with only 15% receiving benefits. 33% of residents hold a First or other professional degree (compared to 14% in Falkirk) and 42% of housing is detached (compared to 17% in Falkirk). 86% of housing is owner occupied (compared to 60% in Falkirk), while only 10% is council housing (compared to 33% in Falkirk).
