= Jim Howie =

Australian rules footballer, born 1917

Personal information
- Full name: Jim Howie
- Born: 25 September 1917
- Died: 4 April 2006 (aged 88)
- Original team: Newtown
- Height: 175 cm (5 ft 9 in)
- Weight: 78 kg (172 lb)

Playing career^{1}
Years	Club	Games (Goals)
1944–45	Geelong	14 (1)
- ^{1} Playing statistics correct to the end of 1945.

Jim Howie (25 September 1917 – 4 April 2006) was an Australian rules footballer who played with Geelong in the Victorian Football League (VFL).

Howie, a former Victorian Policeman, was also an accomplished professional athlete, winning the 1945 Colac Gift and the 1946 Geelong Gift.
