= John Howie (businessman) =

- Born: 1833; Riccarton, Ayrshire
- Died: 1895 (aged 61–62); Hurlford, Ayrshire
- Occupation: Industrialist
- Spouse: Mary Paterson
- Children: Maggie Jessie Reid, Mary Bruce, Agnes Jane, William Frederick Charles, Robert Arthur Douglas, Henry James John

John Howie (12 March 1833 – 22 September 1895) was a wealthy Victorian captain of industry and investor, the proprietor of the renowned J & R Howie Hurlford Fireclay Works. He would have been about 350th on a national Rich List of Britain at the time, with a fortune equal to over £200 million today. At his death, he was one of the richest men in Scotland.

== Background and career ==
Shawhill House, Riccarton, owned by the Howie family

Born the son of William Howie, and his second cousin Margaret Howie, Howie joined the family firm and quickly established it as one of the foremost fireclay works in Britain (later bought by Armitage Shanks), producing a huge range of items from bricks, sanitary ware such as toilets and baths, drainage materials, feeding dishes and troughs, chimneys and garden ornaments. He also owned several large coal mines and pits. Howie's family owned much of the town of Hurlford, including Marchmont Place, Salisbury Place, Collier Row, Office Row, Chapel Cottages, Skerrington Row and Howie's Square. They also owned small mining villages including Hemphill and Corsehill. J & R Howie continued to operate under the National Coal Board, and still exists legally as a company today, though it is currently dormant and non-trading.

In spite of his vast wealth, Howie did not live extravagantly, living at the family home of Newhouse in Hurlford, a mansion-house nearby the mine, now an extended 22-bedroomed residential care home. Howie was a Calvinist, his family having been involved in the Covenanting movement.

Howie's son, Frederick, bought Templetonburn House, one of Ayrshire's finest mansions built at a cost of £20,000, before burning down later in the 20th century, and its estate.

== Death and legacy ==
Upon his death in 1895, he had amassed a fortune of £50,000, equivalent to over £100 million today (relative GDP). This sum did not include the value of the business itself or the value of property (which would have taken it to well over £100,000), but was made up from investments, domestic and international, that had been made in numerous mining companies and other manufacturing businesses.

== Family ==
Howie married Mary Paterson and had six children.

- John Howie was the cousin of industrialist Thomas W. Howie
- John Howie was a relation of footballer James Howie
- John Howie was a distant cousin of writer John Howie
- John Howie was the great-great-uncle of actor Robbie Coltrane
- John Howie was first cousin twice removed of the current Lord Glenarthur
