= Robert James M'Ghee =

Robert James M'Ghee (1789–1872) was a Church of Ireland clergyman and anti-Catholic polemicist. He was educated at Trinity College, Dublin.

In the 1830s he mounted an extensive campaign of public speeches denouncing the Catholic Church in Ireland's perceived attempt to promote the work of Belgian theologian Pierre Dens, which he believed to be subversive, corrupt and disrespectful. Like Archbishop Magee of Dublin and Archbishop Magee of York, he was also a critic of High Church influences in the Church, whom he accused of "popish leanings."

In 1840 he donated the first part of a 32-volume collection of Catholic bibles, catechisms, theological writings and pamphlets (which constituted his evidence for the "crimes of the papal apostasy") to the Cambridge University Library, the Bodleian Library, Oxford and the library of Trinity College, Dublin.

== Sources ==
- The M'Ghee Collection at Cambridge University
- Oxford Dictionary of National Biography entry
- Church or Protestant Sect? The Church of Ireland, High Churchmanship, and the Oxford Movement
