= Oldhamstocks =

Coordinates: 55.928°N 2.414°W

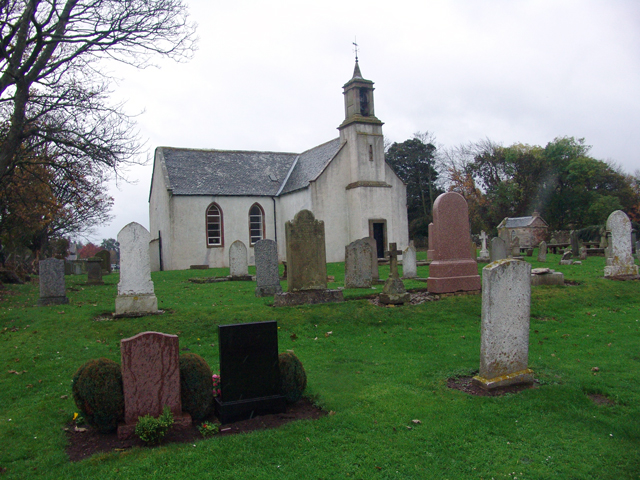
- Oldhamstocks Kirk and kirkyard

- Location within Scotland
- Population: 193 (2001)
- OS grid reference: NT741706
- Civil parish: Oldhamstocks
- Council area: East Lothian Council
- Lieutenancy area: East Lothian
- Country: Scotland
- Sovereign state: United Kingdom
- Post town: Cockburnspath
- Postcode district: TD13
- Dialling code: 01368
- Police: Scotland
- Fire: Scottish
- Ambulance: Scottish
- UK Parliament: East Lothian
- Scottish Parliament: East Lothian

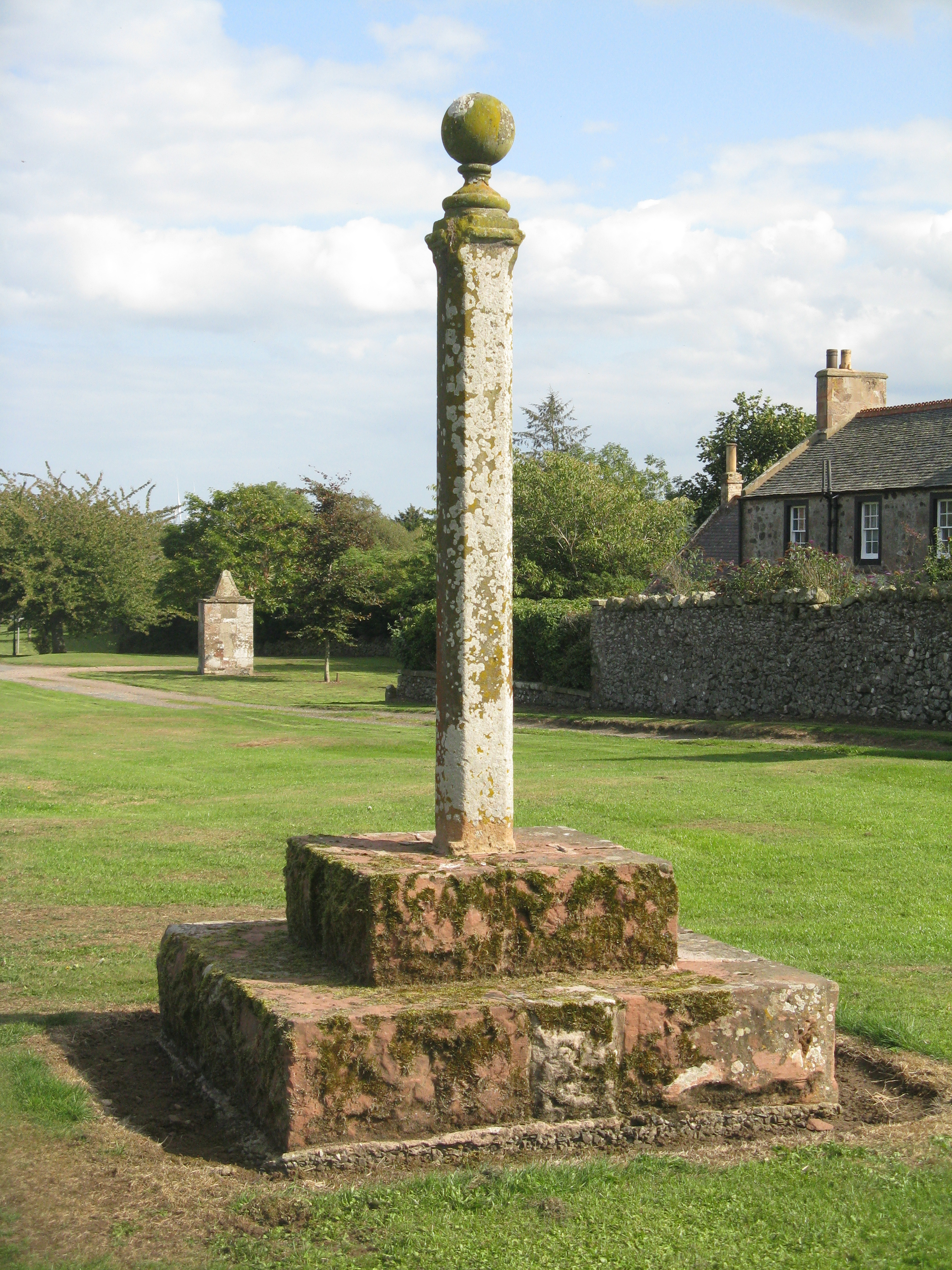

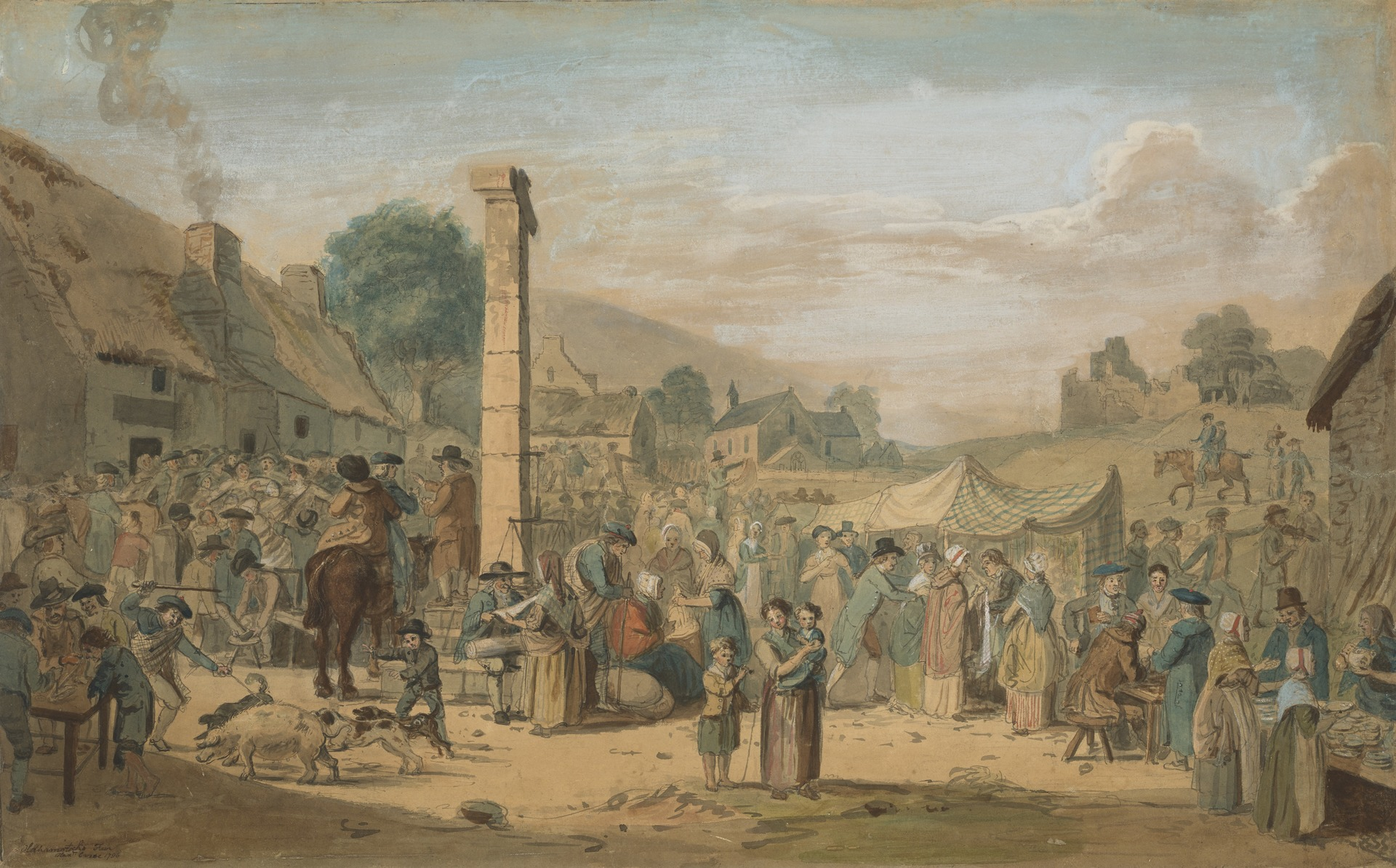
Oldhamstocks Fair by Alexander Carse

Oldhamstocks is a civil parish and small village in the east of East Lothian, Scotland, adjacent to the Scottish Borders and overlooking the North Sea. It is located 6 miles (10 km) south-east of Dunbar and has a population of 193. The church was consecrated by Bishop David de Bernham, 19 October 1242. Its chancel is a fine example of late Gothic — probably fifteenth-century work.

The summer Gala Day hosts activities such as sporting events. There is also judging of vegetables, plants and artwork.

Prior to 1891 the parish was also partly in Berwickshire and had a detached portion at Butterdean of 1417 acres. The detached portion was transferred to Coldingham, Berwickshire, while the main part of the parish is now wholly within East Lothian.

In 1650 Oliver Cromwell spent a night in the village prior to defeating the Scots at the Battle of Dunbar.

== Notable people ==
- John Broadwood (1732–1812), piano maker and founder of Broadwood and Sons, grew up in Oldhamstocks
- Robert Cranston (1890–1959), first-class cricketer
- John Currie, Moderator of the General Assembly of the Church of Scotland in 1709.
- James Hardy LL.D. (1815–1898), naturalist and antiquarian of Berwickshire and the Scottish Borders, born in Oldhamstocks
- Bonaventure Hepburn OM (born James Hepburn; 14 July 1573, East Lothian – October 1620 or 1621, Venice, Italy) was a Scottish Roman Catholic linguist, lexicographer, philologist and biblical commentator.
- Alexander Somerville (15 March 1811 – 17 June 1885) was a British Radical journalist and soldier

== See also ==
- List of places in East Lothian
- List of places in Scotland
