= Thomas W. Howie =

- Thomas W Howie
- Born: Thomas Wyllie Howie; 8 April 1856; Riccarton, Ayrshire, Scotland
- Died: 18 July 1927 (aged 71); Falkirk, Stirlingshire, Scotland
- Occupation(s): Mine-owner, councillor
- Spouse: Barbara Picken
- Children: 6
- Relatives: Robbie Coltrane (great-grandson)

Thomas Wyllie Howie, JP (8 April 1856 – 18 July 1927) was a Scottish captain of industry.

== Background ==
Howie was born in Riccarton, Ayrshire, on 8 April 1856, to Robert and Bethia (Wyllie) Howie, into a wealthy industrial family who had been active in the Covenanting movement. He was born at the family home, Newhouse, an estate house nearby the fireclay mine which the family owned. There he was brought up alongside his cousin, who would become the mining magnate John Howie. The house is now a residential care home. Howie's father, Robert, died at the Crichton Institution in Dumfries, a private lunatic hospital, when Thomas was 27.

== Career ==
He and his wife settled in Falkirk where he became a partner in Campbell & Co Fireclay Works and coal mine, Roughcastle. He later became owner of the business. Previous to settling in Falkirk the Howie family lived in Hurlford, where they owned the renowned Hurlford Fireclay Works (until it was bought by Armitage Shanks), which produced pottery, bricks, chimneys, garden ornaments and enamelled sanitary ware (lavatories, baths, urinals etc.) The family owned much of the town, including Marchmont Place, Salisbury Place, Collier Row, Office Row, Chapel Cottages, Skerrington Row and Howie's Square. They also owned small mining villages, including Hemphill.

A supporter of the Unionist Party, Thomas Howie was a Justice of the Peace and elected a Stirling County councillor for Falkirk, vice-chairman of the Parish Council, as well as chairman of the Landward Committee.

== Family ==
Howie married Barbara Picken, sister of the Town Clerk of Glasgow, and had six children: Margaret, Robert Wyllie, Bethia, Martha, Barbara and Jean. His sons attended the High School of Glasgow and his daughters St. George's School for Girls, Edinburgh. Howie was a cousin of industrialist John Howie, a distant cousin of writer John Howie, first cousin twice removed of the current Lord Glenarthur.

His great-grandson is the actor Robbie Coltrane.

== Death and legacy ==
At a Water Board outing he was taken ill and never recovered, dying in 1927. The local newspaper at the time remembered him as a "bright and cheery man", and notes that he "took a deep interest in parochial affairs and was particularly sympathetic towards the deserving poor". Howie is buried in Falkirk cemetery. On his death, his share of the brickworks business was valued at £12,000, which is equivalent to over £2,300,000 in today's terms (relative GDP per capita).

Howie Place in Falkirk is named after him. It is near the site of the brickworks he once owned.
