= St Andrew's West =

Coordinates: 56°00′01″N 3°47′07″W

- St Andrew's West Parish Church
- St Andrew's West

- The church within Falkirk council area
- Location: Falkirk
- Country: Scotland
- Denomination: Church of Scotland
- Previous denomination: Free Church of Scotland; United Free Church of Scotland
- Website: falkirkstandrewswest.org

History
- Former name(s): Free Church of Falkirk; St. Andrew's United Free Church; St. Andrew's Parish Church
- Status: Parish church
- Dedication: Saint Andrew

Architecture
- Functional status: Active
- Heritage designation: Category C(s) listed building
- Designated: 23 April 1979
- Architect: James Strang
- Style: English Gothic
- Completed: 1896

St. Andrew's West Parish Church is the largest church in Falkirk, Scotland, founded in 1843 and situated in the town centre on Upper Newmarket Street and known for its conservative evangelical preaching, aligning itself with the Forward Together group and the Evangelical Alliance. It is a congregation of the Church of Scotland.

Originally known as the Free Church of Falkirk, from 1900 it became St. Andrew's United Free Church, and with the union of the Church of Scotland became St. Andrew's Parish Church in 1929. In 1990 the Church merged with the West Church.

The present Gothic building was built in 1896 at a cost of £8,100 to designs by architect James Strang, to whom a memorial window was erected in the church. It is protected as a category C(s) listed building.

The Manse is a Victorian house located in Maggiewoods Loan, Falkirk. The Manse tennis courts were sold in the 1990s.

The church interior

== Ministers ==
- Rev Lewis H Irving, BD (1843–1877)
- Rev Hugh Mair, BD (1877–1883)
- Rev Dr Thomas Adamson, DD (1884–1888)
- Rev James B Johnston, BD, FRHistS (1888–1928)
- Rev Alexander Ferguson, BD (1928–1939)
- Rev William Soutar, BD (1939–1951)
- Rev Robert Pollock, BD (1951–1971)
- Rev Dr Robert McGhee, DD (1972–1996)
- Rev Alistair M Horne, BSc, BD (1997–)

== See also ==
- List of Church of Scotland parishes
