= James Lawson (minister) =

Scottish minister, successor to John Knox

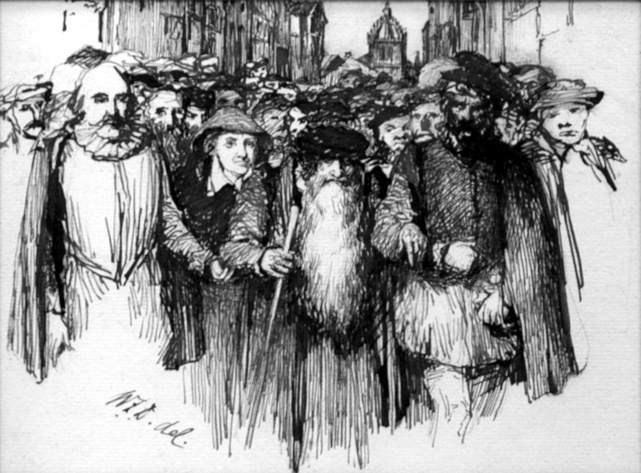
- Knox leaving St Giles' after inducting Lawson

Personal details
- Born: 1538
- Died: 1584 (aged 45–46)

minister of St Machar's (Old Machar)
- In office 1569 – 9 November 1572

minister of St. Giles' Cathedral
- In office 9 November 1572 – 1584

Moderator of the General Assembly of the Church of Scotland
- In office 12 July 1580 at Dundee – close

James Lawson was the Church of Scotland minister who succeeded John Knox at St Giles' Cathedral in Edinburgh. Lawson's great educational achievement was the founding of the University of Edinburgh. He may be said to have been its principal promoter, and its best and wisest friend during the first year of its history, 1583.

James Lawson was a fellow-student at St Andrews with Andrew Melville in 1559, having been educated gratuitously by Andrew Simson, the celebrated master of the school of Perth. The Countess of Crawford appointed him tutor to her son, with whom he travelled on the continent. In 1568, on his return, he obtained an appointment to teach Hebrew in the New College of St Andrews. In 1569 he was presented to the office of sub-principal of the University of Aberdeen. In 1572 he succeeded John Knox as minister of Edinburgh. He was Moderator of the Assembly which met at Dundee in 1580. In May 1584 he was obliged to flee to England for his opposition to the Black Acts. He died in London on the 12 October of the same year. His funeral was widely attended. James Lawson was a strenuous supporter both of the High School and the University of Edinburgh.

== Early life, education and career ==
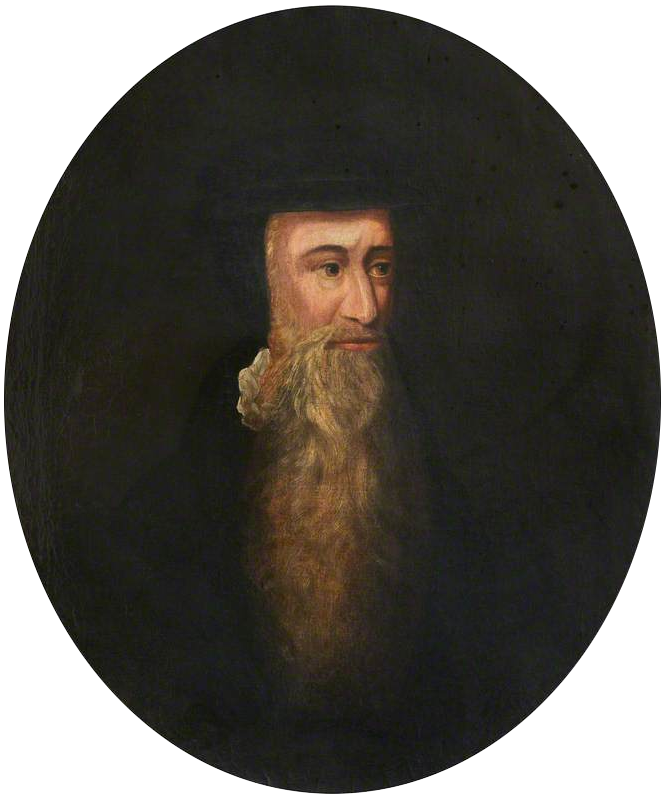
John Knox (c.1514–1572) Adrian Vanson (d. before 1610) (after)

James Lawson, born 1538, at Perth, 1572 of humble parentage. He received his early education at Perth Grammar School under the celebrated Andrew Simson. In 1559 he became the fellow-student and friend of Andrew Melville at St Andrews. After graduating he travelled on the Continent as tutor to the young Earl of Crawford. There he found opportunity for acquiring a knowledge of Hebrew, and returning to Scotland in 1507 or 1568 was prevailed upon by the professors of the university of St. Andrews to teach there that language, which was hitherto unknown in Scotland. In 1568 he was appointed to teach Hebrew in the New College, St Andrews. In 1569, after the "purging" of the University of Aberdeen, he was promoted to be Sub-Principal of King's College, and the same year he became minister of Old Machar. He became the recognised leader of the reformed clergy in the north of Scotland, and one of the most trusted confidants of Knox.

== Knox's successor ==
In September 1572 Knox, feeling 'nature so decayed' that he looked 'not for a long continuance' of his 'battle.' sent for Lawson with the view of having a special conference with him. In 1572, "after long reasoning," he was called to be successor to John Knox. Following a "trial" sermon preached on 19 September, he was admitted to St Giles' by Knox himself on 9 November 1572. Knox with great difficulty officiated on the occasion, and bade the assemblage his 'last good night.' On Knox's death Lawson became one of the recognised leaders of the kirk, and encouraged a policy of intolerance without increasing its prosperity.

== Founding Edinburgh University ==
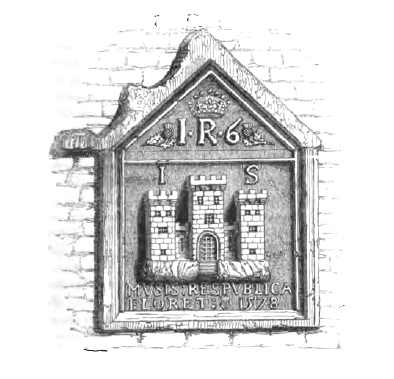
Carved stone from the Blackfriars Pediment (1578)

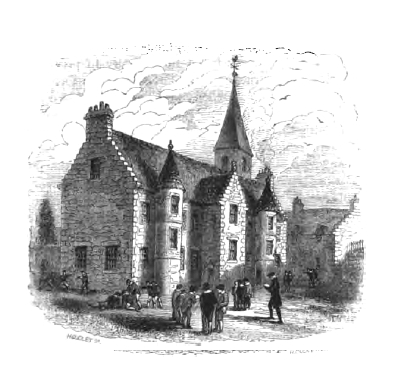
High School, Blackfriars 1578

Lawson was a big influence in building work for the High School of Edinburgh in 1578 and in establishing the University of Edinburgh. Grant in his history of the university says: "the leading spirit...and the man to whom, above all others, the foundation of the University of Edinburgh is due, was James Lawson, "who for gifts and estimation was chief among the Ministry" of Scotland. Lawson was a man of culture and experience, as well as of piety and earnestness."

== Wider church roles ==
He assisted in the drawing up of the First Book of Discipline, and was an examiner of all books proposed to be printed. He was Moderator of the Dundee Assembly, 1 July 1580. He served on most of its committees, and took a prominent part in the disputes of the kirk with the civil power.

Lawson attended Regent Morton when under sentence of death, and plied him with somewhat inquisitorial queries. He also attended him on the scaffold on 2 June 1581. He was zealous in defending the authority of the Church in the affair of Archbishop Montgomery, 1582. Subsequently the Duke of Lennox, who had been the chief instrument of Morton's fall, lamentably disappointed the hopes of the Presbyterians, and Lawson became one of his most persistent opponents. For a time the kirk triumphed, but after the accession of Arran to power it fared worse than before.

== Denunciation and flight to England ==
On account of Lawson's denunciation in the pulpit of the acts of the parliament of 1584 — which were supposed to interfere with the jurisdiction of the kirk — Arran vowed that "if Lawson's head were as great as an haystack, I shall cause it to leap from his hawse [throat]." For this he was compelled to fly, and accompanied by Balcanquhal, sought refuge at Berwick, 27 May 1584. Always a man of melancholic mood, he was so affected by the troubles of the times and the unworthy conduct of some of his flock that he resolved to leave the country altogether, and make his home in England. Arrangements were made for his arrest on 28 May, but on the 27th he escaped to Berwick, proceeding thence to London. When his flight and that of Walter Balcanquall became known an act was passed by the privy council declaring that they had left their charges void ' against their duties and professions,' and appointing other ministers to preach in their stead (Reg. Privy Council Scotland, iii. 668). During their absence their wives addressed a long joint letter of rebuke to the Bishop of St. Andrews, in which they likened him to Chaucer's cook, who 'skadded' (i.e. scalded) his 'lips in other men's kaile' Not long afterwards the magistrates were charged to dislodge the ladies from their dwellings.

== Illness and death ==
The turn of events had seriously affected the health of Lawson, and, according to Calderwood, 'waisted his vitall spirits by peece meale' (ib. p. 13). He died in London of dysentery on 12 Oct. 1584. His will and testament dated from 'Houie (Honie) Lain of Cheapside.' has been preserved by Calderwood (ib. pp. 201–8). James Melville spoke of him as "a man of singular learning, zeal, and eloquence, whom I never heard preach but he melted my heart with tears " (Diary, p. 146). Lawson's great educational achievement was the founding of the University of Edinburgh. He may be said to have been its principal promoter, and its best and wisest friend during the first year of its history, 1583.

== Funeral ==
The event which revealed most fully the close connection between the Scottish ministers and the London puritans was the funeral of James Lawson, minister of Edinburgh, who died at Anthony Martin's house in Honey Lane on 12 October 1584. His funeral, on the following day, was the occasion of a gathering of English and Scottish presbyterians not only more impressive than any other recorded in the sixteenth century, but in a sense more representative than even the Westminster assembly. The Scottish exiles were represented by their leaders Andrew Melville, James Carmichael, John Davidson and Walter Balcanquhall, and by three young men from St. Andrews university who later became ministers in Scotland — John Cowper, Archibald Moncrieff and Alexander Forsyth. An Anglo-Scottish element was present in the persons of one Guthrie, a Scot who kept a school at Hoddesdon, Hertfordshire, and who was related to Lawson's wife; John Morrison, formerly a minister in East Lothian, and now curate of St. Botolph's, Aldersgate; and William Lynne, a Glasgow graduate whom Thomas Smeton had sent to England and who later became a student and a fellow at Cambridge. The English puritans were represented by the well-known Walter Travers, now preacher at the Temple; John Field, the party organiser; William Charke, preacher at Lincoln's Inn; Gardener from Whitechapel; Dr. Crook of Gray's Inn; Barber of St. Mary-le-bow; Stephen Egerton of St. Anne's in Blackfriars; Edmonds of Allhallows in Bread Street; "Hundsone" or "Indsonn" of St. Peter's in Cheapside; and Lever Wood, recently deprived for non-conformity. The high master of St. Paul's school (John Harrison) was there, and the three ministers of the French church in London. Among names difficult of identification, but possibly significant, are those of "Mr. Bacon, gentleman," "Mr. Bodley," and "secretary Walsingham's gentleman." The total number present was over five hundred, at a time when the average attendance at a London funeral — so at least the Scots believed — was seldom one hundred; there were many women who had been "careful mothers and sisters" to the deceased, including an alder- man's wife who had bestowed twenty grains of unicorn's horn on him. The list of English puritans present at the funeral gives a clue to the personnel of the general conferences held at London in that same winter, when to the leading London puritans there were of course added a number from other parts of the country.

== Legacy ==
After his death a forged testament was put forth in his name by Bishop Adamson, in which he is represented as repenting of his opposition to episcopacy (ib. p. 697-732). Although as an ecclesiastic Lawson was conscientious rather than enlightened, he had a sincere love of learning and literature. He is thus described by Arthur Johnston —

Corpora non magno, mens ingens: spiritus ardens.

== Family ==
He married Janet (died 1592), daughter of Alexander Guthrie, common clerk of Edinburgh, and had issue —

- James
- Elizabeth (married George Grier minister of Haddington, died 26 December 1613)
- Katharine (married (1) Gilbert Dick; (2) Patrick Galloway, minister of St Giles, 1607)

== Publications ==
Lawson is the author of the account of Knox's last illness, originally published as an appendix to Thomas Smeton's Ad Virvlentvm Archibaldi Hamiltonii Apostatæ Dialogvm Responsio 1579, its title being Eximii Viri Johannis Knoxii, Scoticanæ ecclesiæ lnstauratoris Fidelissimi, vera extremæ vitæ et obitus Historia, a Pio quodam, et Docto Viro descripta, qui ad extremum usque spiritum segrotanti assedit. An English translation is published in Appendix to Knox's 'Works' (vi. 648–60).

- Account of the Life and Death of that Illustrious Man, John Knox (Knox's Works, vi.; Christ. Mag., vi.)

== Bibliography ==
- Edin. Comic, and Test. Reg
- Reg. Assig.
- Petrie's and Calderwood's Hists.
- Wodrow's Biog.
- New Spalding Club Collections
- Knox's Works
- Richard Bannatyne's Memorials
- Register Privy Council Scotl. vol. iii.
- Life in Selections from Wodrow's Biog. Collections, pp. 193–235 (New Spalding Club, 1890)
