= Walter Balcanquhall (divine) =

Scottish minister

Walter Balcanquhal

Personal details
- Born: 1548
- Died: 4 August 1616 (aged 67–68)

Minister of St. Giles' Cathedral
- In office Whit Sunday 1574 – May 1597

Minister of Trinity College Kirk
- In office 18 April 1598 – 1584

Chaplain to the Altar called Jesus
- In office 20 November 1579 – close

Walter Balcanquhall (1548–1617), was one of the first Presbyterian ministers in Edinburgh after the Reformation in Scotland.

He is almost certain to have been born at Balcanquhal, Strathmiglo, probably in 1548. After studying at St Andrews, he was exhorter at Aberdour in 1571, and entered St Giles on Whit Sunday 1574. At that time he is described in James Melvill's Diary as "ane honest, upright-hearted young man, latlie enteret to the ministerie of Edinburgh." He was elected to the chaplaincy of the Altar called Jesus, on 20 November 1579. Having preached against the influence of the French at Court, on 7 December 1580, he was called before the Privy Council, on 9 January 1581, and admonished. He attended the Earl of Morton on the eve of his execution, in 1581. He opposed the Black Acts of 1584, and was obliged to flee for safety to Berwick-on-Tweed. While there, his wife along with Mrs Lawson, wife of James Lawson, addressed to the Archbishop a long and most extraordinary letter of rebuke and vituperation(P. C. Reg., iii., 691. On returning after the storm had passed, Balcanquhal came once more into royal favour. On 2 January 1586 he preached before the King (though James "rebuked him from his seat in the loft" for some of his opinions). Balcanquhal attended the coronation of Queen Anne, on 17 May 1590. In 1596 his bold utterances again brought him into conflict with the sovereign, and a warrant having been issued, again he escaped to Yorkshire. He demitted his ministry at St Giles in May 1597, in order to admit of new parochial divisions of the city, and on 18 April 1598 he was admitted to Trinity College Kirk. On 10 September 1600 he was called before the Privy Council for questioning the genuineness of the Gowrie Conspiracy, but, professing to be satisfied with its reality, he was dismissed. He was a member of the Assembly of 1602. Along with Robert Pont he took protestation at the cross of Edinburgh, in name of the whole Kirk, against the verdict of the Assize finding the brethren who met in General Assembly at Aberdeen guilty of treason. For condemning the proceedings of the General Assembly, 1610, he was again called before the Privy Council, and admonished. Falling into bad health, he ceased preaching, on 16 July 1616, and died on 4 August 1617. He bequeathed 1000 merks towards the stipend of a Professor of Divinity in the University of Edinburgh.

== Biography ==
Balcanquhall derives his surname originally from lands in the parish of Strathmiglo, Fife. It is nearly certain that Walter was of the 'ilk' of Balcanquhall, and that he was born there—according to his age at death—in 1548 (cf. Sibbald's 'List of the Heritors' (1710) in History of Fife, appendix No. 2).

=== Early ministry ===
The earliest notice of Balcanquhall is that he was entered as 'minister of St. Giles, Edinburgh,' on Whit Sunday 1574, with the descriptor that 'he was desyrit by other towns and large stipend promist,' but 'yet he consented to stay and accept what they pleased.' At this time he is described in James Melville's 'Diary' (p. 41, Wodrow Society) as 'ane honest, upright hearted young man, latlie enterit to that menestrie of Edinbruche' [Edinburgh]. He was elected to the chaplaincy of the Altar called Jesus, 20 November 1579. Having preached a memorable sermon, mainly directed against the influence of the French at court, 7 December 1580, he was called before the privy council on 9 December. and 'discharged.' He attended the Earl of Morton while in prison under condemnation, 2 June 1581.

=== Opposition to the King ===
When James VI of Scotland devised his scheme of re-establishing 'the bishops' in Scotland, he found Balcanquhall, along with James Lawson, Robert Pont, and Andrew Melville, and their like-minded brethren, in active opposition. On the calling together of the estates of the realm in 1584, the king sent an imperative message to the magistrates of Edinburgh 'to seize and imprison any of the ministers who should venture to speak against the proceedings of the parliament.' But Balcanquhall (along with James Lawson) preached fearlessly against the proposals; and along with Pont and others took his stand at the cross while the heralds proclaimed the acts passed by the subservient parliament, and publicly 'protested and took instruments' in the name of the 'kirk' of Scotland against them. The sermon was delivered on 24 May. A warrant was issued, and Balcanquhall and Lawson fled to Berwick-on-Tweed (Melville, Diary, p. 119).

=== Development of ministry ===
The storm blew over, though his house in Parliament Square was given to another in the interval. On his return to Edinburgh, a house formerly occupied by Durie was given to him (1585). On 2 January 1586 he preached before the king 'in the great kirk of Edinburgh' [St. Giles] when the sovereign 'after sermon rebuikit Mr. Walter publiclie from his seat in the loaft [gallery] and said he [the king] would prove there should be bishops and spirituall magistrats endued with authoritie over the minestrie; and that he [Balcanquhall] did not his dutie to condemn that which he had done in parliament' (Melville, Diary, p. 491). In this year (1586) he is found one of eight to whom was committed the discipline of Lothian by the general assembly. A larger house, which had been formerly occupied by his colleague Watson, was assigned to him 28 July 1587, and his stipend augmented. He was appointed to attend the coronation of Anne of Denmark as queen consort, 17 May 1590. For some years he seems to have been wholly occupied with his pulpit and pastoral work.

=== Further controversies ===
In 1596, however, his bold utterances again brought him into conflict with the sovereign; but a warrant having again been issued, again he escaped—this time to Yorkshire, after being 'put to the horn' as a fugitive. Balcanquhall and other ministers including Robert Bruce went into exile in England at Caldwell and it was said that their preaching and talking became wearisome to the Archbishop of York.

He appears to have been absent from Edinburgh from December 1596 to April or May 1597. In May 1597 he resigned his 'great charge' of St. Giles in order to admit of new parochial divisions of the city. In July he was permitted to return, and was chosen 'minister' of Trinity College Church, to which he was admitted 18 April 1598. He was the friend and companion of the Rev. Robert Bruce, and bribes were tendered him in vain to get him to 'fall away' from Bruce. On 10 September 1600 he was once more in difficulties, having been called before the privy council for doubting the truth of the Gowrie conspiracy. 'Transported' by the general assembly to some other parish, 16 May 1601, he was afterwards allowed to return to Trinity College (19 June), and he was in the general assembly of 1602. In conjunction with Robert Pont, he again took his stand at the cross, and publicly protested in name of the 'kirk' against the verdict of assize finding the brethren who met in General Assembly of Aberdeen guilty of treason. Later, for condemning the proceedings of the general assembly in 1610 he was summoned before the privy council and admonished.

=== Final stages of ministry ===
He ceased preaching on 16 July 1616 from a disease in his teeth, and died 14 August 1617, in the sixty-eighth year of his age and forty-third of his ministry.

== Marriage and issue ==
He married Katharine, daughter of James Marjoribanks, merchant, in right of whom he entered burgess and guild-brother of the city, 15 February 1591, and had issue:

- Robert, minister of Tranent
- Walter Balcanquhall, D.D., Fellow of Pembroke College, Oxford, 1611, chaplain to James VI., Dean of Rochester 1624, Dean of Durham 1639, one of the executors of George Heriot, and author of the Statutes for the regulation of Heriot's Hospital, born 1586, died 25 December 1645
- John
- Samuel, baptised 11 January 1595-6
- Katherine (married, pro. 30 September 1601, Nicol Udward, Dean of Guild, Edinburgh). Their daughter Christian Udwart married Robert Inglis, a London-based merchant financier who worked as a London agent for the Earl of Lothian and Countess of Home.
- Rachel (married, pro. 31 October 1605, John Makcubine, merchant, Edinburgh)
- Sara
- Margaret
- Libra. (Edin. Com. Rec Dec, 20 November 1592-3)
- Anna (G. R. Inhib., viii., 384)

== Bibliography ==
- Edin. Counc, Guild, and Reg. (Bapt.)
- Steven's Mem. of Heriot
- Booke of the Kirk
- Craufurd's Univ. Edin.
- Melvill's Autob.
