= James Carmichael (minister) =

Scottish Reformed minister

- Church: Haddington

Personal details
- Born: 1542/3
- Died: 1628 (aged 66–68)

minister of Haddington
- In office 25 August 1570 – 1584

schoolmaster of Haddington Grammar now Knox Academy
- In office 16 April 1572 – 15 November 1576

minister of Haddington including constant Moderator of the Presbytery of Haddington 1606-1628 and compliler of the Acts of Assembly 1592-1595
- In office 1587–1628

James Carmichael (1542/3–1628) was the Church of Scotland minister and an author known for a Latin grammar published at Cambridge in September 1587 and for his work revising the Second Book of Discipline and the Acts of Assembly. In 1584, Carmichael was forced to seek shelter in England along with the Melvilles and others. Andrew Melville called him "the profound dreamer." Robert Wodrow said that "a great strain of both piety and strong learning runs through his letters and papers." Dr. Laing says there is every probability that " The Booke of the Universall Kirk " was compiled by Carmichael. The James Carmichaell collection of proverbs in Scots was published by Edinburgh University in 1957 which includes some proverbs also collected by David Ferguson.

== Early life, education and career ==
James Carmichael studied at St Leonard's College, St Andrews, and graduated M.A. about 1564. Prior to July 1570 he was master of the Grammar School at St Andrews.

== Early work in Haddington ==
On 25 August 1570 he was settled in Haddington. Presented to the vicarage of Nungate 2 November 1571. From 16 April 1572 to 15 November 1576 he acted as schoolmaster of the parish, but resigned at the latter date, the Town Council having resolved (28 May 1576) "that in no time coming should the minister of the kirk be admitted school-master of the burgh." In 1574 he had also charge of Bolton, Athelstaneford, and St Martin's. He was one of a committee of four who prepared the Acts of the Kirk for more general use, and he assisted in the revision of publications, particularly the Second Book of Discipline.

== In England ==
In 1584 he was compelled to take shelter in England, for being in sympathy with the Ruthven Raiders. He returned in 1587. Criticism from a number of pulpits may have led the government to believe that some of the clergy had been party to an attempt by the Ruthven faction to regain power, which had resulted in the taking of Stirling Castle in April. The Earl of Gowrie was executed on 2 May for his alleged involvement in the failed coup, although he appears to have been doing his best to leave the country via Dundee at the time. On the same day, James Carmichael, minister of Haddington, Patrick Galloway, minister of Perth, John Davidson, minister of Liberton, and Andrew Polwart, minister of Cadder, fled to England to join Andrew Melville in exile, having been summoned before the privy council for involvement in the conspiracy.

Carmichael published a Latin grammar at Cambridge in September 1587. He dedicated it to James VI in Latin, "Scotorum regi christianissimo gratiam et pacem à Domino". Carmichael's work, Grammatice Latino de Etymologia, was from the press of the university printer, Thomas Thomas, a lexicographer himself, and its full title is given by Ames; it consists of 52 pp., and has some commendatory poems prefixed. There is a copy of it in the Bodleian.

== Haddington resumption and wider church roles ==
Carmichael returned to Haddington in 1587. He was engaged from 1592 to 1595 in abridging the Acts of Assembly. He was nominated the constant Moderator of Presbytery by the Assembly in 1606.

Cameron relates that Carmichael was "intimately involved in the trial of witches". According to James Melville of Halhill, Carmichael had the "history and whole depostions" of those accused in the North Berwick witch trials. On 27 March 1615, Carmichael wrote to James VI and I asking for remuneration for his fifteen months of work examining witches. He may have been the author of Newes from Scotland, a 1591 tract describing the North Berwick trials.

Carmichael died between 28 May and 24 September 1628, aged 85.

== Family ==
He married Violet, daughter of Andrew Simson, minister of Dalkeith (Reg. Sec. Sig., xlvi., 92; A. and D., ccexxxii., 348), and had issue —

- Nathaniel
- James, minister of Athelstaneford.

== Publications ==
- Grammatice Latino de Etymologia liber secundus (Cantabury, 1587), 52 pp. [see copy in the Bodleian]
- a Poem (prefixed to Skene's Regiam Mnjestatem, of which he corrected the proof at the request of the Privy Council)
- Correspondence (Wodrow Miscell. and Calderwood's Hist., iv., v.).
- The James Carmichaell collection of proverbs in Scots; from the original manuscript in the Edinburgh University Library

== Bibliography ==
- Cooper's Athenæ Cantab. ii. 22
- Ames’s Topogr. Antiq. (Herbert), 1414, l4l8.
- Reg. Min., Assig. and Test. Reg.
- M'Crie's Melville, ii.
- Booke of the Kirk
- Spottiswood's and Calderwood's histories.
- Wodrow and Maitland's Miscellanies, ii.
- New Statistical Account
- Miller's Haddington
- Reg. Assig., Test, and Priv. Coicnc. Reg.
- Excheq. Buik
- Lochleven Pap.
- Calderwood's Histories
- Melville's Autob.
- Acts Pari., iii., iv.
- Wodrow and Bannatyne Miscell., iii.
- M'Crie's Melville
- Cooper's Athence Cantab., ii., 22
