= Andrew Simson =

Scottish minister and schoolmaster

Andrew Simson (c.1526 – c.1591) was a Scottish minister and schoolmaster.

== Life ==
Simson studied at St. Salvator's College, St. Andrews, in 1554, and in 1559 at St. Leonard's College. He was schoolmaster of Perth Grammar School between 1550 and 1560, and embraced the doctrines of the Protestant Reformation after reading The Book of the Monarchie by Sir David Lindsay. In 1562 he became minister of Dunning and Cargill in Perthshire.

Simson was transferred to Dunbar on 28 June 1564. There he was also master of the grammar school, and had David Hume among his pupils. He gave up his charge at Dunbar before 11 September 1580, and was admitted to Dalkeith in Midlothian about October 1582, with the added charge of the churches of Lasswade and Glencorse.

On 2 November 1584 a summons was issued, in compliance with the Uniformity Act passed by the parliament in August, requiring all ministers south of the Firth of Forth to appear before Patrick Adamson, archbishop of St Andrews, and to sign the obligation prescribed by the act, binding them to acknowledge the spiritual jurisdiction of the crown. Simson, with colleagues, refused to sign. Before 18 December he invented a milder formula of his own which he was permitted to subscribe. His stipend was taken away in 1587 and given to Newbattle Abbey, but it was restored two years later.

Simson died of "old age", probably in early 1591.

== Works ==
On 15 December 1575 Simson, known as a Latinist and grammarian, was appointed member of a committee to consider the best method of teaching Latin in the Scottish schools. The privy council, acting on their report, issued on 20 December 1593, directed that the grammars in use should be superseded by two books of Latin etymology, one simple and one more advanced, which had been revised by the committee. The first of these was Rudimenta Grammatices (Edinburgh, 1587), by Simson, later frequently reprinted without his name. The second was the Liber Secundus of James Carmichael.

- Rudimenta Grammatices in gratiam juventutis Scoticoe conscripta (Edinburgh, 1587), better known as the Dunbar Rtcdiments
- Ad Coniitem Fermolodtinensem Carmen (1610), though probably by Archibald, his son.

== Family ==
Simson married Violet Adamson, daughter of a Perth baker and sister of Patrick Adamson the archbishop of St. Andrews. By her he had seven sons, six of whom became ministers, and three daughters.

- Patrick (of Spott, East Lothian and Stirling). Patrick's grandson Patrick became Moderator of the General Assembly in 1695;
- Archibald (of Dalkeith), his successor. He was also an author;
- Alexander (of Mertoun) (1570?–1639) was the author of The Destruction of Inbred Corruption, or the Christian's Warfare against the Bosom Enemy, London, 1644.;
- Richard (of Sprouston);
- William (of Burntisland and Dumbarton) The youngest son William (died 1620?) was the author of De Accentibus Hebraicis breves et perspicuæ regulæ, London, 1617, one of the first treatises on Hebrew by a Scot.;
- Abraham (of Norham);
- Matthew, Professor of Humanity, Glasgow;
- three daughters (of whom Katherine married Alexander Home, minister of Dunbar)
- Violet married James Carmichael, minister of Haddington.

== Bibliography ==
- Reg. Assig.
- Excheq. Buik
- Booke of the Kirk
- Colleg. Ch. of Mid-Lothian
- Row's and Calderwood's Hists.
- Edin. Chr. Inst., i.
- New Stat. Account
- M'Crie's Knox
- The Simsons
