= Patrick Simson =

Scottish church leader (1556–1618)

Personal details
- Born: Patrick Simson or Simpson or Symson or Symsoune or Symsone; 1556 Perth
- Died: 31 March 1618 (aged 61–62) Stirling
- Denomination: Church of Scotland
- Education: St. Mary's College

Patrick Simson (1566-1618) was a Presbyterian minister who served in Stirling during the reign of James VI of Scotland. Despite his opposition to Episcopalianism, he had the respect of King James and several of his court. He was born in Perth in 1556. He was from a prominent church family and was the son of Andrew Simson, minister of Dunbar.

He was educated at St. Mary's College, St Andrews, graduating with an M.A. in 1574. He became a reader at Borthwick and completed his education at Bridgestock in England stopping there while intended for Cambridge as he met a gentleman who allowed him use of his library. He was admitted to Spott in 1577 and translated to Cramond in 1582. He was admitted to the vicarage there on 30 August 1586. He was translated and admitted to Stirling on 7 August 1590. He was presented by James VI on May 1591.

When preaching before the King in 1598 he exhorted him to beware "lest he drew on himself secret wrath by setting up manifest idolatry." Immediately after the sermon his Majesty arose and "forbade him to meddle in these matters." He was a member of twelve out of fifteen Assemblies held prior to 1610. Simson was proposed by Assembly of 1606 "Constant Moderator" of Presbytery, but he lost to James Nicolson. He drew up a Protest to Parliament against the introduction of Episcopacy on 1 July 1606. He was chosen as Moderator of Conference at Falkland on 15 June 1608. Simson was offered a bishopric and pension by the King, but frequent attacks of disease broke down his constitution, and he died on 31 March 1618.

== Life ==
Patrick Simson (1556–1618), church historian and divine, was born at Perth in 1556. His father was Andrew Simson. His mother, Violet Adamson, was sister of Patrick Adamson, archbishop of St. Andrews. Archibald Simson, who wrote his biography, was a younger brother. Having received a classical education from his father, who was one of the best Latin scholars of the time, Patrick entered St. Mary's College, St. Andrews, at the age of fourteen, and in 1574 took his degree. He was then sent by his father to the University of Cambridge, but he was induced to remain for a time at Bridgstock, where there was a library, and to pursue his studies privately, which he did with such success that he mastered Greek, then little known in Scotland, and attained great proficiency in the knowledge of ancient history, civil and ecclesiastical. While there his father, having fallen sick, recalled him home to assist him in the school. In 1577 he was ordained and admitted minister of the adjoining parish of Spott, and, besides discharging his clerical duties, he continued to teach Greek on weekdays at Dunbar. About 1580 he was translated to Cramond in the presbytery of Edinburgh, and in 1584, when all the clergy were ordered to subscribe the acts then made in favour of episcopacy, and to promise obedience to their bishops on pain of forfeiting their stipends, Simson refused, although his diocesan, Patrick Adamson, archbishop of St. Andrews, was his maternal uncle.

In 1590 the general assembly appointed Simson to Stirling, then a royal residence and a resort of courtiers and learned men, and there he spent the remaining twenty-seven years of his life. He had much influence with the king and the Earl of Mar; but when the attempt to introduce episcopacy was renewed, Simson became one of the weightiest opponents of the royal policy. He declined the offer of a bishopric, and afterwards of a pension, to induce him to connive at the changes which were being introduced.

He attended the trial of the six ministers for high treason at Linlithgow, and befriended them by every means in his power; he drew up and signed the protest against episcopacy presented to parliament in 1606, raised a subscription for Andrew Melville when a prisoner in the Tower of London, and refused the permanent moderatorship of the presbytery of Stirling. At the same time he took a leading part in the conferences that were held to prevent an open schism in the church, and urged his brethren to continue to attend the synods after the bishops began to preside over them. He opposed the changes in worship which followed the introduction of episcopacy, and in 1617 the bishop of Galloway wrote urging him to help the bishops ‘out of his talent’ in resisting some of the innovations which the king was forcing down their throats. With all this he was so moderate, peaceable, and charitable, that no one could take exception to his proceedings, and he retained through life the favour of the king, to whom he was constantly loyal and respectful. Such was his conciliatory spirit that he was sometimes blamed by extreme men of his own party, and his efforts to preserve peace were taken advantage of by the bishops, and improved to advance their own purposes.

Simson was a constant student, and acquired Hebrew after he was fifty years of age. His favourite studies were the fathers and church history, and because of his wisdom and learning he was much consulted by his clerical brethren. He was successful as a preacher and pastor, and was held in affection by his flock, many of whom, such as Marie Stewart, Countess of Mar, the king's cousin, and the Lady Erskine, venerated him as their spiritual father. He found the people of Stirling turbulent, merchants and craftsmen often engaging in bloody contests in the streets, and he restored peace to the community. John Livingstone, who was schooled in Stirling, trembled when he first took communion in Simson's church. Simson remained at his post in time of plague, and discharged his duties at the risk of his life. In his last illness people of all ranks crowded round his bed to receive his blessing, and brought their children with them. After many years of ill-health he died on 31 March 1618, in the sixty-second year of his age and the forty-first year of his ministry, and was buried in the choir of the parish church. By after generations he was spoken of as ‘famous and worthy.’

== Family ==
He married, first, Martha, daughter of James Baron, provost of Edinburgh, by whom he had three sons, who all became ministers, and a daughter, who became wife of John Gillespie, minister of Alva, and was mother of Patrick, Lilias and George Gillespie. Martha suffered health problems, possibly with her mental health. He married, secondly, a daughter of John Barroun of Kinnaird in Fife. She may have been a Rollock.

He married

- (1) Martha (died 13 August 1601), daughter of James Barron, Provost of Edinburgh, and had issue —
  - James, served heir 9 October 1618;
  - Lilias, born 1590-1 (married John Gillespie, minister of Kirkcaldy);
  - Adam, born May 1594, minister of New Abbey, Kirkcudbrightshire, whose son Patrick Simson was Moderator in 1695.
  - a son who became a minister in Ireland, was killed by rebels, and whose widow got relief from the Presbytery of Linlithgow 5 July 1643;
  - Janet (married, contracted 18 July 1608, Henry Talpe, burgess of Kinghorn);
  - Isabel, had a "maiden bairn" by Henry, third son of William, first Lord Cranstoun, who was decerned 29 July 1617 to marry her, but decreet was reduced 31 July 1618 :
- (2) a daughter of John Barroun of Kinnaird and Elizabeth Learmonth of the Balcomie family, she survived him.

== Works ==
His publications were:

- ‘A Short Compend of the History of the first Ten Persecutions moved against Christians,’ Edinburgh, 1613–16.
- ‘A Short Compend of the Growth of the Heresies of the Roman Anti-christ,’ Edinburgh, 1616.

These treatises were corrected and republished with the title of ‘The History of the Church since the Days of our Saviour Jesus Christ until the Present Age,’ by the author's brother (London, 1624).

== Bibliography ==
- Scott's Fasti
- Life, by his brother, the minister of Dalkeith (Wodrow Soc.), Select Biographies, vol. i.
- manuscript Life by Wodrow (Wod. MSS. University of Glasgow).]
- Edin. Counc. Reg.
- Inq. Ret. Gen., 781
- Reg. of Deeds, cxci., 141
- Edin. Com. Dec.
- Wodrow's Select Biog., 65-126
- The levitical family of Simson; I. the founding of the house, 1529(?)
