= John Davidson (reformer) =

Scottish church leader (c. 1549 – 1603)

- John Davidson preaching to the Assembly

Personal details
- Born: 1549 Dunfermline
- Died: 1603 (aged 53–54) Prestonpans
- Denomination: Church of Scotland
- Education: St Leonard's College

John Davidson (c.1549–1603) was born in Dunfermline, where his parents owned property in houses and lands. He entered St Leonard's College, St Andrews, in 1567, and after graduating, became a regent of the college, pursuing the study of theology. Being introduced to John Knox, he set himself to advance the cause of the Reformation, and one of his earliest services was the production of a play intended to expose the errors of Romanism, which was acted in Knox's presence. In 1573 there appeared from his pen Ane Breif Commendation of Uprightness, a poem in praise of Knox, with accompanying verses on the Reformer's death. Soon after, another poetical tract was issued anonymously, under the title of Ane Dialog, or Mutitait Talking betwixt a Clerk and ane Courteour, concerning foure Parische Kirks till ane Minister. This was a reflection on the Regent Morton, who had been uniting parishes under one minister to secure part of the benefices for himself. The Regent was deeply offended. Printer and poet were put in prison. On his liberation, he lay hid for a time at Kinzeaneleugh, Ayrshire, the residence of his friend Robert Campbell. He then retired to the Continent, where he remained for about three years. In 1577, at the urgent solicitation of the General Assembly, Morton permitted his return, and in 1579 he became minister of Liberton. In June 1581, Morton being under sentence of death was visited by Davidson. Going for a time to London, he became known at the English Court, and from the earnest style of his preaching was called the thunderer. Returning, he did not resume his charge at Liberton, but officiated in various places. and acted as minister of the Second Charge of Holyrood. In 1595 he became minister Prestonpans, and built a church and manse at his own expense. He vigorously resented the proposal that certain of the clergy should sit and vote in Parliament, and words that he then uttered were often repeated : "Busk him, busk him as bonnily as ye can, and bring him in as fairly as ye will, we see him well eneuch, we see the horns of his mitre." He was summoned before King James at Holyrood, and committed to Edinburgh Castle, but released, and allowed to return home, though interdicted from going beyond the bounds of his parish. He died in September 1604.

== Early life ==
John Davidson (1549?–1603), church leader, was born about 1549 at Dunfermline in Fifeshire, where his parents owned some property in houses and lands. He entered St. Leonard's College, St. Andrews, in 1567, and after graduating became a regent of the college, prosecuting also the study of theology. Becoming acquainted with John Knox he set himself to advance the cause of the Reformation, and one of his earliest services was the composing of a play, which was acted in presence of Knox, and was intended to expose the system of Romanism. Soon after he published a poem entitled Ane breif commendation of Uprichtness, founded on the notabill document of Goddis michty protectioun in preseruing his maist upricht Servand and fervent Messenger of Christi Euangell, Iohne Knox. This poem is given at length in the appendix to M'Crie's Life of Knox, and in Dr. Charles Rogers's Three Scottish Reformers. Soon after another poem was printed privately, Ane Dialog or Mutuall Talking betuix a Clerk and ane Courteour, concerning youre parische kirks till Ane Minister (1570). This was a reflection on the regent Morton, who had been uniting parishes under one minister to secure part of the benefice for himself. When Morton heard of it Davidson was sentenced to imprisonment, but was soon liberated. He was obliged, however, to hide himself somewhere in Argyllshire, whence he fled to the continent, continuing in exile for three years. Davidson studied at the University of Basel from around 1575. He upset Queen Elizabeth by his preaching and was therefore expelled from England.

== Return from Ayrshire ==
In 1577 Morton allowed him to return, and in 1579 he became minister of Liberton near Edinburgh. In June 1581, when Morton was under sentence of death and on the eve of ignominious execution, Davidson and another minister went to him, but found him, to their surprise and joy, at one with them in his religious experience and hopes. He begged Davidson to forgive him, and assured him of his forgiveness for what he had said against him in his book. Davidson was moved to tears, and a very affecting farewell followed.

In 1582 he was presented to James VI, who had lately assumed the reins of government. To the king's desire to restore prelacy Davidson was always strenuously opposed. This led to much painful collision between them. Few men have ever spoken more freely to kings. Davidson would now reprove him for swearing, now hold him by the sleeve to prevent his going away, now remind him that in the church he was not king but a private Christian, and now beg for the ministers the undisturbed right to reprove sinners. The king, much though he enjoyed an ecclesiastical tussle, disliked him both for his church views and his plain speaking.

In 1582, when Montgomery, bishop of Glasgow, was ordered by the general assembly to be deposed, Davidson was appointed to pronounce sentence of excommunication upon him, which he did in his own church at Liberton. An attempt was made to seize Davidson's person, but the raid of Ruthven intervened, and he escaped. The Earl of Gowne was executed on 2 May for his alleged involvement in the failed coup, although he appears to have been doing his best to leave the country via Dundee at the time. On the same day, James Carmichael, minister of Haddington, Patrick Galloway, minister of Perth, John Davidson, minister of Liberton, and Andrew Polwart, minister of Cadder, fled to England to join Melville in exile, having been summoned before the privy council for involvement in the conspiracy. In 1583 he corresponding with the puritan John Field to promote English Presbyterianism. Going for a time to London, via Newcastle in 1584, he became known at the English court, and from the earnest style of his preaching was called the thunderer.

== Davidson and King James ==
King James passed the Black Acts in 1584, putting the Church of Scotland under royal control with two bishops. This met vigorous opposition and he was forced to concede that the General Assembly should continue to run the church, but Presbyterians reacting against the formal liturgy were opposed by an Episcopalian faction. When Davidson returned from London he did not resume his charge at Liberton, but officiated for a time here and there, at one time acting as one of the ministers of Holyrood.

The feeling in the Scottish church against prelacy was much intensified by injudicious methods used to recommend it. Among these was the sermon preached by Richard Bancroft at St. Paul's Cross at the opening of parliament in February 1588–9, in which the divine right of bishops as a higher order than presbyters was maintained, and the orders of the Scottish church disparaged. Davidson at the request of the presbytery of Edinburgh published a reply, which was suppressed by order of the king. It became very scarce. Part of it is republished in the Miscellany of the Wodrow Society.

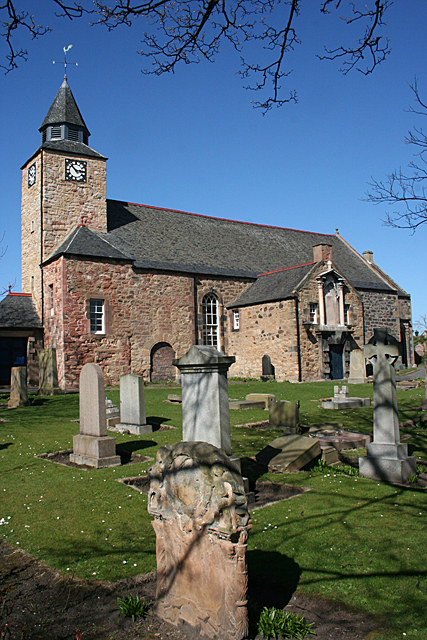
Prestonpans Parish Kirk built by Davidson at his own expense

The king being opposed to the strict observance of Sunday required by the church, resolved, after his marriage with Anne of Denmark, that the queen should be crowned on a Sunday. This was opposed strongly by Davidson and other clergy, but the king carried his point, and the coronation took place on 17 May 1590. Preaching in Edinburgh on 6 June in presence of the king, Davidson addressed a strong admonition to him. He also paid the king a pastoral visit at Holyrood with two other ministers, and made several complaints against his proceedings. He continued the same bold course, but, the king having commanded the provost of Edinburgh to prohibit his preaching again in the city, he made a kind of apology. But his brethren were uncomfortable under his bold language, and it was deemed better that he should remove from the city. In 1596 he became minister of Prestonpans, ten miles from Edinburgh, where there was no church. Davidson erected a church at his own expense, and likewise a manse, which stood for more than a hundred and fifty years and was the birthplace of Dr. Alexander Carlyle.

In 1595 the terror of Philip II of Spain, which had subsided for a time after the destruction of his armada, began to spread anew over the country. The privy council imposed a tax, to raise which the consent of the general assembly was necessary. On the motion of Davidson a resolution was passed by the assembly that humiliation for sin was the first and best preparation against a hostile invasion of the country. The king was alarmed and made some concession. Carrying out their resolution the assembly met in order that the ministers might humble themselves before God. Davidson preached on the sins of the ministry. An extraordinary scene took place, the whole assembly being melted into tears. No discourse had ever been known to produce such an impression.

In February 1599 a proposal of the king that certain of the clergy should sit and vote in parliament was being discussed in the synod of Fife. Davidson opposed the scheme as an insidious attempt to introduce prelacy, saying, in words that became famous afterwards, ‘Busk him, busk him, as bonnily as ye can, and bring him in as fairly as ye will, we see him well enough, we see the horns of his mitre.’

The contest with the king was carried on on various subsequent occasions, Davidson making himself obnoxious to James by his firm protests against the royal measures. At one time royal commissioners appeared before the presbytery of Haddington requiring them to prosecute him for his misdemeanors and offences. The presbytery, after consideration and inquiry, let the matter drop. Unable to attend the general assembly at Burntisland in 1601, he wrote a letter warning his brethren against the devices of Delilah and the recent execution of James Wood of Boniton. For this he was summoned before the king at Holyrood, and committed to Edinburgh Castle. Released next day, he was allowed to return to his parish, but interdicted from going beyond it. Various attempts were made to get this interdict removed, especially when the king, after succeeding to the English throne, was passing through Prestonpans on his way to England on 5 April 1603. A deputation met him there, and entreated his clemency for the minister, who had long been sick. ‘I may be gracious,’ said the king, ‘but I will be also righteous, and until he confesses his fault he may lie and rot there.’

== Death and legacy ==
Davidson died soon after, about the end of August 1603. With all his boldness of spirit and license of speech, Davidson was an accomplished scholar, and a very fervent and powerful preacher. He had formed the plan of a history of Scottish martyrology, but did not complete it. He wrote Memorials of his Time, a Diary of which Calderwood made use in his history. Other treatises likewise are referred to by Calderwood. His most useful prose work was a catechism with the title Some Helps for Young Scholars in Christianity, 1602. His poems were collected in 1829, and printed in a small volume. They are reprinted in Rogers's Three Scottish Reformers.

== Family ==
He left a widow (name unknown). His effects were devoted to the support of the school which he founded.

== Works ==
- Ane Breif Commendation of Uprightness (Sanct And., 1573)
- Dialogue betwixt a Cleric and a Courteour (Sanct And., 1573: D. Bancroft's Rashnes in rayling against the Church of Scotland (Edinburgh, 1590)
- Memorial of the Life arid Death of Robert Campbell of Kinzeaneleugh, and his Wife (Edinburgh, 1595)
- Some Helpes for Young Scholars in Christianity (Edinburgh, 1602)
- Discover ie of the Unnatural and Traitorous Conspiracy of Scottish Papists (Preface), (Edinburgh, 1593)
- His Apologie and Several Letters (Calderwood's Hist., v., vi.)
- Short Form of Morning and Evening Prayer, etc. (Wodrow Miscell.). His Poems were reprinted in 1829. He wrote also Memorials of his Time, a diary of which Calderwood made use in his History.

== Bibliography ==
- Row's, Calderwood's, and Cunningham's Hists.
- Acts Pari., iv.
- Wodrow Miscell.
- Livingston's Charac
- Booke of the Kirk
- M'Crie's Melville, ii.
- Rogers' Three Scottish Reformers
