= William Harlaw =

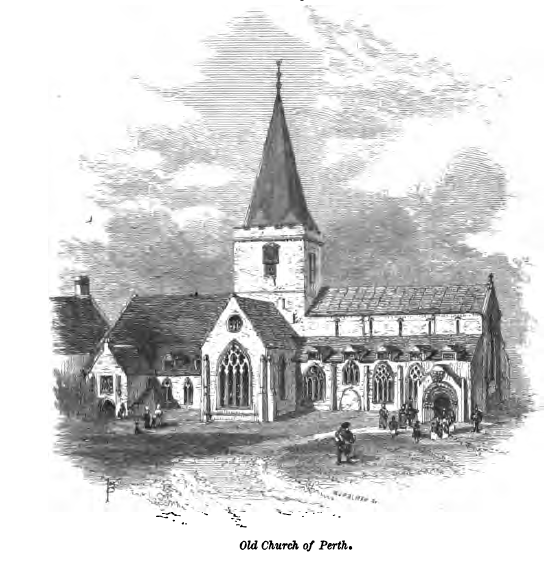
Old Church of Perth

William Harlaw (c.1510–1578) was an early minister of the Church of Scotland following the Reformation.

== Life ==
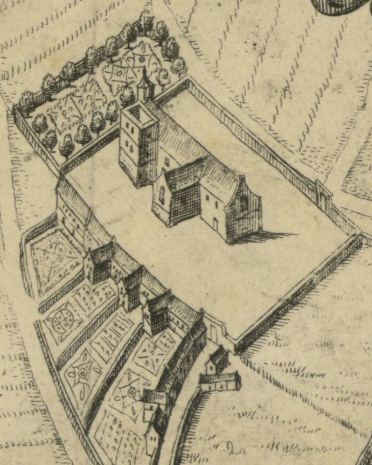
St Cuthbert's and its surroundings in the 17th century

He was born in the Canongate district of Edinburgh around 1510 and originally plied a trade as a tailor. Around 1550 he began to take a strong interest in the Reformation of the English Church and left Edinburgh and went to London to learn more of the movement. He presumably had a degree of religious training (possibly self-taught) as he managed to first obtain a post as a deacon and then as chaplain to King Edward VI. On the death of the King in 1553 he returned to Edinburgh and started preaching privately (in the Protestant manner) to people in their own houses. He was reprimanded for preaching in Dumfries in 1558.

In the spring of 1559, together with John Christison, he began preaching at the Old Kirk of Perth. Mary of Guise, Regent of Scotland, sent word to Lord Ruthven the provost of Perth, to suppress this activity. Ruthven expressed a lack of power in this matter causing Mary to write to James Halyburton Provost of the neighbouring town of Dundee to apprehend Methven. He instead sent word to Methven to go into hiding. Angered, Mary sent a group of men from Edinburgh to Dundee, Perth and Montrose, each of which appeared to be preaching the new religion. The bishops persuaded Mary to change the law such that the offenders could be prosecuted as rebels under state law, rather than prosecuting under church law (thus avoiding blame on their own heads).

On 10 May 1559 Harlaw was instructed to appear before Mary at her court in Stirling, along with John Christison, Paul Methuen and John Willcock. The men had to explain themselves for preaching in the towns of Perth, Dundee and Montrose. He was guilty of being a rebel but his punishment is unclear. Events had been overtaken by John Knox in Edinburgh, who from May 1559 was openly preaching the new religion.

Mary of Guise's power was fading fast and she retreated to Leith where she died in June 1560. This paved the way for the wider expansion of the Reformation in Scotland. Harlaw became the first appointed Protestant minister of the newly non-Catholic St Cuthbert's Church, Edinburgh in the summer of 1560 (possibly beginning before Mary of Guise's death. He is known to have sat on the very first General Assembly of the Church of Scotland on 20 December 1560 (presided over by John Knox.

In June 1566, Robert, Commendator of Holyroodhouse proposed that Harlaw should be replaced, owing to his lack of formal training, but his parishioners already loved him, and objected to the change. King James VI formally designated him as "vicar" of St Cuthbert's on 6 February 1572. A contemporary quote relating to Harlaw said although "not verie lernit, yitt his doctrine was plaine, sound, and worthie of Commendation".

He died in 1578. His position at St Cuthberts was filled by the infamous Robert Pont who had been assisting him since 1576.

== Family ==
His son Nathaniel Harlaw was minister of Ormiston.
