= Robert Pont =

Scottish minister

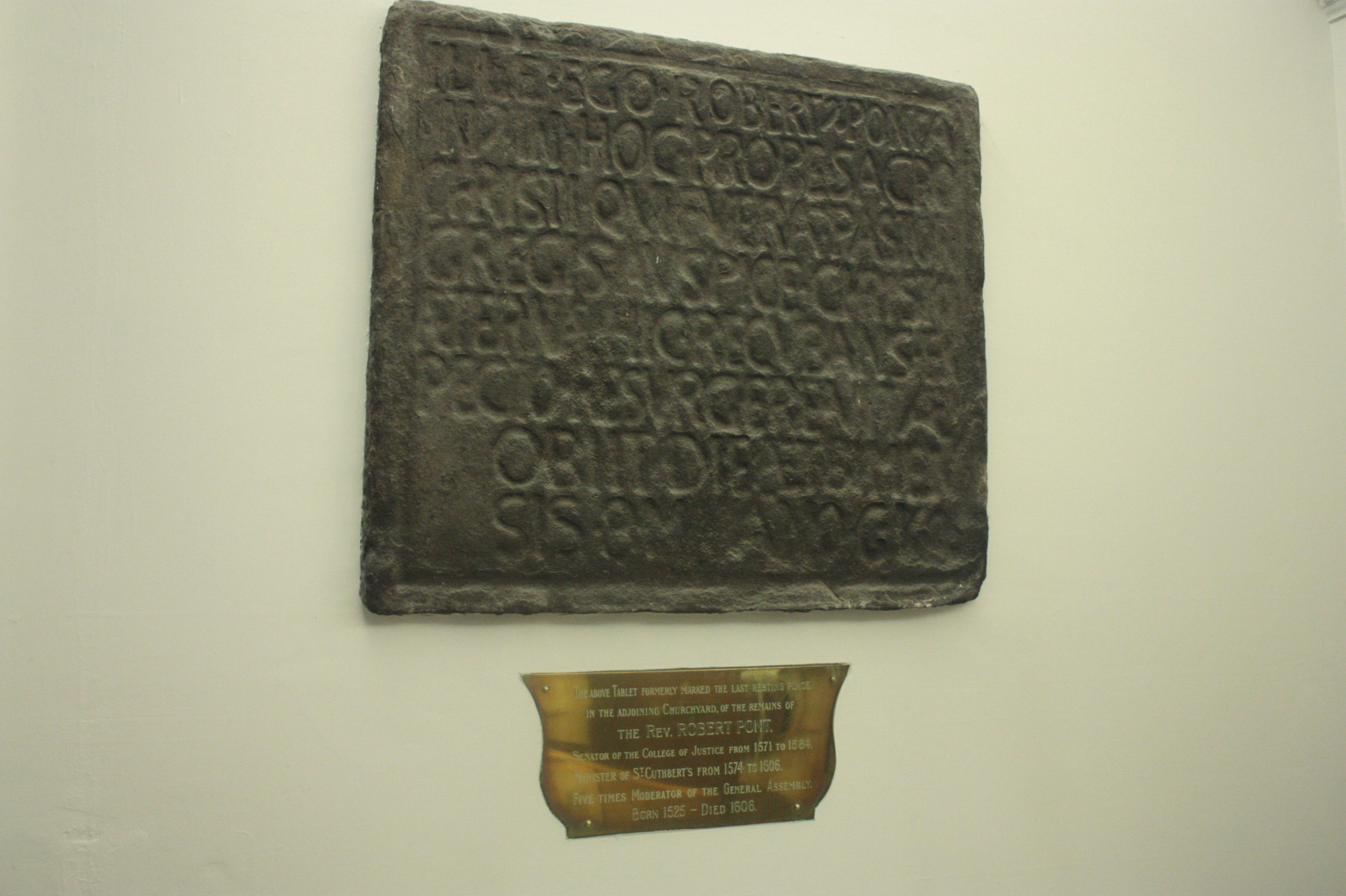
- Memorial at St Cuthbert's

Personal details
- Born: 1524
- Died: 8 May 1606

minister of Dunblane
- In office 2 July 1562 – 1562

minister of Dunkeld
- In office 1562 – 26 June 1563

commissioner for Inverness, Moray, and Banff (from 1568 non-Gaelic only from Elgin)
- In office 26 June 1563 – 19 March 1574

Senator in College of Justice
- In office 12 January 1572 – 22 May 1584

St Cuthbert's (Collegiate charge [junior])
- In office 1574 – 29 December 1578

minister of St Cuthbert's
- In office 29 December 1578 – after 17 October 1581

minister of St Andrews
- In office after 17 October 1581 – 1583

minister of St Cuthbert's
- In office 1583 – 15 November 1602

Bishop/Commissioner of Caithness
- In office 1587–1590

Commissioner of Orkney
- In office 1590–1601

Moderator of the General Assembly (5 times)
- In office July 1570 – close
- In office August 1575 – close
- In office April 1581 – close
- In office October 1583 – close
- In office March 1596 – close
- In office April 1597 – close

Robert Pont (the abbreviated form of Kylpont or Kynpont) (1529–1606) was a Church of Scotland minister, judge and reformer. He was a church minister, commissioner and a Senator of the College of Justice.

His translation of the Helvetian Confession was ordered to be printed by the General Assembly. Pont's legal skill allowed him to be made Provost of Trinity College, and through the influence of Morton, but with the consent of the Assembly, he accepted a seat in the Court of Session in 1572. Working for the church, he assisted in the preparation of the Second Book of Discipline. He protested so prominently against the Black Acts that he was compelled for a time to take refuge in England. On returning with Angus and other Protestant Lords, he resumed his ministerial duty at St. Cuthbert's. Among other writings, he prepared for the Assembly three sermons against sacrilege and also published a revised edition of the Psalms, and a Latin treatise on the "Union of the two Kingdoms," in 1604. He died in 1606.

== Early life ==
Pont was born in Culross in 1524, to Robert Kynpont and Katherine Masterton.

In 1543 he began studying at St Leonard's College at the University of St. Andrews where he gained a degree of Master of Theology. On completing the course, he is then said to have studied canon and civil law in Europe. However, nothing is definitely known of his career until 1559, when he returned to St. Andrews and acted as an elder of the kirk (church) session there.

== Reformer ==
As a commissioner representing St. Andrews, Robert Pont was present at the very first meeting of the General Assembly of the Church of Scotland, held in Edinburgh on 20 December 1560. He was one of twenty, within the diocese of St. Andrews, declared by the General Assembly to be qualified for ministry and teaching. He was chosen one of a committee to revise the Book of Discipline, printed in 1561. At a meeting of the General Assembly in July 1562, Pont was appointed to minister the word and sacraments at Dunblane, and in December of the same year he was appointed minister of Dunkeld. He was also in the same year nominated, along with Alexander Gordon, as a candidate for the post of bishop of Galloway, but the election did not proceed.

On 26 June 1563, Pont was appointed commissioner of the General Assembly to the northern coastal areas of Moray, Inverness, and Banff. After visiting, he confessed his inability, on account of his ignorance of Gaelic, to carry out his duties; but on the understanding that he was not to be in charge of Gaelic-speaking churches, he accepted a renewal. To the general assembly in 1564, and printed in 1565, Pont contributed six metrical psalms; and at a meeting of the general assembly in December 1566 his translation of the Helvetic Confession was ordered to be printed.

On 13 January 1567 he was presented to the parsonage and vicarage of Birnie, Banffshire. By the assembly which met in December 1567 he was commissioned to execute sentence of excommunication against Adam Bothwell, bishop of Orkney, for performing the marriage ceremony between the Earl of Bothwell and Mary Queen of Scots; by that in July 1568 he was appointed one of a committee to revise the Treatise of Excommunication originally penned by John Knox; and by that in 1569 he was named one of a committee to proceed against the Earl of Huntly for his adherence to popery.

By the 1569 assembly, a petition was presented to the regent James Stewart, 1st Earl of Moray and council that Pont might be appointed where his labours might be more fruitful than in Moray; and in July 1570 he also asked the assembly to be relieved of his commission, but was requested to continue until the next assembly. At the assembly of July 1570 he acted as moderator. On 27 June 1571 he was appointed Provost of Trinity College, near Edinburgh. He attended the convention which met at Leith in January 1571–2, and following this meeting he was permitted to accept the office of Senator of the College of Justice (also later known as a Lord of Session), given to him by the regent John Erskine, Earl of Mar on account of his knowledge of the laws.

Pont was, along with John Wynram, commissioned by Knox to communicate his last wishes to the general assembly which met at Perth in 1572. In 1573 he received a pension out of the thirds of the diocese of Moray. At the assembly which met in August of this year he was berated for non-residence in Moray; and at the assembly held in March 1574 he resigned his office in favour of George Douglas. The same year he was translated to the second in charge of St. Cuthbert's Church, Edinburgh with William Harlaw in first charge. On Harlaw's death in 1578, Pont rose to the first charge .

== Leader in the Kirk ==
Pont was chosen Moderator of the General Assembly of the Church of Scotland, which met in August 1575; and from this time he occupied a prominent position in the assembly. He was a member of nearly all its major committees and commissions.

Pont was one of those who, after the fall of the regent James Douglas, 4th Earl of Morton in 1578, accompanied the English ambassador to Stirling to arrange an agreement between the faction of Morton and the faction of Atholl and Argyll; and he was also one of those who, nominally at the request of the king James VI, convened in Stirling Castle, on 22 December 1578, for the preparation of articles of a Book of Policy, later known as the Second Book of Discipline. He again acted as moderator at the assembly of 1581. After October of the same year he, on invitation, became minister at St. Andrews; but for want of stipend he was in 1583 relieved of this charge, and returned to that of St. Cuthbert's, Edinburgh. He took a prominent part in the proceedings in 1582 against Robert Montgomery in regard to his appointment to the bishopric of Glasgow; and at a meeting of the privy council on 12 April he protested in the name of the presbyteries of Edinburgh, Stirling, and Dalkeith that the cause was within the jurisdiction of the kirk.

In 1583 Pont was appointed one of a commission for collecting the acts of the assembly; and the same year was directed, along with David Lindsay and John Davidson, to admonish the king to beware of innovations in religion. At the general assembly held at Edinburgh in October of the same year, he again acted as moderator. When the acts of parliament regarding the jurisdiction of the kirk were proclaimed at the market cross of Edinburgh on 25 May 1584, Pont, along with Walter Balcanqual, made a public protest. For this he was on the 27th deprived of his seat on the bench; and immediately he took refuge in England. On 7 November he was summoned by the Privy Council to appear before it on 7 December, and give reasons for not subscribing the "obligation of ecclesiastical conformity"; shortly before this he had returned to Scotland, and had been put in ward, but not long afterwards he received his liberty. His position in the courts was filled by John Graham, Lord Hallyards.

In May 1586 Pont again acted as Moderator of the General Assembly. In 1587 he was appointed by the king to the bishopric of Caithness; but, on his referring the matter to the General Assembly, they refused to ratify the appointment, on the ground that the office was "not agreeable to the word of God". The same year he was appointed by the assembly as one of a committee for collecting the various acts of parliament against papists, with a view to their confirmation on the king's coming of age; and in 1588 he was appointed one of a committee to confer with six of the king's council regarding the best methods of suppressing Catholicism and extending the influence of the kirk; and also one of a commission to visit the northern parts, from the River Dee to the diocese of Caithness inclusive, with a view to the institution of proceedings against Catholics, the planting of kirks with qualified ministers, and the deposition of all ministers who were unqualified, whether in life or doctrine.

== Last years ==
On 15 October 1589, Pont was appointed by the king as one of a commission to legally judge beneficed persons (clergy). He was one of those sent by the Presbytery of Edinburgh to hold a conference with the king at the Edinburgh Tolbooth on 8 June 1591 regarding the king's objections to criticisms from the pulpit; and replied to the king's claim of sovereign judgment in all things by affirming that there was a judgment above his—namely "God's—put in the hand of the ministry". On 8 December he was deputed, along with two other ministers, to go to Holyrood Palace, when they urged the king to have the Scriptures read at dinner and supper. At the meeting of the Assembly at Edinburgh on 21 May 1592 he was appointed one of a committee to work on articles with reference to Popery and its authority.

When the Act of Abolition granting pardon to the Earls of Huntly, Angus, Erroll, and other Catholics on certain conditions was on 26 November 1593 communicated by the king to the ministers of Edinburgh, Pont proposed that it should be disannulled rather than revised. He again acted as moderator of the assembly which met in March 1596. On 16 May 1597 he was appointed one of a commission to converse with the king; and he was also a member of the renewed commission in the following year. At the General Assembly which met in March 1597–8 he was one of the main supporters of the proposal of the king that the ministry, as the third estate of the realm, should have its own vote in parliament.

By the assembly which met at Burntisland on 12 May 1601, Pont was appointed to revise the translation of the Psalms in metre. On 15 November of the following year he was relieved of "ordinary teaching".

He died on 8 May 1606, in his eighty-second year, and was buried in the churchyard of St Cuthbert's Church, Edinburgh. He had had a tombstone prepared for himself, with epitaphs written by himself, but this was removed and another set up by his widow, Mary Smyth, which remained by a Privy Council decision in June 1607. This now stands on the western wall of the entrance lobby to the church, above an explanatory brass plaque.

== Legends ==
Robert Wodrow stated that Pont had a "discovery" (correct prediction) of the date of Queen Elizabeth's death, which he told to James VI. It was attributed either to a revelation or to Pont's knowledge of astrology.

== Works ==
Some of Pont's prominent works were: the metrical psalms (1565); his translation of the Helvetic Confession (1566); his contributions to the Second Book of Discipline; his calendar and preface to Thomas Bassandyne's edition of the English Bible (1579); his commendatory verses to Archbishop Adamson's Catechism (1581) and to the Schediasmata of Sir Hadrian Damman (i.e. Adrian van Damman) (1590); and his lines on Robert Rollock. He wrote the Animadversions of Offences conceaved upon the Acts of Parliament made in the Yeare 1584 in the Moneth of May, presented by the Commissioners of the Kirk to the King's Majesty at the Parliament of Linlithgow in December 1585. Pont was also the author of:

- Parvulus Catechismus quo examinari possunt juniores qui ad sacram cœnam admittuntur, St. Andrews, 1573.
- Three Sermons against Sacrilege, 1599 (against the spoiling of the patrimony of the kirk and undertaken at the request of the assembly in 1591).
- A Newe Treatise on the Right Reckoning of Yeares and Ages of the World, and Mens Liues, and of the Estate of the last decaying age thereof, this 1600 year of Christ (erroneously called a Yeare of Iubilee), which is from the Creation the 5548 yeare; containing sundrie singularities worthie of observation, concerning courses of times and revolutions of the Heaven, and reformation of Kalendars and Prognostications, with a Discourse of Prophecies and Signs, preceding the last daye, which by manie arguments appeareth now to approach, Edinburgh, 1599. A more ample version in Latin under the title De Sabbaticorum annorum Periodis Chronologia, London, 1619; 2nd ed. 1623.
- De Unione Britanniæ, seu de Regnorum Angliæ et Scotiæ omniumque adjacentum insularum in unam monarchiam consolidatione, deque multiplici ejus unionis utilitate, dialogus, Edinburgh, 1604.

David Buchanan, author of De Scriptoribus Scotis and relative of historian George Buchanan, also mentions manuscripts not now known to be extant.

== Family ==
Pont was married two or three times. By his first wife, whose name is unclear, he had two sons and four daughters: Zachary, minister of Bower in Caithness, who married Margaret Knox, daughter of John Knox; Timothy Pont, minister of Dunnet; Helen, married to Adam Blackadder of Blairhall, grandfather of Rev. John Blackadder; Margaret, married to Alexander Borthwick of 'Nether Learnie' (Leny); Catherine, who married Patrick Dunbar, prebendary of the Chapel Royal at Stirling; and Beatrix, married to Charles Lumsden, minister of Duddingston Kirk.

In 1587, Pont made an antenuptial agreement with a Sara Denholm, concerning a property on Edinburgh's Castlehill, but since in 1592 he provided an income from that property for his daughters Catherine and Beatrix, it is uncertain if this marriage took place. By his last wife, Margaret Smyth, he had three sons: James, Robert, and Jonathan.

His second son Timothy Pont (1565?–1614?) was a mathematician, surveyor, and "the first projector of a Scottish atlas."
