= Archibald Simson =

Scottish church leader (1564?–1628)

Archibald Simpson

Personal details
- Born: Archibald Simpson; 1564 Dunbar
- Died: 1628 (aged 63–64)
- Denomination: Church of Scotland

Archibald Simpson (1564-1628) was a Christian minister, author and poet in Scotland.

== Early life ==
Archibald Simson, Scottish divine, was born in 1564, most likely in Dunbar, to Andrew Simson and Violet Simson. His mother, Violet, was the sister of Patrick Adamson, archbishop of St. Andrews. Archibald was one of ten children, eight of which either became, or married, Christian ministers; one of his brothers was Patrick Simson.

Archibald graduated from the University of St. Andrews in 1585 with an MA, and in the following year became assistant to his father at Dalkeith in Midlothian. He was made clerk to the Presbytery on 10 October 1588 and was ordained on 3 June 1591. On his father's death, he succeeded in the charge. He acquired some fame as a poet and attracted the notice of Sir John Maitland of Thirlestane, Lord Chancellor of Scotland. Through this connection, Dalkeith was erected into a parish in 1592.

In 1615 he was violently assaulted by Robert Strachan of Musselburgh; as penance, Strachan had to stand in the churchyards of Dalkeith and Musselburgh on consecutive Sundays, barefoot and clad in sackcloth (Reg. Scottish Privy Council, 1613–16, p. 368).

== Family ==
Simson married:

- (1) Katherine Crichton (Edin. Beg., 1 Feb. 1604), who died before 10 Feb. 1607. They had three children -
  - Christian;
  - Elizabeth;
  - Jean
- (2) before 26 Sept, 1607, Elizabeth Stewart, who survived him.

== Political views ==
In the conflict between church and state Simson was found on the side of the theocratic Presbyterians. In 1605 he travelled to Aberdeen to take part in the General Assembly of Aberdeen which met in defiance of the royal wishes; he arrived too late to take part, but with several other ministers of his presbytery he declared, before departing homewards, his adherence to all the acts of the late general assembly (Calderwood, Hist. of Scottish Kirk, vi. 444). For this, he was summoned before the privy council, but dismissed on promising more moderate behaviour in future (Reg. of Scottish Privy Council, 1604-7, pp. 105–6). Notwithstanding, he was one of those who supported the five ministers who were brought to trial for treason in convening a general assembly in defiance of the king's prohibition (ib. p. 479; Calderwood, vi. 457).

In 1617 Simson again placed himself in opposition to the crown. A legal Act was brought forward in the Scottish parliament to the effect that ‘whatever his majesty should determine in the external government of the church, with the advice of the archbishops, bishops, and a competent number of the ministry, should have the force of law.’

The more independent of the clergy at once took fright, and on 27 June a meeting was hastily held, at which a protest was drawn up and signed by fifty-five ministers (including Simson), to the effect that the proposed statute was a violation of the fundamental rule of the Scottish church that changes of ecclesiastical law should be by the ‘advice and determination’ of general assemblies of the church. This document was to be presented to the king; however, to render the procedure as mild as possible, Peter Hewat was instructed to give King James a copy which contained only one signature - that of Simson, who had acted as secretary of the meeting (ib. 1616-1619, pp. xlviii-lvii, 166; Calderwood, vii. 253, 256). In consequence, the bill was not proceeded with in parliament, but the weight of the king's resentment fell on Simson and his confederates.

On 1 July Simson was summoned before the Court of High Commission, deprived of his charge, and confined to the town of Aberdeen. On 11 December he acknowledged his offence and obtained restoration to his charge (Reg. of Scottish Privy Council, 1616–19, pp. 183, 280; Calderwood, vii. 257, 260, 286). A summons was sent for his ‘recompearance’ before the same court, on 7 June 1620, which he avoided through the intercession of William, Earl of Morton (ib. vii. 444).

He died in December 1628 at Dalkeith.

== Works ==
Simson is known to written a number of works, including a biography of his brother Patrick. Simson may be credited with Ad Comitem Fermolodunensem Carmen, 1610, 4to, which has also been ascribed to his father, and he contributed a congratulatory poem in praise of James VI, entitled Philomela Dalkeithiensis, to the ‘Muses' Welcome,’ Edinburgh, 1618, fol. He has also been identified with the author of A Commentary or Exposition upon the Divine Second Epistle Generall written by St. Peter, plainly and pithily handled by A. Symson (London, 1632, 8vo), which is, however, more generally ascribed to his father. Archibald Simson's other works are:

- 1. Christes Testament unfolded; or seauen godlie and learned Sermons on our Lords seauen last Words spoken on the Cross, Edinburgh, 1620, 8vo.
- 2. Heptameron; the Seven Days; that is, Meditations and Prayers upon the Worke of the Lords Creation, St. Andrews, 1621, 8vo.
- 3. Samsons seaven Lockes of Haire allegorically expounded, St. Andrews, 1621, 8vo.
- 4. Hieroglyphica Animalium, Reptilium, Insectorum, &c. quæ in Scripturis Sacris inveniuntur,’ 2 tom. Edinburgh, 1622-4, 4to.
- 5. A Sacred Septenarie, or a Godly Exposition of the seven Psalmes of Repentance, London, 1623, 8vo.
- 6. Life of Patrick Simson, printed in Select Biographies, ed. W. K. Tweedie for the Wodrow Society, Edinburgh, 1845, 8vo.

Two of his works remain in manuscript in the Advocates' Library, Edinburgh:

- Historia Ecclesiastica Scotorum.
- Annales Ecclesiæ Scoticanæ (Sibbald, Repertory of Manuscripts in the Advocates' Library, p. 122).

Other works include:

- Christ's Seven Words upon the Cross (1620)
- Heptameron, the Seven Days (St Andrews, 1621)
- Samson's Seaven Lockes of Haire (St Andrews, 1621)
- Hieroglyphica Animalium Terrestrium, etc. (Edinburgh, 1622-4)
- A Sacred Septenarie (1623)
- Inducts Epistolas Petri (1632)
- Philomela Dalkeithiensis, a congratulatory poem in praise, of His Majesty [James VI.] (in The Muses' Welcome, Edinburgh, 1618)
- Letter to the High Commission, and an Apologetic (Orig. Lett., ii.)
- A Sermon on John v. 35 (Select Biog., i.)
- Life of Patrick Simson, ed. W. K. Tweedie, for the Wodrow Society, Edinburgh, 1845. Other works left in MSS., include Annales Ecclesiae Scotorum and Historia Ecclesiastica Scotorum, now in the Advocates' Library (1558-1625)

== Bibliography ==
[Scott's Fasti Eccl. Scot. I. i. 262; New Statistical Account, i. 518; Scot's Apologetic Narrative, p. 424.]

- Act. Beet. Univ. St And.
- Wodrow's MS. Biog., iv.
- Edin. Presb. and Test. Beg.
- Beg. Sec. Sig. and Assig.
- Lochleven Pap.
- Booke of the Kirk
- Spottiswood's, Row's, and Calderwood's Histories
- Scot's Stagg. State
- Forbes's Records
- Scot's Apol. Bel.
- M'Crie's Melville, ii.
- Orig. Lett.
- New Stat. Account
- Colleg. Ch. of Mid-Lothian
- Acts Pari., iii.
- The Simsons
