= Walter Balcanquhall =

Scottish clergyman

Walter Balcanquhall (1586? – 1645) was a Scottish clergyman who became a staunch royalist and supporter of the church policy of Charles I of England. He was chosen by James I as a delegate from the Church of Scotland to the Synod of Dort.

== Life ==
He was son of the Rev. Walter Balcanquhall, a strong presbyterian and was born in Edinburgh about 1586. He studied at the University of Edinburgh intending ultimately to take orders in the Church of England. In 1609 he graduated M.A.

He then entered at Pembroke College, Cambridge, where he passed B.D., and was admitted a Fellow on 8 September 1611. He was appointed one of James I's chaplains, and in 1617 he received the Mastership of the Savoy, London. In 1618 James sent him to the Synod of Dort and the university of Oxford conferred upon him the degree of D.D. His letters from Dort, which were addressed to Sir Dudley Carleton, are preserved in John Hales's Golden Remains.

In March 1624 he obtained the deanery of Rochester, when the incumbent Godfrey Goodman was made Bishop of Gloucester. In 1639 he was made Dean of Durham. On the death of the celebrated George Heriot on 12 February 1624, Balcanquhall was one of the three executors of his will and was assigned the major part in founding George Heriot's Hospital, for which he drew up the statutes in 1627.

In 1638 he revisited Scotland, as chaplain to the Marquis of Hamilton, the royal commissioner. Balcanquhall was very badly received. He was author of an apologetical narrative of the court proceedings under the title of His Majestie's Large Declaration concerning the Late Tumults in Scotland (1639). On 29 July 1641 he and others of kin with him were denounced by the Scottish parliament as 'incendiaries', and he was harshly treated. He retreated to Oxford and shared the waning fortunes of Charles I.

He later took refuge with the royalist Sir Thomas Middleton at Chirk Castle, Denbighshire, and died there on Christmas Day 1645. Sir Thomas Middleton erected a monument to him in the parish church of Chirk, with an epitaph composed for him by John Pearson, then Bishop of Chester.

From November 1651 to February 1652, a case was heard at the Committee for Compounding. Isaac Gilpin alleged that valuable plate and vestments from Durham Cathedral had been hidden from the state. The committee was asked to interrogate Lady Elizabeth Hammond, Walter Balcanquhall's widow: she had allegedly sent the valuables to the late Anthony Maxton, one of the former prebends of the cathedral, who had buried them in his garden.
