= History of the Scottish Episcopal Church =

The history of the Scottish Episcopal Church (Scottish Gaelic: Eaglais Easbaigeach na h-Alba) is traced by the church to ancient times. The Church today is a Christian denomination in Scotland and a member of the Anglican Communion. It has enjoyed a distinct identity and is neither Roman nor English. It is therefore not a Daughter Church in the Anglican communion.

== Origins of Christianity in Scotland ==
Saint Ninian conducted the first Christian mission to what is now southern Scotland.

In 563, St Columba travelled to Scotland with twelve companions, where according to his legend he first landed at the southern tip of the Kintyre peninsula, near Southend. However, being still in sight of his native land he moved further north up to the west coast of Scotland. He was granted land on the island of Iona off the west coast of Scotland which became the centre of his evangelising mission to the Picts. However, there is a sense in which he was not leaving his native people, as the Irish Gaels had been colonizing the west coast of Scotland for the previous couple of hundred years. His reputation as a holy man led to his role as a diplomat among the tribes; there are also many stories of miracles which he performed during his work to convert the Picts. He visited the pagan king Bridei, king of Fortriu, at his base in Inverness, winning the king's respect. He subsequently played a major role in the politics of the country. He was also very energetic in his evangelical work, and in addition to founding several churches in the Hebrides, he worked to turn his monastery at Iona into a school for missionaries. He was a renowned man of letters, having written several hymns and being credited with having transcribed 300 books personally. He died on Iona and was buried in the abbey he created.

The Scottish church would continue to grow in the centuries that followed. It was not until the 11th century, that St Margaret (Queen Consort of Malcolm III of Scotland) would strengthen the church's ties with the Roman Catholic Church and bring Scottish Christians into full communion with that church.

== Reformation ==
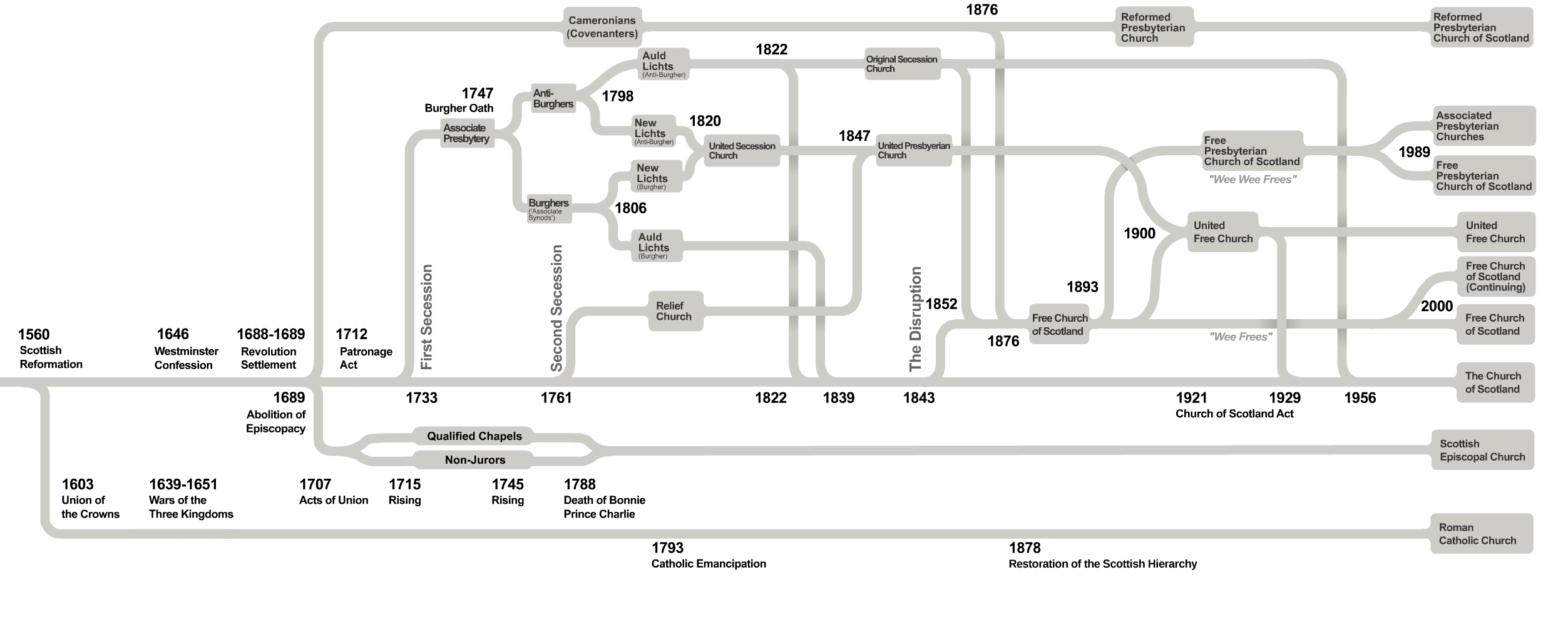
Timeline of Scottish Churches from 1560

The Scottish Reformation was touched off in 1560. At that point, the church in Scotland broke with Rome, in a process of Protestant reform led, among others, by John Knox. It reformed its doctrines and government, drawing on the principles of John Calvin to which Knox had been exposed while living in Switzerland. In 1560, the Scottish Parliament abolished papal jurisdiction and approved Calvin's Confession of Faith, but did not accept many of the principles laid out in Knox's First Book of Discipline, which argued, amongst other things, that all of the assets of the old church should pass to the new. The 1560 Reformation Settlement was not ratified by the crown for some years, and the question of church government also remained unresolved. In 1572, the acts of 1560 were finally approved by the young James VI, but the Concordat of Leith also allowed the crown to appoint bishops with the church's approval. John Knox himself had no clear views on the office of bishop, preferring to see them renamed as 'superintendents'; but in response to the new Concordat a Presbyterian party emerged headed by Andrew Melville, the author of the Second Book of Discipline.

The Scottish Episcopal Church had its origins in 1582 when the Church of Scotland rejected episcopal government (by bishops), and adopted full presbyterian government (by elders) and reformed theology. Scottish monarchs made repeated efforts to introduce bishops, and two church traditions began.

== Episcopal government maintained ==
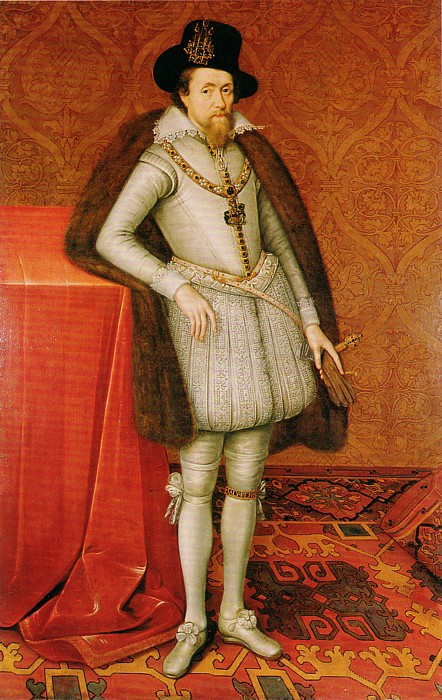
Portrait of James VI by John de Critz, circa 1606

In 1584, James VI of Scotland had the Parliament of Scotland pass the Black Acts bringing the Kirk under royal control with two bishops. This met vigorous opposition and he was forced to concede that the General Assembly should continue to run the church, but Presbyterians reacting against the formal liturgy were opposed by an Episcopalian faction. After acceding to the English throne in 1603 James stopped the General Assembly from meeting, then increased the number of Scottish Bishops and in 1618 held a General Assembly and pushed through Five Articles of Episcopalian practices which were widely boycotted. His son Charles I was crowned in St Giles Cathedral, Edinburgh, in 1633 with full Anglican rites. Subsequently, in 1637, Charles attempted to introduce a version of the Book of Common Prayer, written by Archbishop Laud (and which in part derived from the first of Cranmer's reformation books and was thus more likely to offend the Calvinistic Scots). When this was used in the King's presence in St. Giles, Edinburgh, it set off a revolt which became so uncontainable that it led to the Wars of the Three Kingdoms, beginning with the Bishops Wars and developing into the English Civil War.

When James VII fled the country in 1688, and the crown was offered jointly to his daughter Mary and her husband William of Orange, the Scottish bishops felt that since James VII had not actually abdicated, they were unable to take the oath of allegiance to William and Mary. In consequence, the national Church of Scotland was established in the presbyterian form, and the non-juring bishops and those loyal to them became a persecuted minority who were regarded as potential traitors.

However, the Comprehension Act 1690 allowed episcopalian incumbents, on taking the Oath of Allegiance, to retain their benefices, though excluding them from any share in the government of the Church of Scotland without a further declaration of presbyterian principles. Many 'non-jurors' also succeeded for a time in retaining the use of the parish churches.

The excluded bishops were slow to organize the episcopalian remnant under a jurisdiction independent of the state, regarding the then arrangements as provisional, and looking forward to a reconstituted national episcopal Church under a 'legitimate' sovereign (see Jacobitism). A few prelates, known as college bishops, were consecrated without sees, to preserve the succession rather than to exercise a defined authority. But at length the hopelessness of the Stuart cause and the growth of congregations outside of the establishment forced the bishops to dissociate canonical jurisdiction from royal prerogative and to reconstitute for themselves a territorial episcopate.

== From the Union of 1707 ==
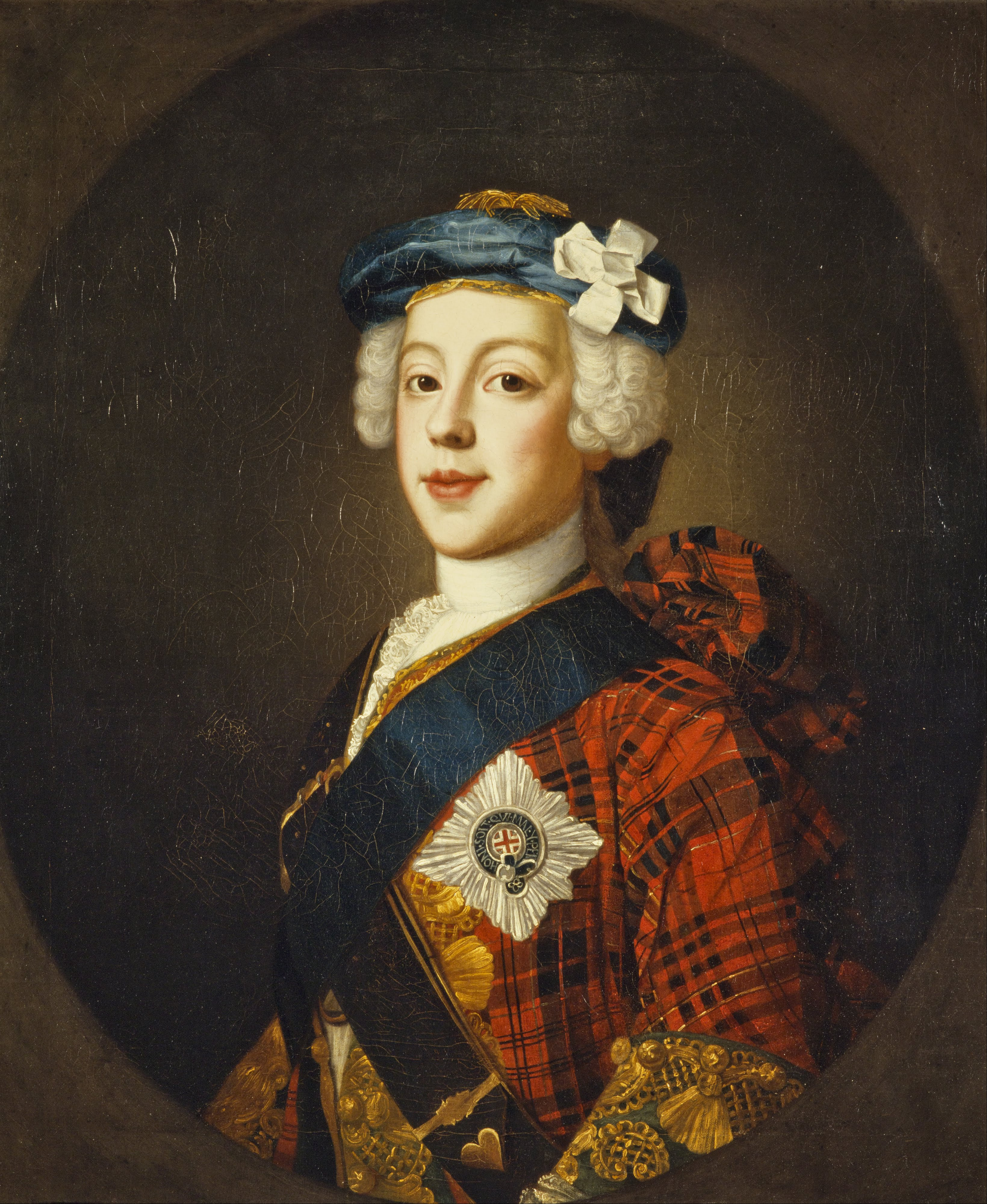
The death of Charles Edward Stuart led to better conditions for the growth of the church.

In 1707, Scotland and England were united into a single Kingdom of Great Britain. The Scottish Episcopalians Act 1711, which protects the Episcopal Communion, marks its virtual incorporation as a distinct society. But matters were still complicated by a considerable, though declining, number of episcopalian incumbents holding the parish churches. Moreover, the Jacobitism of the non-jurors provoked a state policy of repression in 1715 and 1745, and fostered the growth of new Hanoverian "qualified" congregations, served by clergy episcopally ordained but amenable to no bishop, who qualified themselves under the 1711 act. This act was further modified in 1746 and 1748 to exclude clergymen ordained in Scotland.

These causes reduced the Episcopalians, who included at the Revolution a large section of the people, to what is now, save in a few corners of the west and north-east of Scotland, a small minority. The official recognition of George III on the death of Charles Edward Stuart in 1788, removed the chief bar to progress but the Episcopal Church had been reduced to no more than four bishops and about forty priests. The qualified congregations were gradually absorbed. In 1792 the penal laws were repealed, but clerical disabilities were only finally removed in 1864.

The Book of Common Prayer came into general use at the Revolution. The Scottish Communion Office, compiled by the non-jurors in accordance with primitive models, has had a varying co-ordinate authority, and the modifications of the English liturgy adopted by the American Church were mainly determined by its influence.

Among the clergy of post-Revolution days the most eminent are John Sage, a well-known scholar; Bishop Rattray, liturgiologist; John Skinner, of Longside, author of Tullochgorum; Bishop Gleig, editor of the 3rd edition of the Encyclopædia Britannica; Dean Ramsay, author of Reminiscences of Scottish Life and Character; Bishop AP Forbes; GH Forbes, liturgiologist; and Bishop Charles Wordsworth.

The Church enabled the creation of the Episcopal Church in the United States of America by in 1784 consecrating in Aberdeen Samuel Seabury, the first American bishop, who had been refused consecration by the clergy in England.

There were 356 congregations, with a total membership of 124,335, and 324 working clergy in 1900. No existing ministry can claim regular historic continuity with the ancient hierarchy of Scotland, but the bishops of the Episcopal Church are direct successors of the prelates consecrated to Scottish sees at the Restoration.
