= Patrick Simson (minister) =

Church of Scotland clergyman

Patrick Simson or Sympson (1628–1715) was a Church of Scotland minister who served as Moderator of the General Assembly in 1695. He was Dean of the Faculty of Divinity at Glasgow University. At the time of his death in 1715 he was the acknowledged Father of the Church.

Robert Wodrow described him as "the last of the antediluvian Presbyterian ministers in this church".

== Life ==
He was born on 2 October 1628 the son of Rev. Adam Simson of New Abbey and his wife Margaret Spens. His paternal grandfather (after whom he was named) was the eminent churchman Patrick Simson. He was sent to Edinburgh for education under his maternal uncle Rev. George Gillespie who was then minister of Saint Giles Cathedral. Around 1644 he became private tutor to the family of Archibald Campbell, 1st Marquess of Argyll, a role he had for three years.

Despite a lack of any formal university degree, in November 1653 he was ordained as minister of Renfrew Parish Church south of Glasgow. In the upheavals of the 1660s he was deprived of office by an Act of Parliament in October 1662. In the "Indulgence" of Kilmacolm of 1672 he was reallowed to preach but the position at Renfrew was not then empty and he had to wait. In November 1678 he was reprimanded by the Privy Council for preaching outwith his parish without permission (the location of this is unclear). He was denounced as a "rebel" but allowed back fully as minister of Renfrew at the "toleration" in August 1687 and formally reaccepted by the Act of Parliament in April 1690.

In December 1690 he was created Dean of the Faculty of Divinity at Glasgow University and continued this role until 1696.

In 1695 he succeeded Rev. John Law as Moderator of the General Assembly of the Church of Scotland the highest position in the Scottish church.

He died in Renfrew on 24 October 1715.

== Family ==
In August 1654 he married Elizabeth Hay (d. 1662) daughter of his predecessor Rev. John Hay: Their children included:

- Sarah (b. 1655) died in infancy
- George (b. 1657) died in infancy
- Patrick Simson (1659–1688) died in the West Indies
- Agnes (b. 1662) married John Simson of Kirktonhall in West Kilbride, a Glasgow merchant and had 17 sons and no daughters.
- Elizabeth, twin of Agnes, died in infancy

Elizabeth died in childbirth giving birth to Agnes and Elizabeth. He next married Janet Peadie (d. 1714) daughter of James Peadie and widow of Robert Cullen, both Glasgow merchants. Their further children included:

- James (1665–1667)
- John Ramsay Professor of Divinity at Glasgow University
- Margaret (1669–1758) married James Montgomerie
- Rev. Matthew Simson of Pencaitland
- Anna (b. 1674) married Rev. John Paisley of Lochwinnoch
- Still born son (b. 1677)

== Publications ==
- Letter in Answer to Hackston's Ghost
- The Larger Reply
- Spiritual Songs or Holy Poems: A Garden of True Delight (6 vols.)
