= Spott, East Lothian =

Village in East Lothian, Scotland

Coordinates: 55.971°N 2.524°W

Spott
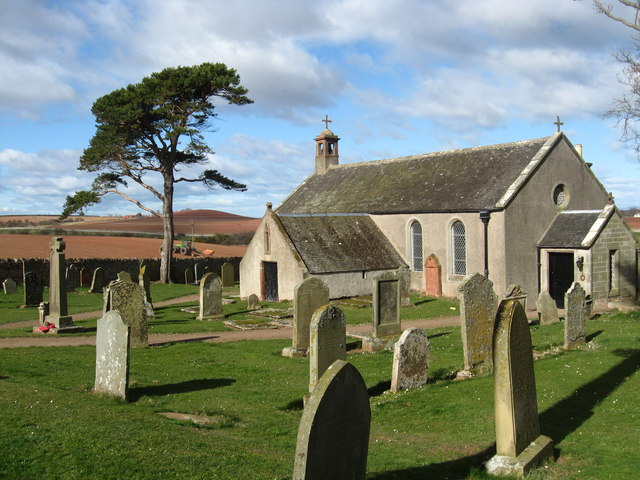
- Spott Parish Church

- Location within Scotland
- OS grid reference: NT673755
- Civil parish: Spott
- Council area: East Lothian Council
- Lieutenancy area: East Lothian
- Country: Scotland
- Sovereign state: United Kingdom
- Post town: DUNBAR
- Postcode district: EH42
- Dialling code: 01368
- Police: Scotland
- Fire: Scottish
- Ambulance: Scottish
- UK Parliament: East Lothian
- Scottish Parliament: East Lothian

Spott is a small village on the eastern fringes of East Lothian in Scotland, just over 2 miles (3.2 km) south-west of Dunbar. The village straddles an unclassified road leading from the main A1 highway at grid reference NT673755.

== History ==
There is believed to have been settlement in the area for over 1,500 years, and Spott is the site of many finds from the time of the Romans occupation of southern Scotland. An Anglian homestead is located at nearby Doon Hill.

Spott holds the dubious distinction of playing host to the last executions of the Scottish witch-hunts of the 17th and 18th centuries, when several alleged witches were executed at Spott Loan in October 1705. The first Battle of Dunbar in 1296, took place less than a mile from Spott. Before the second Battle of Dunbar in 1650, the Scots army, which vastly outnumbered Oliver Cromwell's army, camped at Doon Hill, just to the east of Spott, before leaving the high ground to meet Cromwell and defeat.

The war memorial in Spott dates from 1920 and was designed by Sir Robert Lorimer.

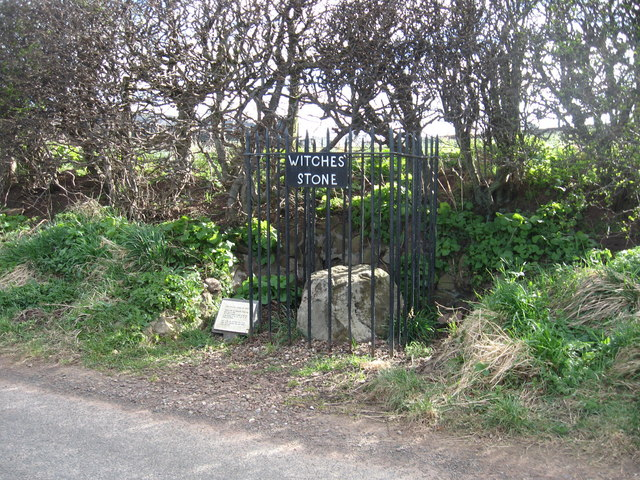
The Witches' Stone, by the road to the south-west of the village

== Spott House ==
Spott House has served as home to the proprietors of Spott since the 13th century. Elias de Spott swore fealty to King Edward I of England at Berwick-upon-Tweed in 1296. Over the centuries the estate has changed hands on several occasions and many eminent Haddingtonshire families – the Humes, Douglasses, Murrays and the Hays – have held the lands of Spott. The old Hume laird of Spott was killed in the fields at harvest time in September 1591 by the Homes of Ayton in a feud. His murderers fled to England, and suspicion fell on his son-in-law James Douglas.

His successor, Sir George Home entertained James VI, the Duke of Lennox, Sir Thomas Erskine, Sir Robert Kerr and others with a merry banquet at Spott in October 1600. An English visitor, William Eure, met the king in a chamber at Spott House.

Spott House was originally a tower house, constructed in 1640, the family home of the Hays of Yester. It is reputed to have housed Oliver Cromwell during the Battle of Dunbar (1650). In 1830, it was purchased by James Sprot, who had the house remodelled by William Burn, the pioneer of the Scots Baronial style. The estate remained in the Sprot family until 1947, when it was sold to Sir James Hope. It was eventually sold to the Lawrie family, who sold it to the Danish-born Lars Foghsgaard in 2000. Following Foghsgaard's return to Denmark the estate was put up for sale in 2010, but after three years with no purchaser, was broken up into smaller lots of land or buildings.

== Church ==
The origins of the church are somewhat vague, but it is certain there was a church here before the Reformation, when Spott Kirk was a prebendary of the Collegiate Church of Dunbar. Major repairs were carried out on the church in 1790 and again the following century giving its present cruciform shape. One arm of the church is an ancient burial vault. In 1570 the minister, John Kello, strangled his second wife, Margaret Thomson, in the manse before delivering 'a more than usually eloquent sermon'. He was executed (strangled then burnt) on 4 October 1570 in Edinburgh at the Gallow Lee on Leith Walk for the crime.

Patrick Simson, the Greek language expert, whose father was minister in Dunbar, preached here.

== See also ==
list of places in East Lothian
