= Patrick Galloway =

Scottish minister

Patrick Galloway (c. 1551 – 1626) was a Scottish minister, a Moderator of the General Assembly of the Church of Scotland. He was Moderator of the General Assembly in 1590, and again in 1602. Having been completely gained over by the Court party he used all his influence in forwarding the views of the King for the introduction of Episcopacy.

== Life ==
He was born in Dundee about 1551, the son of George Galloway, a baker, and burgess in the town, and his wife Christian Nicoll. In 1576 he was appointed minister of the parishes of Fowlis Easter and Longforgan, Perthshire. In 1580 he was called to the Middle Church at Perth, and was admitted in April 1581. In June 1582 James VI came to Perth with his favourite, Esmé Stewart, 1st Duke of Lennox. Lennox had possessed himself of the revenues of the see of Glasgow, having prevailed on Robert Montgomerie, minister of Stirling, to become a tulchan bishop, with a pension. Galloway preached about this transaction, and the privy council sustained his right to do so, but Lennox obtained an order forbidding Galloway to preach so long as the king stayed in Perth. He went to Kinnoull and preached there, and again preached before the king at Stirling, after the Ruthven raid, on 22 August 1582.

Galloway was suspected of being privy to the plot of the raid, which managed the eventual banishment of Lennox. The king's other favourite, James Stewart, Earl of Arran, kept his eye on Galloway, in April 1584, and got an order for his apprehension. Galloway kept out of the way and hid for some time in the neighbourhood of Dundee. Hearing that his house in Perth had been searched, he fled to England in May. He preached in London, and afterwards in Newcastle upon Tyne. In November 1585 he was permitted to return to his charge in Perth. The General Assembly.appointed him in 1586 visitor for Perthshire, and in 1588 visitor for Dunkeld and Perth.

James VI gave £295 Scots to Galloway in two payments, first in November 1588 and then on 7 May 1589 on his return from the Brig O'Dee. Galloway sailed to Denmark on 3 March 1590 with a commission from the Kirk to the King, to hasten his return to Scotland. He gave the sermon at Anne of Denmark's coronation on 17 May.

Galloway, though no courtier, was moderate in church matters, and on this account found favour with the king, who employed him in editing some religious writings from his royal pen, sent for him to Edinburgh in 1590, and made him on 18 March minister in the royal household. On 4 August 1590, he was elected Moderator of the General Assembly. He openly rebuked the king on 3 December 1592 for bringing in James Stewart, Earl of Arran to his counsels.

Galloway and David Cunningham, Bishop of Aberdeen, gave sermons at the masque at the baptism of Prince Henry in August 1594. In August 1595 Galloway preached to James VI and Anne of Denmark at Falkland Palace, in his sermon speaking the creation of Eve from Adam's side and of the duties of man and wife to each other, and the queen was said to have paid attention to his advice. On 19 August 1596, at Gowrie House in Perth, he questioned Christian Stewart in Nokwalter, who was accused of causing the death of Patrick Ruthven by witchcraft.

He refused to subscribe the 'band,' or engagement, by which James sought on 20 December 1596 to bind ministers not to preach against the royal authority, objecting that the existing pledges of loyalty were sufficient. After the Gowrie Conspiracy in August 1600, he twice preached before the king, at the cross of Edinburgh on 11 August, and at Glasgow on 31 August, maintaining the reality of the danger which the king had escaped. On 10 November 1602, Galloway was again chosen Moderator of the General Assembly.

In January 1604 he attended on James at Hampton Court, acting for the Edinburgh presbytery to the king, in reference to the Hampton Court Conference held in that month between the Church of England hierarchy and the representatives of the Millenary Petition. Galloway was present during the actual conference. Of the proceedings on 12 January, when the king and Privy Council met the bishops and deans in private, he gives a brief hearsay account. His statement speaks of the "great fervency" with which James urged instances of 'corruptions' in the Anglican church. Galloway represents the bishops as arguing that to make any alterations in the prayer-book would be tantamount to admitting that popish recusants and deprived puritans had suffered for refusing submission to what "now was confessed to be erroneous".

Galloway was popular as a preacher, and his services were sought in 1606 as one of the ministers of St Giles' Cathedral, Edinburgh; first on 3 June by the town council, then on 12 September by the four congregations which met there. He was not, however, appointed till the end of June 1607. In 1610, and again in 1615 and 1619, he was a member of the high commission court. On 27 June 1617, he signed the Protestation for the Liberties of the Kirk, directed against the legislative measures by which James sought to override the authority of the General Assembly. The most obnoxious of these measures having been withdrawn, Galloway withdrew his protest. He gave support to the Five Articles of Perth in August 1618 and did his best to carry out at St. Giles' in 1620 the article which enjoined kneeling at the communion. Of his last years little is known, and the exact date of his death is uncertain. It occurred before 10 February 1626, and probably in January of that year, though it has been placed as early as 1624.

He died after a short illness early in February 1626.

== Family ==
He married:

(1) 1 May 1583, Matilda Guthrie, who died June 1592, and had issue —

- James Galloway of Carnbee, created Baron Dunkeld 15 May 1645
- William
- Dorothy (married William Adamson of Craigcrook)
- Christian

(2) in 1600, Katherine, daughter of James Lawson (Knox's colleague), widow of Gilbert Dick, merchant, burgess of Edinburgh.

== Works ==
- Catechisme (London, 1588)
- A Short Discourse of the Good Ends of the Higher Providence, in the Late Attempt at His Majesty's Person (Edinburgh, 1600)
- Letters to the Presb. of Edinburgh and to James VI. (Orig. Lett.)
- The Apology when he Fled to England
- Discourses on the Gowrie Conspiracy (Bannatyne Miscell., i.; Pitcairn's Cr. Trials, ii.)

== Bibliography ==
- Edin. Guild, Counc, and Test. Reg.
- Douglas's Peerage
- Pollock's Works
- Melvill's Autob.
- Bann. Miscell., i.
- Row's and Calderwood's hists.
- Wilson's Pr. Perth
