= Andrew Melville =

Scottish scholar, theologian, poet and religious reformer (1545 – 1622)

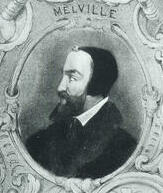
- Image of Melville "From an old engraving in St. Andrews University"
- Born: 1 August 1545; Baldovie, Scotland
- Died: 1622 (aged 76–77); Sedan, France
- Education: University of St Andrews; University of Paris; University of Poitiers
- Occupations: Scholar; theologian; poet; religious reformer
- Theological work
- Tradition or movement: Presbyterianism

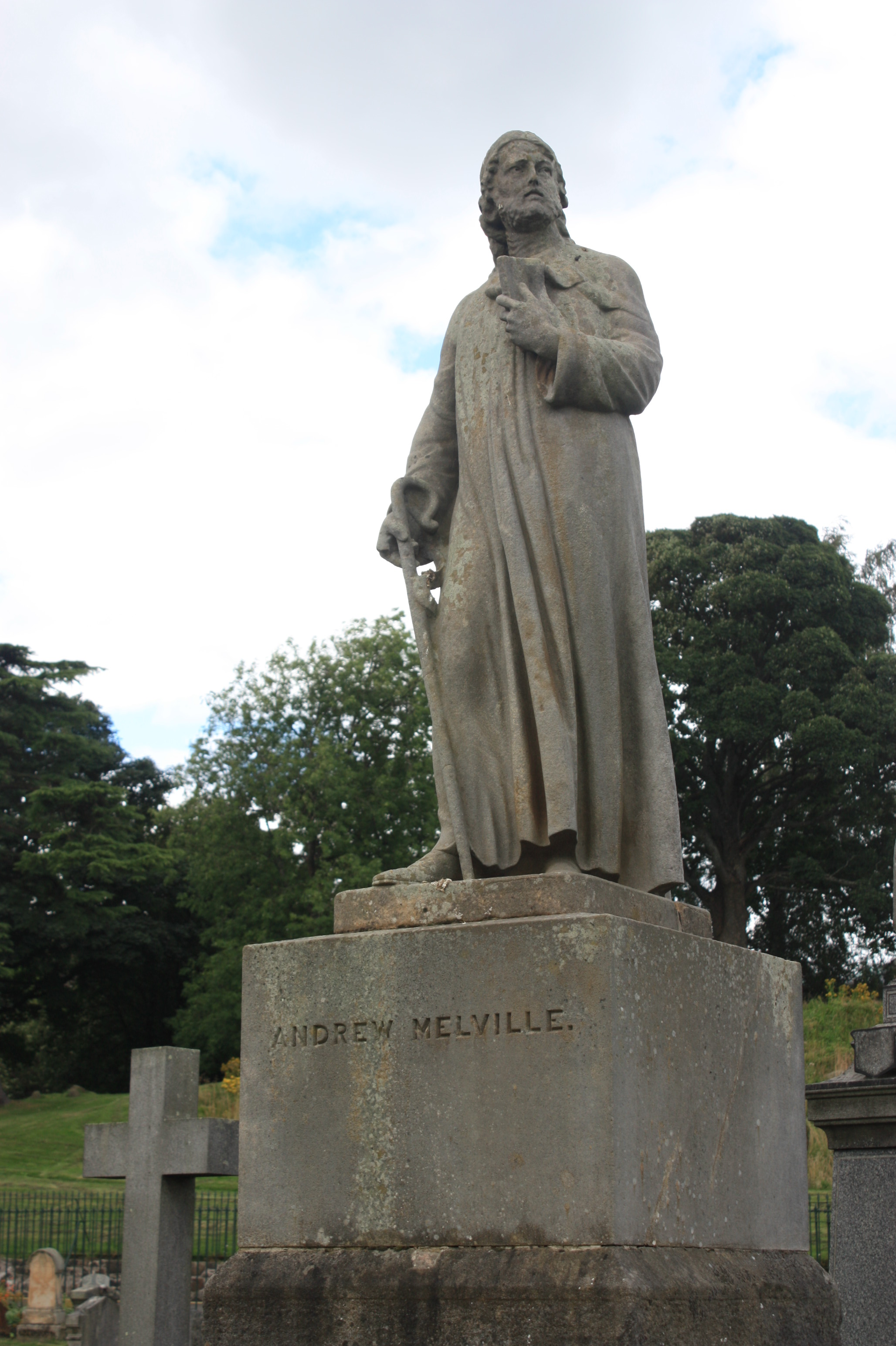
Statue of Andrew Melville in Valley Cemetery, Stirling by Alexander Handyside Ritchie After spending a couple of days at Stirling, where he was introduced to the youthful James VI, and had some consultation with Buchanan, Melville settled in Glasgow early in November 1574.

Andrew Melville (1 August 1545 – 1622) was a Scottish scholar, theologian, poet and religious reformer. His fame encouraged scholars from the European continent to study at Glasgow and St. Andrews.

He was born at Baldovie, on 1 August 1545, the youngest son of Richard Melville of Baldovie, and Geills, daughter of Thomas Abercrombie of Montrose. He was educated at the Grammar School, Montrose, and the University of St Andrews. He later went to France in 1564, and studied law at Poitiers. He became regent in the College of Marceon, and took part in the defence of Poitiers against the Huguenots. He then proceeded to Geneva, where he was appointed Professor of Humanity. He returned to Scotland in 1574 and was appointed Principal of the University of Glasgow in autumn of that year. He did much to establish the university on a proper footing and founded four chairs in Languages, Science and Philosophy. He was admitted as minister of Govan in conjunction 13 July 1577. Melville was elected Moderator of the General Assembly of the Church of Scotland on 24 April 1578. He opposed the Episcopal tendency in the Church, and did much to establish the Presbyterian form of government. He further did much to remodel the Scottish Universities, especially St Andrews; St Mary's thereafter being devoted to Divinity, Melville being appointed Principal thereof in November 1580. He was again elected Moderator of the General Assembly 24 April and 27 June 1582, and 20 June 1587. In the Assembly of October 1581, he took an active part in the libel against Robert Montgomery, Bishop of Glasgow, for simoniacal practices.

Melville was appointed on a commission to wait upon James VI in 1582, with a remonstrance and petition which, notwithstanding the entreaties of his friends, he presented. On 15 February 1584 he was summoned before the Privy Council for alleged treason in a sermon preached at St Andrews the June previous, and ordered to be imprisoned at Blackness, but his friends assisted him to escape to England. On Arran's fall he returned to Scotland and was restored by Parliament at Linlithgow in December 1585. In 1590 he became rector of the University of St Andrews, which office he held until 1597, and at the coronation of the Queen, 17 May 1590, he recited a Latin poem, the Stephaniskion. He was again appointed Moderator of the General Assembly, 7 May 1594, but on a visitation of the university by the King in June 1597, he was deprived of his rectorship. He attended the General Assembly at Dundee, March 1598, but was ordered to withdraw by the King.

In 1599 he was appointed Dean of the Faculty of Theology. He caused the Synod of Fife in 1599 to censure certain propositions in the Basilikon Doron by the King. At the Assembly at Montrose in March 1600 he unsuccessfully claimed his right to sit, but was successful in that at Burntisland May 1601. He took part in that held at Aberdeen in 1605 and offered, with others, a protest to Parliament at Perth in 1606 in favour of the right of free Assembly. For this he was summoned with others to London, where he was cited before the English Privy Council for writing a bitter Latin epigram against the accessories of Anglican worship and placed under the custody of John Overal, D.D., Dean of St Paul's, and afterwards of Bilson, Bishop of Winchester. Again brought before the Privy Council, he broke into a violent tirade against that Court and was committed to solitary confinement in the Tower. Henri de la Tour, Duke de Bouillon, having obtained his release, appointed him to the Chair of Biblical Theology in the University of Sedan, and Melville embarked for France 19 April 1611. He died unmarried after a series of illnesses at Sedan in 1622.

== Early life and early education ==
He was born on 1 August 1545 at Baldovie near Montrose, Angus, the youngest son of Richard Melville (brother to Melville of Dysart).

Andrew was the youngest of nine sons of Richard Melville of Baldovy, near Montrose, where he was born 1 August 1545. He is described as the ninth son, yet speaks in a letter of 1612 as having outlived his ‘fourteen brethren.’ His father lost his life in the battle of Pinkie, when Andrew was only two years old and, his mother dying soon after, he was brought up under the care of his eldest brother Richard (1522–1575), afterwards minister of Maryton, who, at a proper age, sent him to the grammar school of Montrose.

At an early age Melville began to show a taste for learning, and his brother did everything in his power to give him the best education. He learned the rudiments of Latin at the grammar school of Montrose, after leaving which he learned Greek for two years under Pierre de Marsilliers, a Frenchman whom John Erskine of Dun had persuaded to settle at Montrose; such was Melville's proficiency that on going to the University of St Andrews he astonished the professors by using the Greek text of Aristotle, which no one else there understood. On completing his course, Melville left St Andrews with the reputation of "the best poet, philosopher, and Grecian of any young master in the land."

== Travels and study in Europe ==
In 1564, at nineteen years of age, he set out for France to complete his education at the University of Paris. Having graduated at St. Andrews, he repaired to France in the autumn of 1564, reaching Paris from Dieppe after a roundabout and stormy voyage. He now attained great fluency in Greek, made acquirements in oriental languages, studied mathematics and law, and came under the direct influence of Peter Ramus, whose new methods of teaching he subsequently transplanted to Scotland.

He also attended the last course of lectures delivered by Adrianus Turnebus, professor of Greek, as well as those of Petrus Ramus, whose philosophical method and plan of teaching Melville later introduced into the universities of Scotland. It was also in Paris where Melville studied Hebrew under Jean Mercier, one of the leading hebraists of that time. From Paris he went to Poitiers (1566) to study civil law, and though only twenty-one was apparently at once made a regent in the college of St Marceon. After three years, however, political troubles compelled him to leave France, and he went to Geneva, where he was welcomed by Theodore Beza, at whose instigation he was appointed to the chair of humanity in the academy of Geneva.

== Scottish academic ==
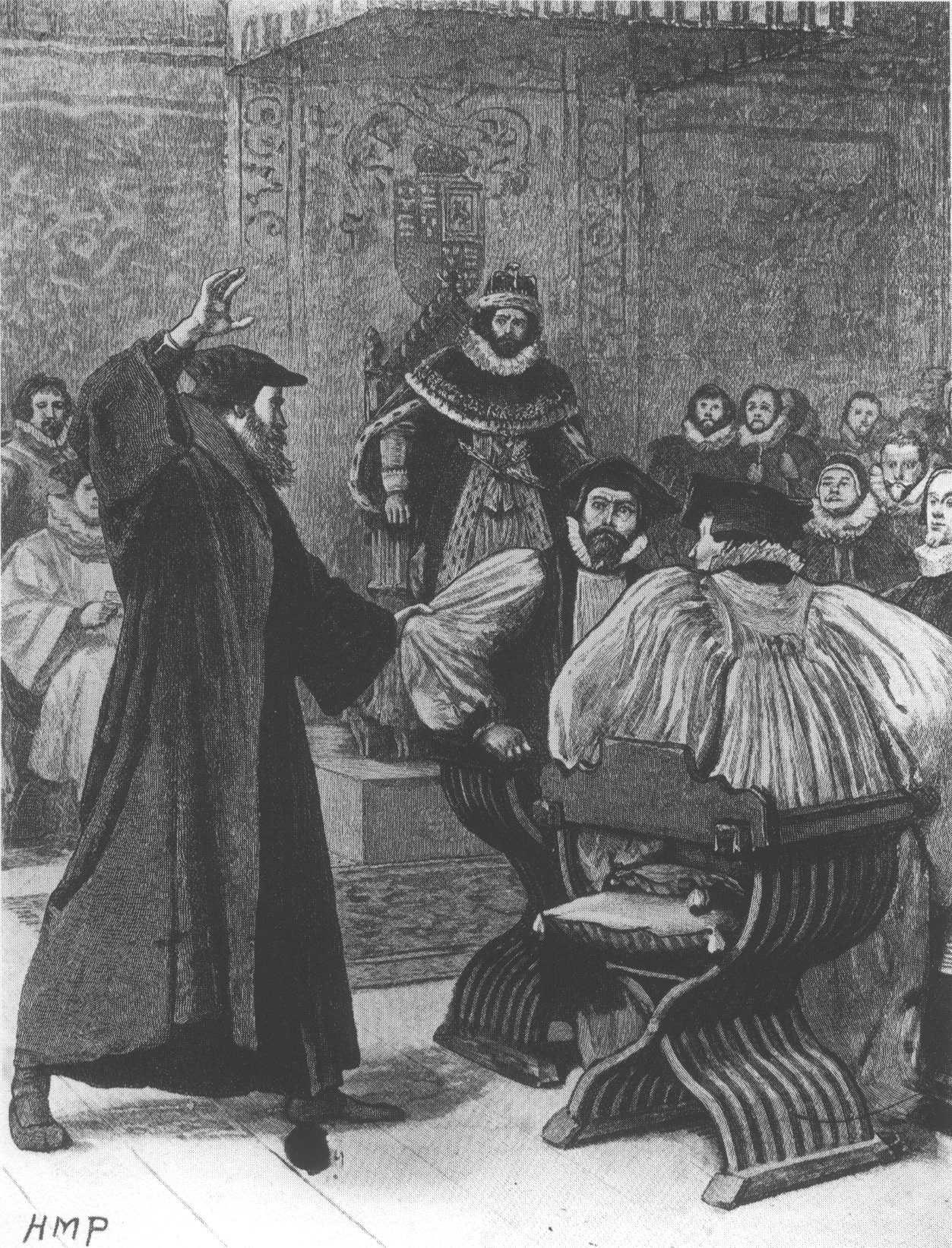
A fanciful Victorian depiction of Melville upbraiding bishops in the presence of James VI

In addition to teaching, Melville continued to study Oriental literature, and in particular acquired from Cornelius Bertram, one of his brother professors, a knowledge of Syriac. At Geneva as early as 1572 he met Joseph Scaliger and Francis Hottoman, who in 1572, after the massacre on St. Bartholomew's day, took up their abode in that city. While he lived at Geneva the massacre of St Bartholomew in 1572 drove immense numbers of Protestant refugees to that city, including several of the most distinguished French men of letters of the time. Among these were several men learned in civil law, and political science, and associating with them increased Melville's knowledge and enlarged his ideas of civil and ecclesiastical liberty.

In 1574 Melville returned to Scotland, and almost immediately received the appointment of Principal of the University of Glasgow, and began its renewal. Besides his duties in the university, he officiated as minister of the church of Govan, in the vicinity.

Melville set himself to establish a good educational system. He enlarged the curriculum, and established chairs in languages, science, philosophy and divinity, which were confirmed by charter in 1577. His fame spread, and students flocked from all parts of Scotland and beyond. He assisted in the reconstruction of King's College of the University of Aberdeen in 1575, and to do for St Andrews what he had done for Glasgow, he was appointed Principal of St Mary's College, St Andrews, in 1580. His duties there comprised the teaching of theology, Hebrew, Chaldee, Syriac and Rabbinical languages.

As a member of the General Assembly, he took a prominent part in all the measures of that body against episcopacy; and as he was unflinching in his opposition to that form of church government, he received the name of Episcopomastix, or The Scourge of Bishops. A remarkable instance of his intrepidity occurred at an interview, which took place in October 1577, between him and the Regent Morton, when the latter, irritated at the proceedings of the Assembly, exclaimed, "There will never be quietness in this country till half a dozen of you be hanged or banished!" "Hark! Sir", said Melville, "threaten your courtiers after that manner! It is the same to me whether I rot in the air, or in the ground. The earth is the Lord's. Patria est ubicunque est bene. I have been ready to give up my life where it would not have been half so well wared, at the pleasure of my God. I have lived out of your country ten years, as well as in it. Let God be glorified, it will not be in your power to hang or exile his truth." This bold language Morton did not venture to resent.

Melville created a fashion for the study of Greek literature. The reforms, however, which his new modes of teaching involved, and even some of his new doctrines, such as the non-infallibility of Aristotle, brought him into conflict with other teachers in the university.

== Moderator of the Church's General Assembly ==
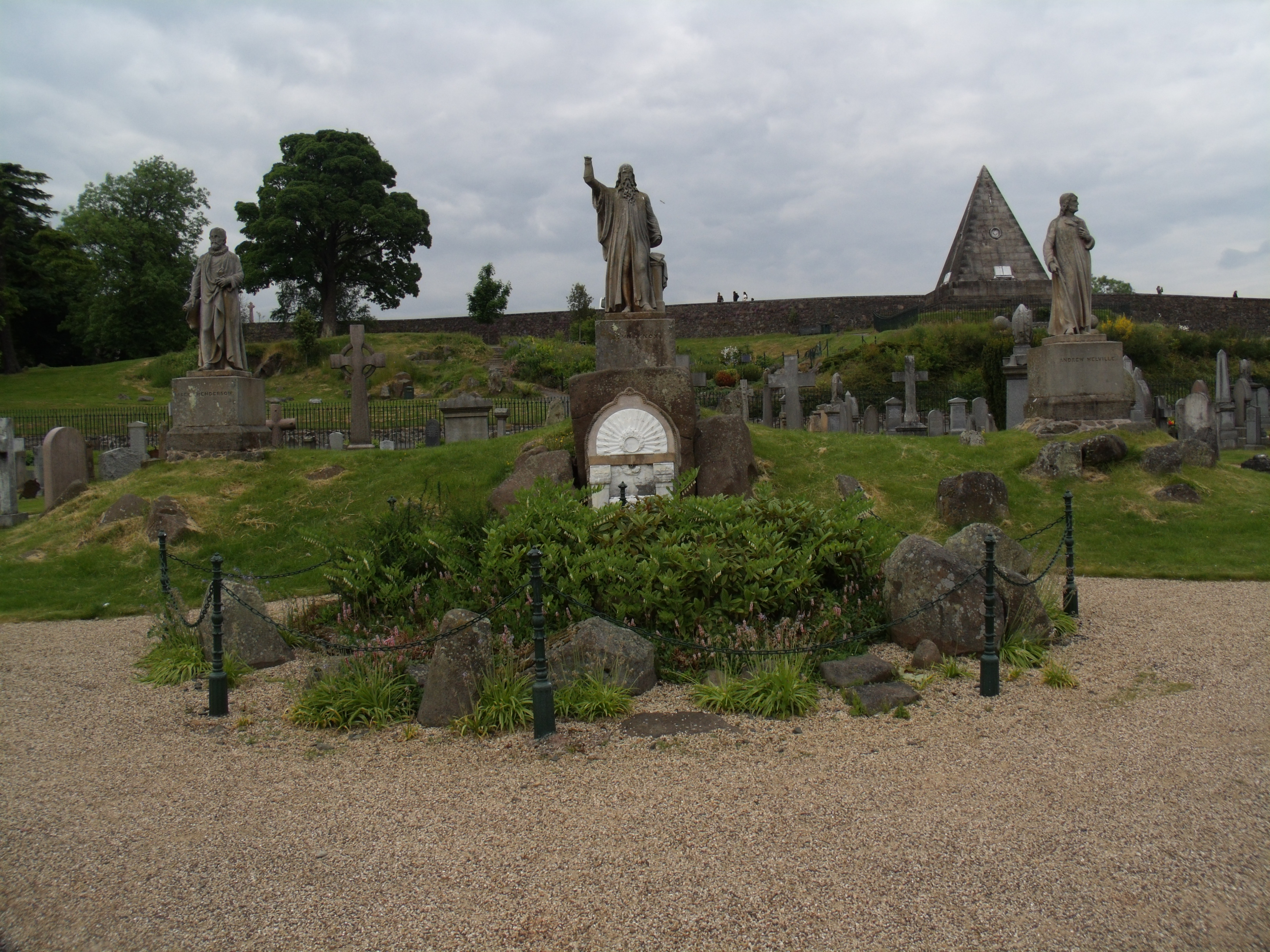
Left to right: Henderson, Knox, Melville. Valley Cemetery, Stirling

Disruption brooch showing the graves of Andrew Melville, John Knox, David Welsh, James Renwick, and Alexander Henderson

Melville was moderator of the General Assembly which met at Edinburgh 24 April 1578, in which the second Book of Discipline was approved of. The attention of the Assembly was about this time directed to the reformation and improvement of the universities, and Melville was, in December 1580, removed from Glasgow, and installed principal of St. Mary's college, St. Andrews. Here, besides giving lectures in divinity, he taught the Hebrew, Chaldee, Syriac, and Rabbinical languages, and his prelections were attended, not only by young students in unusual numbers, but also by some of the masters of the other colleges.

He was moderator of the Assembly which met at St. Andrews on 24 April 1582, and also of an extraordinary meeting of the Assembly, convened at Edinburgh on 27 June thereafter, in consequence of the arbitrary measures of the court, in relation particularly to the case of Robert Montgomery, the excommunicated Archbishop of Glasgow. He opened the proceedings with a sermon, in which he boldly inveighed against the absolute authority claimed by the government in ecclesiastical matters. A spirited remonstrance being agreed to by the Assembly, Melville and others were appointed to present it to the king, then with the court at Perth. When the remonstrance was read before his majesty in council, the king's unworthy favourite, the earl of Arran, menacingly exclaimed, "Who dare subscribe these treasonable articles?" "We dare", said the undaunted Melville, and taking a pen, immediately signed his name. His example was followed by the other commissioners, and so much were Lennox and Arran over-awed by their intrepidity, that they dismissed them peaceably.

For about three years Melville had preached, assisted by his nephew, in the parish church of St. Andrews. In February 1584 he was cited before the privy council, to answer a charge of treason, founded on some seditious expressions, which it was alleged he had made use of in a sermon on the 4th chapter of Daniel, on the occasion of a fast kept during the preceding month; particularly that he had compared the king's mother to Nebuchadnezzar, who was banished from the kingdom, and would be restored again. At his appearance, he denied using these words, entered into a full defence of those he had actually used, and presented a protest and declinature, claiming to be tried by the ecclesiastical court. When brought before the king and council, he boldly told them that they had exceeded their jurisdiction in judging of the doctrine, or calling to account any of the ambassadors or messengers of a king and council greater than they, and far above them. Then loosing a little Hebrew bible from his belt, and throwing it on the table before them, he said, "That you may see your weakness, oversight, and rashness, in taking upon you that which neither you ought nor can do, there are my instructions and warrant. Let me see which of you can judge of them or control me therein, that I have passed by my injunctions." Arran, finding the book in Hebrew, put it into the king's hands, saying, " Sir, he scorns your majesty and council." "No, my lord", replied Melville, " I scorn not, but with all earnestness, zeal, and gravity, I stand for the cause of Jesus Christ and his church." Not being able to prove the charge against him, and unwilling to let him go, the council declared him guilty of declining their jurisdiction, and of behaving irreverently before them, and sentenced him to be imprisoned in the castle of Edinburgh, and to be further punished in his person and goods at the pleasure of the king. Before, however, being charged to enter himself in ward, his place of confinement was ordered to be changed to Blackness Castle, which was kept by a dependant of Arran. While at dinner the king's macer was admitted and gave him the charge to enter within 24 hours: but he avoided being sent there by secretly withdrawing from Edinburgh. After staying some time at Berwick, he proceeded to London, and in the ensuing July visited the universities of Oxford and Cambridge, at both of which he was received in a manner becoming his learning and reputation.

== From England to St Andrews ==
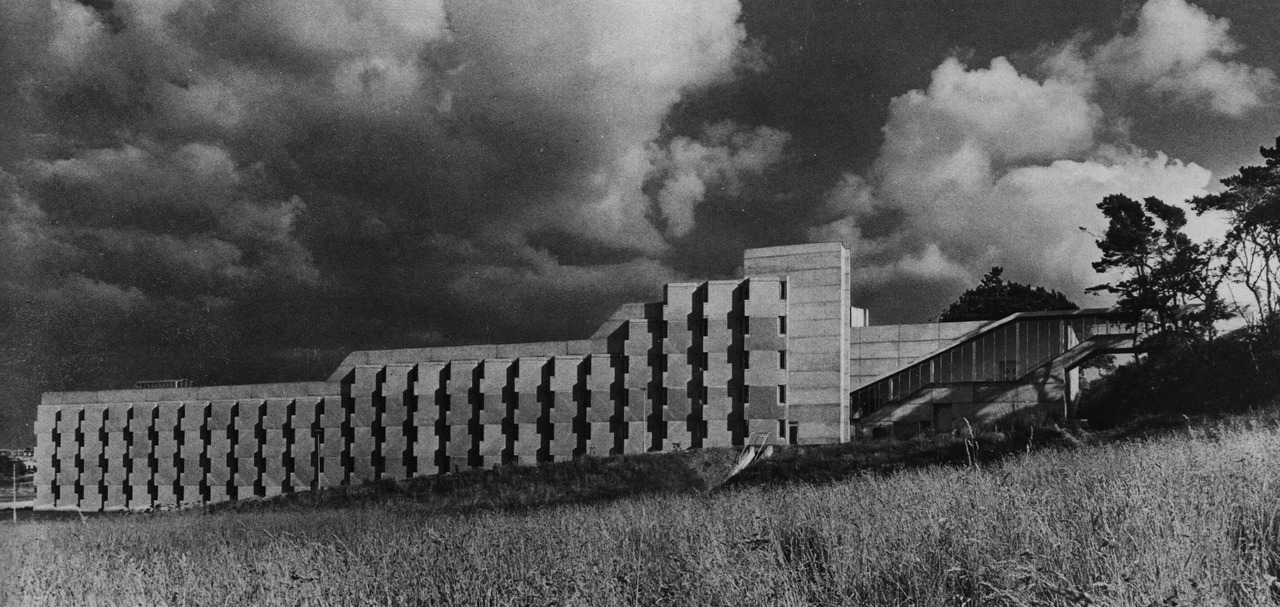
Andrew Melville Hall at the University of St Andrews

He returned to Scotland in November 1585 after an absence of twenty months, and in March 1586 resumed his lectures in St Andrews, where he continued for twenty years; he became rector of the university in 1590.

On the disgrace of the earl of Arran, Melville returned to Scotland with the banished lords, in November 1585. Having assisted in re-organising the college of Glasgow, he resumed, in the following March, his duties at St. Andrews. The synod of Fife, which met in April, proceeded to excommunicate Patrick Adamson, Archbishop of St. Andrews, for his attempts to overturn the presbyterian form of government in the church; and, in return, that prelate issued a sentence of excommunication against Melville, and his nephew, James Melville, with others of their brethren. In consequence of this difference with the archbishop, Melville received a written mandate from the king to confine his residence to the north of the Tay, and he was not restored to his office in the university till the following August. Some time after, when Adamson had been deprived of his archbishopric, and was reduced to great poverty, finding himself deserted by the king, he addressed a letter to his former antagonist, Melville, expressing regret for his past conduct, and soliciting his assistance. Melville hastened to visit him, and not only procured contributions for his relief among his friends, but continued for several months to support him from his own resources.

In June 1587, Melville was again elected moderator of the Assembly, and nominated one of the commissioners for attending to the proceedings in parliament. He was present at the coronation of the queen, 17 May 1590, and recited a Latin poem composed for the occasion, which was immediately published at the desire of the king. In the same year he was elected rector of the university of St. Andrews, an office which, for a series of years, he continued to hold by re-election. In May 1594 he was again elected moderator of the Assembly. Shortly after, he appeared on behalf of the church before the lords of the articles, and urged the forfeiture of the popish lords, and along with his nephew and two other ministers, he accompanied the king, at his express request, on his expedition against them. In October 1594 he was with the king at Huntly Castle and argued for its demolition.

In the following year, when it was proposed to recall the popish nobles from exile, he went with some other ministers to the convention of estates at St. Andrews, to remonstrate against the design, but was ordered by the king to withdraw, which he did, after a most resolute reply. The commission of the Assembly having met at Cupar in Fife, they sent Melville and some other members to expostulate with the king. Being admitted to a private audience, James Melville began to address his majesty with great mildness and respect; but the king becoming impatient, charged them with sedition, on which Andrew took him by the sleeve, and calling him "God's silly vassal", said,

This is not a time to flatter, but to speak plainly, for our commission is from the living God, to whom the king is subject. We will always humbly reverence your majesty in public, but having opportunity of being with your majesty in private, we must discharge our duty, or else be enemies to Christ: And now, Sire, I must tell you that there are two kingdoms—the kingdom of Christ, which is the church, whose subject King James VI. is, and of whose kingdom he is not a head, nor a lord, but a member; and they whom Christ hath called, and commanded to watch over his church, and govern his spiritual kingdom, have sufficient power and authority from him so to do, which no Christian king nor prince should control or discharge, but assist and support, otherwise they are not faithful subjects to Christ.

The king listened patiently to this bold admonition, and dismissed them with many fair promises which he never intended to fulfil. For several years following King James made repeated attempts to control the church, according to his own arbitrary notions, but he invariably encountered a strenuous opponent in Andrew Melville; and he had recourse at last to one of those stratagems which he thought the very essence of "king-craft", to secure the removal of this champion of presbyterianism from Scotland altogether.

During the whole time he protected the liberties of the Scottish Church against all encroachments of the government. That in the main he was fighting for the constitutionally guaranteed rights of the Church is generally accepted. The chief charge against Melville is that his fervour often led him to forget the reverence due to an "anointed monarch". When the king acted in an arbitrary and illegal manner he needed the reminder that though he was king over men he was only "God's silly vassal." Melville's rudeness (if it is to be called so) was the outburst of just indignation from a man zealous for the purity of religion and regardless of consequences to himself.

His nephew James Melville, who was present, records the famous statement he made in Falkland in private to King James VI of Scotland, later to become King James I of England. Calling him "God's sillie vassal" and taking him by the sleeve, he said,

Sir, we will humblie reverence your Majestie always, namlie in public, but sen we have this occasioun to be with your Majestie in privat, and the treuthe is, yie ar brought in extream danger bathe of your lyff and croun, and with yow, the country and Kirk of Christ is lyk to wrak, for nocht telling yow the treuthe, and giffen of yow fathfull counsall, we mon [must] discharge our dewtie thairin, or els be trators bathe to Christ and yow! And thairfor Sir, as divers tymes befor, sa now again, I mon tell yow, thair is twa Kings and twa Kingdomes in Scotland. Thair is Chryst Jesus the King, and his Kingdome the Kirk, whase subject King James the Saxt is, and of whose kingdome nocht a king, nor a lord, nor a heid, bot a member! And they whome Chryst hes callit and commandit to watch over his Kirk, and govern his spirituall kingdome, hes sufficient powar of him, and authoritie sa to do, bathe togidder and severalie; the quhilk na Christian King or Prince sould control and discharge, but fortifie and assist, utherwayes nocht fathfull subjects nor members of Chryst.

== King James and imprisonment ==
In 1599 he was deprived of the rectorship, but was made dean of the faculty of theology. The close of Melville's career in Scotland was at length brought about by James in characteristic fashion. In May 1606, Melville, with his nephew, and six of their brethren, were called to London by a letter from the king, on the specious pretext that his majesty wished to consult them as to the affairs of the church. Soon after their arrival they attended the famous conference held on 23 September, in presence of the king at Hampton Court, at which Melville spoke at great length, and with a boldness which astonished the English nobility and clergy. On St. Michael's day, Melville and his brethren were commanded to attend the royal chapel, when, scandalized at the popish character of the service, on his return to his lodging he vented his indignation in a Latin epigram, for which, a copy having been conveyed to the king, he was brought before the council at Whitehall. Being by them found guilty of "scandalum magnatum," he was committed first to the custody of the dean of St. Paul's, and afterwards to the charge of the bishop of Winchester; but was ultimately sent to the Tower, where he remained a prisoner for four years.

- The following is the epigram:

Cur stant clausi Anglis libri duo regia in ara,
Lumina casca duo, pollubra sicca duo?
Num sensum cultumque Dei tenet Anglia clausum,
Lumine exca suo, sorde sepulta sua?
Romano an ritu, dum regalem instruit aram,
Purpuream pingit religiosa lupam ?

- Thus rendered in an old translation:

Why stand there on the altar high
Two closed books, blind lights, two basins dry?
Doth England hold God's mind and worship close.
Blind of her sight, and buried in her dross?
Doth she, with chapel put in Romish dress,
The purple whore religiously express?

- And for this Melville was sent to the tower.

At first he was treated with the utmost rigour, and denied even the use of pen, ink, and paper; but his spirit remained unsubdued, and he beguiled his solitary hours by composing Latin verses, which, with the tongue of his shoe buckle, he engraved on his prison walls. By the interference of some friends at court, his confinement was, after the lapse of nearly ten months, rendered less severe. About the end of 1607 the Protestants of Rochelle endeavoured to obtain his services as professor of divinity in their college, but the king would not consent to his liberation.

== Freed to France ==
At length, in February 1611, at the intercession of the duke of Bouillon, he was released from confinement, on condition of his becoming professor of theology in the Protestant university of Sedan, in France, where he spent the remainder of his life, and died there in 1622, at the advanced age of 77. On being freed, but refused permission to return to his own country, he was invited to fill a professor's chair in the Academy of Sedan, and there he spent the last eleven years of his life.

== Personal life ==
His biographer, Dr. M'Crie, says that Andrew Melville "was the first Scotsman who added a taste for elegant literature to an extensive acquaintance with theology." Although he sustained a conspicuous part in all the important public transactions of his time, he neither was nor affected to be the leader of a party. In private he was an agreeable companion, remarkable for his cheerfulness and kindliness of disposition. He was never married. Beyond the statement that he was of low stature there is no description of his personal appearance extant, nor is there any known portrait of him.

The greater part of his writings consists of Latin poems. Dr. M'Crie, whose Life of Andrew Melville was published in 1824, in 2 volumes, has given the names of all his works, printed and left in manuscript, and there is none of any great extent among them.

== Works ==
For a modern list see Holloway.
Works listed by Hew Scott include:

- Carmen Mosis (Basel, 1573), reprinted in Delitice Poetarum Scotorum (Amsterdam, 1637);
- Julii Ccesaris Scaligeri Posmata (Geneva, 1575);
- "Zre^aviaKiov, Ad Scotice Regem, habitum" in Coronatione Regince, etc. (Edinburgh, 1590);
- Carmina Sacra duo, etc. (Geneva, 1590);
- Principis Scoti-Britannorum Natalia, etc. (Edinburgh: Robert Waldegrave, 1594; Hague, 1594);
- Theses Theological de Libero Arbitrio (Edinburgh, 1597);
- Scholastica Diatriba de Rebus Divinis (Edinburgh, 1599);
- Inscriptiones Historical Regum Scotorum . . . Joh. Jonston . . . Author e . . . Prcefixus est Gathelus, sive de Gentis Origine Fragmentum, Andreas Melvini (Amsterdam, 1602);

several poems

- In Obitum Johannis Wallasii (Leyden, 1603);
- Pro supplici Evangelicorum Ministrorum in Anglia . . . Apologia, sive Anti- Tami – Garni – Categoria (?1604; reprinted in Parasynagma Perthense by Calderwood, Edinburgh, 1620, and in Altare Damascenum, 1623);
- Four Letters in Lusus Poetici by David Hume (Edinburgh, 1605);
- Sidera Veteris JEvi, by John Johnston [contains two poems by Melvill] (Saumur, 1611);
- Comment, in Apost. Acta M. Johannis Malcolmi [verses by M. prefixed] (Middelburg, 1615);
- Duellum Poeticum contendentibus G. Eglisemmio et G. Buchanano (London, 1618; prints, M.'s Cavillum in Aram Regiam, the Epigram on the Chapel Royal);
- three Epigrams in Sir James Sempill's Sacriledge Sacredly Handled (London, 1619);
- Viri clarissimi A. Melvini Musas [the appended Life of Adamson, etc., not by Melvill] (Edinburgh, 1620);
- De Adiaphoris, Scotitov tvxovtos, Aphorismi (1622);
- Epitaph on James Melvill in his Ad Serenissimum Jacobum Primum . . . Libellus Supplex (London, 1645);
- Andrew Melvini Scotia;
- Topographia in Blaeu's Atlas Major (Amsterdam, 1662);
- Five poems in Kollman's De Diebus Festis (Utrecht, 1693);
- Commentarius in Divinam Pauli Epistolam ad Romanos (Wodrow Society, Edinburgh, 1850)

== Bibliography ==
For a modern bibliography see Holloway.
Alexander Gordon's Bibliography (the Unitarian minister wrote an article in the Dictionary of National Biography):

- McCrie's Life, 1819 (the edition used in 1856, edited by his son), is a work of close and wide research, and may be safely followed for the facts.
- James Melvill's Diary (Bannatyne Club), 1829
- Hist. of the Declining Age (Wodrow Soc.), 1842;
- William Scot's Apologetical Narration (Wodrow Soc.) 1846;
- Calderwood's Hist. of the Kirk (Wodrow Soc.), 1842–9.
- Spotiswood's Hist. of the Church of Scotland (Spottiswoode Soc.), 1847–51;
- Grub's Eccl. Hist. of Scotland, 1861, vol. ii.
- Gardiner's Hist. of England, vol. i.;
- Walton's Lives (Zouch), 1796, p. 295.
- Hew Scott's Fasti Eccles. Scoticanæ adds a few particulars;
- Scots Worthies, 1862, pp. 233 sq.
- Anderson's Scottish Nation, 1872, iii. 140 sq.

Reid's Bibliography
The following is a brief bibliography for the life of Melville:

1. Life. By Dr. Thomas M'Crie. First published in 1819. The edition used in the foregoing pages is that of 1856.
2. Diary of James Melville. Wodrow Society, 1842.
3. Calderwood's History of the Kirk. Wod. Soc. 1842–9.
4. Apologetical Narration by William Scot. Wod. Soc, 1846.
5. Spottiswood's Hist, of the Church of Scotland. Spottiswoode Soc. 1847–51.
6. Grub's Ecclesiastical History of Scotland.
7. Lee's Lectures on the History of the Church of Scotland. 1860.
8. Dictionary of National Biography. Article on Melville by Rev. A. Gordon.
9. Cunningham's Hist, of the Church of Scotland.
10. Andrew Melville. By William Morison. In Famous Scots Series, 1899.
11. Register of St. Andrews Kirk Session. Edited by Dr. Hay Fleming. 1890.
12. Munimenta Almae Universitatis Glasguensis. Maitland Club, 1854.
13. Wodrow's Lives. Maitland Club, 1845.
14. Revue Chretienne, vol. for 1907. Paris.
15. Scott's Fasti, under parish of Govan.
16. Melville's work as Educationist : see Edgar [History of Scott. Education); Strong, J. [Hist, of Sec. Educ. in Scotland); Kerr, J. [Scottish Educ. up to 1908).
17. Andrew Melville. By Dr. John Smith, Glasgow, Oration on Commemoration Day, 1910.
