= Andrew Duncan (minister, died 1626) =

Scottish church leader (c1560–1618)

Personal details
- Born: c1560 unknown
- Died: 1626 Berwick-upon-Tweed
- Denomination: Church of Scotland
- Education: St Leonard's College

Andrew Duncan was a Latin scholar and Church of Scotland minister at Crail. He achieved notoriety for his presbyterian principles which brought him into conflict with James VI who wished to impose an episcopalian system. He attended the General Assembly of Aberdeen in 1605 which had been proscribed or prorogued by royal authority and was one of six ministers who were imprisoned and later exiled as a result. He was allowed to return after several years in France but was subsequently banished again following further controversy in failing to comply with the Five Articles of Perth. He died in exile in Berwick-upon-Tweed in 1626.

== Early life ==
Andrew Duncan's origins and early life are obscure. He was a Regent in St Leonard's College, St Andrews, and Rector of Dundee Grammar School from 1591. During this time he produced several educational works, including Rudimenta Pietatis ("First Principles of Piety"), a catechism which was widely used in Scottish grammar schools until the eighteenth century. He also became a close friend of Andrew Melville. He was presented by James, Lord Lindsay and ordained on 11 September 1596 (coll. 2 March 1597). He attended the Assembly at Aberdeen, on 2 July 1605, which the king had proscribed.

== Background - King James and church government ==
The Church of Scotland was established by Act of Parliament, 24 August 1560, and the first Protestant Assembly was held in the Magdalen Chapel, Edinburgh, on the 20 December 1560. Roman Catholicism was disestablished although a fully presbyterian system did not replace it overnight. The bishops retained their seats in Parliament, and Queen Mary, in 1561, had Mass said in Holyrood, and, but for the opposition of Knox, would have had Catholicism restored. Her son, infant James VI, was baptized in Stirling Castle, on 17 December 1566, by the Archbishop of St. Andrews. But, after the imprisonment of the Queen, the cause of Protestantism was strengthened by Regent Moray. The Church became Presbyterian in its organization but not many years passed away before attacks were made on the government of the Church by the nobles, who were eager for the Church lands that were held by Roman Catholic dignitaries. Regent Morton, after a convention of ministers at Leith in 1574, restored the old titles of bishops and abbots, to such as would have them, with a small portion of the income, while the lion's share of the benefice was to be the property of the aristocracy. These name-only spiritual lords were dubbed Tulchan bishops. Presbytery was now becoming established, and continued its conflict with state-craft and king-craft for more than a century. The boy-king James, was the enemy of Presbyterianism, but he was matched by Andrew Melville. He was helped to grow the universities and was one of the compilers of The Second Book of Discipline, as Knox was of The First. The General Assembly in 1580 had declared Episcopacy unlawful, and without warrant in the word of God. Then came the adoption of the National Covenant in 1581, the Raid of Ruthven in 1582, the passing of the legislation which is known by the nickname of The Black Acts, in 1584, which declared the king to be supreme in all causes and over all persons, and ordered all ministers to acknowledge the bishops as their ecclesiastical superiors. Then, in 1587, the Act of Annexation attached the temporalities of all benefices to the Crown. Thus far the drift of the tide was towards absolutism, till an ebb in 1590 found the king in the Assembly praising God for the Presbyterian character of the Scottish Kirk; and in 1592, the Magna Charta of Presbyterianism revoked the Black Acts and re-established Presbytery. The bishops were cast out. But the happiness of the Presbyterians was short-lived. A question regarding the toleration to be extended to certain Roman Catholics put the king and the clergy in antagonism, and the king reverted to his old hatred of Presbyterianism and his schemes for introducing Episcopacy. He got the Assembly to meet at Perth, and afterwards at Dundee, and the Commission then appointed were declared by Parliament in 1597 to be the Third Estate, and it was provided that they should enter Parliament as bishops, abbots, or priors. A second Assembly met at Dundee in 1598, which approved of the king's proposal, and in 1600, bishops again sat in Parliament. When James became king of England in 1603, as the successor to Queen Elizabeth, his love of absolutism and dislike to Presbyterianism became more pronounced. His maxim, " No bishop, no king," seemed to govern his conduct towards the Scottish Church. Hence he dissolved Assemblies, or prevented their meeting, as it suited his pleasure. In 1605, certain ministers held an Assembly at Aberdeen, for which fourteen of their number were imprisoned, and six of them, after being prosecuted for high treason, were banished. The names of the banished ministers were John Forbes of Alford; John Welch of Ayr, the son-in-law of John Knox; Andrew Duncan; Robert Dury, Anstruther; Alexander Strachan, Creich; and John Sharp, Kilmany. The last-named was afterwards Dr Sharp, Professor of Divinity at Die, in Dauphine, and in 1630 Professor of Theology at the University of Edinburgh. Andrew Melville, after being lured to London, was sent to the Tower, where he remained a prisoner for four years, and was then sent into exile. He found an asylum in France, and was professor of theology at Sedan till his death in 1622. The bishops in 1610 were appointed to be constant moderators in all Church Courts, and three of them, with the view of introducing the apostolic succession into Scotland, repaired to London, and received consecration as the founders of the Scottish hierarchy. In 1617, the king visited Scotland, and was anxious to introduce the Anglican order of service. Next year a docile Assembly at Perth fulfilled the king's pleasure, and passed what are called the Five Articles of Perth.

== The Aberdeen Assembly ==
The bishops being now established, his King James' next object was to procure something like an acknowledgment of them by the Church, to effect which it was necessary to destroy every vestige of freedom in the constitution of her Assemblies. The first attempt of this kind had been made in 1599, when the king dismissed the Assembly, and summoned another to meet at Montrose in 1600, solely by virtue of his royal prerogative. This was entirely contrary to the establishment ratified by parliament in 1592, according to which the time and place of meeting were to be nominated by the preceding Assembly, with his majesty's consent.' Under various pretexts James had infringed this rule, proroguing and altering the time of Assemblies at pleasure; and at last the Assembly which should have met at Aberdeen in July, 1605, was prorogued indefinitely. In the midst of a tempestuous winter, which kept many from coming up, a few men having convened at Aberdeen, determined at least to constitute the Assembly, and appoint another meeting. The king having heard that it was to be held at Aberdeen, sent instructions to Stratton of Laurieston, as commissioner, empowering him to dissolve the meeting, just because it had not been called by his majesty. The brethren present resolved to constitute before reading the communication; and John Forbes, minister of Alford, was chosen moderator. While they were reading the king's letter a messenger-at-arms arrived, and in the king's name commanded them to dissolve, on pain of rebellion. The Assembly agreed to dissolve, provided it were done in the regular way, by his majesty's commissioner naming a day and place for the next meeting. This the commissioner refused to do, the object of the king being to reserve to himself the right of calling it or not at his sovereign pleasure. The moderator accordingly, at the request of his brethren, appointed the Assembly to convene at the same place on the last Tuesday of September, and dissolved the meeting. Such is a short account of the Assembly at Aberdeen, which brought so many ministers into trouble. No sooner, however, was his majesty informed of their proceedings, than he transmitted orders to his privy-council to proceed against the ministers as guilty of high treason. Fourteen of them, having defended their conduct, were committed to various prisons; and six of the principal ministers, who were obnoxious for their fidelity, were selected for prosecution. Their names were: John Forbes of Alford; John Welch of Ayr, (the son-in-law of John Knox); Andrew Duncan; Robert Dury, Anstruther; Alexander Strachan, Creich; and John Sharp, Kilmany.

== The Linlithgow trial ==
At three o'clock in the morning, in the depth of winter, and through roads almost impassable, these men were summoned to stand trial for high treason before the court of justiciary at Linlithgow, where they were met by a number of their brethren, who had come to countenance them during their trial. The prisoners made an eloquent defence. The concluding speech of Forbes, the moderator, has been recorded. The Earl of Dunbar had been sent down for the express purpose of securing the condemnation of the ministers; the jury were packed, and a verdict was at last obtained at midnight, finding, by a majority of three, the prisoners guilty of high treason. On hearing the verdict the ministers embraced each other, and gave God thanks for having supported them during the trial. It was thought that they might be set at liberty after a little confinement; but orders came down from London in November, 1606, to banish them out of his majesty's dominions. They were accordingly brought from the castle of Blackness to Leith.

== In France ==
Duncan settled at Bordeaux and became a Professor of Theology in the College of Rochelle in May 1607.

== Back in Scotland ==
He returned to Scotland before 1 July 1613, submitted to the King, and obtained permission to remain, resuming his ministry in Crail. He was summoned before the Court of High Commission, on 13 April 1619, for opposing the Perth articles but declined its authority and was suspended on 22 April. On this occasion he boldly admonished his judges of their sin and danger. "Pity yourselves," he said, in his protest, "for the Lord's sake; lose not your own souls, I beseech you, for Esau's pottage; remember Balaam, who was cast away by the deceit of the wages of unrighteousness: forget not how miserable Judas was, who lost himself for a trifle of money, which never did him good. Better be pined to death by hunger than for a little pittance of the earth perish for ever, and never be recovered so long as the days of heaven shall last and the years of eternity shall endure." Duncan was confined to the town of Dundee, and deposed on 10 May 1620. In 1621 he presented a supplication in name of certain ministers to the Lord Clerk Register, for which he was confined by the Privy Council in Dunbarton Castle. He was liberated 2 October, and allowed to reside in any parish but Crail or Edinburgh. He went to Kilrenny, but was obliged to leave there for Berwick-upon-Tweed, where his great pecuniary difficulties were relieved "almost miraculously" by an unknown lady. He died in 1626, aged about 66.

== Family ==
He married Jean Liwell, and had issue —

- John;
- William;
- David;
- Bessie,
- and three others, who predeceased him.

== Works ==
- Latina Grammatica, par. prior sive etymologia Latina in usum radiorum (Edinburgh, 1595)
- Appendix Etymologiae ad copiam exemploram (Edinburgh, 1595)
- Rudimenta Pietatis (Edinburgh, 1595)
- Studiorum Puerilium Clavis miro quodam compendio (Edinburgh, 1597)
- Admonition to the Hie Commission
- Letters to the Bishop of St Andrews (Calderwood's Hist., vii., 181
- Orig. Lett., ii.).

== Bibliography ==
- Reg. Assig.
- Booke of the Kirk
- Pitcairn's Criminal Trials, ii., 494, 503
- Livingston's Charac
