= General Assembly of Aberdeen =

1605 meeting of the General Assembly of the Church of Scotland

The disastrous General Assembly of Aberdeen was held in 1605. A few ministers of the Presbyterian party met in defiance of royal authority as the general assembly was prohibited by royal proclamation. There was doubt about the legality of the sederunt and the cancelling or the prorogation of the assembly; several of the ministers denied that the king had the authority in what they regarded as a purely spiritual matter. The king disagreed and several who met were tried at Linlithgow for high treason and exiled. They were: John Forbes of Alford; John Welch of Ayr, (the son-in-law of John Knox); Andrew Duncan; Robert Dury, Anstruther; Alexander Strachan, Creich; and John Sharp, Kilmany. After the assembly King James gave more power to his bishops.

== Context ==
At the date of King James's accession to the English Crown the Church of Scotland was as thoroughly Presbyterian in form as in 1592, the only difference being that certain of the ministers, in addition to their pastoral duties, had been admitted to have voice in Parliament. The ruling power resided not in these so-called bishops, who had no episcopal jurisdiction, but in the Commissioners of the Assembly, whose duty it was to advise the King in all things ecclesiastical, to maintain peace and concord between the Crown and the Church, and in particular, to take order with regard to "any enormity" of which the King might complain in the conduct of the clergy. Representative as it was, this Commission never failed to maintain its character as " the King's led horse," for, with the exception of the two Melvilles, Davidson, and Bruce, the moderate party now included all the leading men in the Church; but, as every Assembly meant the appointment of a new Commission, it greatly concerned the King to maintain his influence in the Assembly, and with that view to fix at pleasure its time and place of meeting. Thus the Assembly, which was to have met at Aberdeen in July 1599, was appointed by royal proclamation to meet at Montrose in March 1600; in 1601, the Assembly fixed for July at St. Andrews was anticipated by the King at Burntisland in May; and the Assembly of 1602 was postponed from July to November, and its place of meeting changed from St. Andrews to the King's own chapel at Holyrood. In thus asserting the royal authority at the expense of the Church James violated, or at all events suspended, the Act of 1592, which provided that an Assembly should be held every year, or oftener, at the time and place appointed by the King or his Commissioner in the last Assembly, or in their absence by the Assembly itself; and in the meeting at Holyrood in 1602 he agreed that this Act should be observed in future. Nevertheless, the next Assembly, appointed to meet at Aberdeen in July 1604, was prorogued to July 1605, before which date it was prorogued again this time indefinitely; and it appears from one of his letters that James had resolved to dispense with Assemblies altogether.

== Opposition to the king's policy ==
The Melville party, or what remained of it, had now some reason to be alarmed; for, if the Assembly did not meet on the day fixed, the right to summon such a court would pass wholly from the Church to the Crown. The Presbytery of St. Andrews had sent three ministers to Aberdeen in July 1604; and nineteen ministers, followed by nine others who endorsed the proceedings in which they arrived too late to take part, convened there on 22 July 1605. John Forbes, one of the ministers, had an understanding with the Chancellor, Lord Dunfermline, that they would be allowed to meet, if they did no more in their Assembly than merely prorogue it to another day; and the letter from the Council presented by Straiton of Lauriston, the King's Commissioner, being addressed, "To our Traist Friends, the Brethren of the Ministry convened at their Assembly in Aberdeen," they resolved to constitute themselves an Assembly before they opened it. The letter, however, proved to be an order to dissolve at once without appointing any new meeting; and when the ministers insisted on adjourning to the first Tuesday of September, Straiton, who had hitherto made no opposition and had even suggested Forbes as Moderator, protested that he had never acknowledged them to be a lawful Assembly, and charged them to disperse on pain of treason. He and his friends realised too late that the holding of this Assembly might extinguish the Commission appointed by the last; and the Council were easily persuaded to accept his story, contrary as it was to their own instructions, that he had prohibited the Assembly by open proclamation on the previous day.

== Consequences ==
For refusing to condemn their proceedings at Aberdeen six of the ministers, including Forbes and Knox's son-in-law, John Welsh, were imprisoned in Blackness Castle. Of the whole number, one was released at the request of the Earl of Morton; four were not summoned at all; and about a third, through the exertions of David Lindsay, were brought to pronounce the Assembly illegal. The rest, fourteen in number, were cited before the Council on 24 October; and as they would consent to plead only after presenting a written protest that they did not recognise the jurisdiction of the court, it was determined in January 1606, to bring the six Blackness prisoners to trial under the statute of 1584, which had been passed in consequence of Melville's declinature, but which had not been enforced against Black, with the whole Church behind him, in 1596. That it should be enforced now against a handful of brave men, the last devoted champions of a ruined cause, was felt on all hands to be cruelly and scandalously unjust; and at the close of the proceedings at Linlithgow James was assured by the Crown lawyers that but for his own exertions the prosecution would certainly have failed. The Earl of Dunbar, formerly one of the Cubiculars, had been sent down from Court to overawe the judges, to pack the jury, and to fill the town with his friends and retainers. But the prisoners were ably defended by their counsel; Forbes and Welsh both made eloquent speeches; and after the jury had been coaxed and worried by Dunbar for more than six hours, nine only out of fifteen, and these his "private kinsmen and friends" could be brought to convict the accused; and of the minority, one said boldly in open court that he took them for "honest ministers, faithful servants to Christ, and good subjects." All the ministers might easily have purchased their pardon by withdrawing their declinature; but this they resolutely refused to do. In October 1606 the Blackness prisoners were banished for life; and the other eight, whom the Crown dared not bring to trial, were sent to the Hebrides, Caithness, and Ireland. By such questionable means James got rid of fourteen formidable opponents; and in August of this year he had disposed of eight more, including the two Melvilles, by calling them up to London to confer with him and their brethren on the state of the Church. Andrew Melville was never to see Scotland again. For an epigram on the Anglican service, written merely for his own amusement, he was summoned before the Council; and conducting himself there with something more than his usual vehemence, he was committed to the Tower. After an imprisonment of four years he was permitted to retire to France; and he died at Sedan in 1622. His nephew had predeceased him at Berwick in 1614.

== Aftermath ==
Meanwhile, in accordance with the Act of the Assembly of 1602, James had filled up all the vacant bishoprics. (Note: For the Aberdeen Assembly and its results, see the account given by John Forbes, the Moderator, in his Records touching the Estate of the Church, pp. 383-558, the documents printed in Calderwood, vol. vi., and Botfield's Original Letters. Burton's reference to this Assembly is an extraordinary example of his careless habit of writing. v. 433. There are at least five errors in as many lines. On page 436 of the same volume he entirely misapplies a letter of the Presbytery of Edinburgh to the King. 15 November 1608, Botfield's Original Letters, i. 166. The Presbytery does not congratulate the King on his proceedings against the Melville party, as Burton supposes, but on his proceedings against the Papists.) In July 1603, Spottiswoode, David Lindsay's son-in-law, was made Archbishop of Glasgow; soon afterwards Gladstanes was translated from Caithness to St. Andrews; and occupants were found for the sees of Caithness, Orkney, the Isles, Galloway, and Moray. The events of 1605, as well as his experience of the English hierarchy, must have quickened James's desire to establish a more permanent government in the Church than that of Commissioners whose authority lasted only from one Assembly to another; but in order to restore the jurisdiction of the bishops it was necessary, or at least advisable to restore their estates, and to that there was likely to be considerable opposition. The nobles had already become jealous of the new prelates. It was supposed to have been from this motive that the Chancellor had encouraged Forbes to hold the Assembly at Aberdeen a fact which was speedily made known to the King by Archbishop Spottiswoode, and afterwards in self-defence by Forbes himself; and others of the Council, especially Lord Balmerino, President of the Session, were suspected of being unfriendly to the bishops.

== See also ==
- Archibald Simson
- Patrick Simson
