= Blackness, Falkirk =

Coordinates: 56°00′13″N 03°31′19″W

Blackness: Scottish Gaelic: An t-Sròn Dhubh
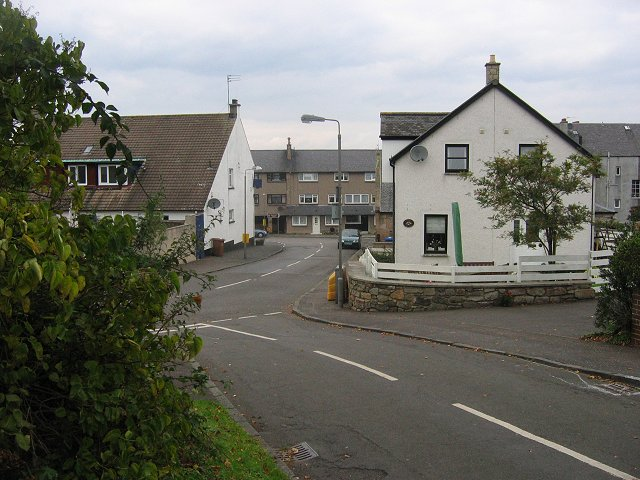
- A view of houses in the village of Blackness

- Location within the Falkirk council area
- Population: 135 (2001 census)
- OS grid reference: NT051800
  - Edinburgh: 13.4 mi (21.6 km) SE
  - London: 341 mi (549 km) SSE
- Civil parish: Bo'ness and Carriden
- Council area: Falkirk
- Country: Scotland
- Sovereign state: United Kingdom
- Post town: LINLITHGOW
- Postcode district: EH49
- Dialling code: 01506
- Police: Scotland
- Fire: Scottish
- Ambulance: Scottish
- UK Parliament: Bathgate and Linlithgow
- Scottish Parliament: Falkirk East
- Website: falkirk.gov.uk

Blackness is a small village and harbour at Blackness Bay, an inlet of the Firth of Forth in Scotland. It lies 3.4 mi (5.5 km) east-southeast of Bo'ness, 5.0 mi (8.0 km) west-northwest of South Queensferry and 3.8 mi (6.1 km) north-east of Linlithgow, within the council area of Falkirk. It was formerly part of the historic county of West Lothian.

At the 2001 Census Blackness was reported as having a population of around 135 residents.

== History ==
The village originally served as a port for nearby Linlithgow, which was a principal residence of the Scottish monarchs from as early as the 12th century. James IV gave the village to one of his household servants, John Kirkwood, Master of the Larder, in January 1502. As a port, Blackness was later superseded by Bo'ness, and fell into decline in the late 17th century.

There are two listed houses in the village. Blackness House is an early 19th century Georgian house that is Category B listed. Blackness Low Valley House is a mid-18th century house that is Category C listed.

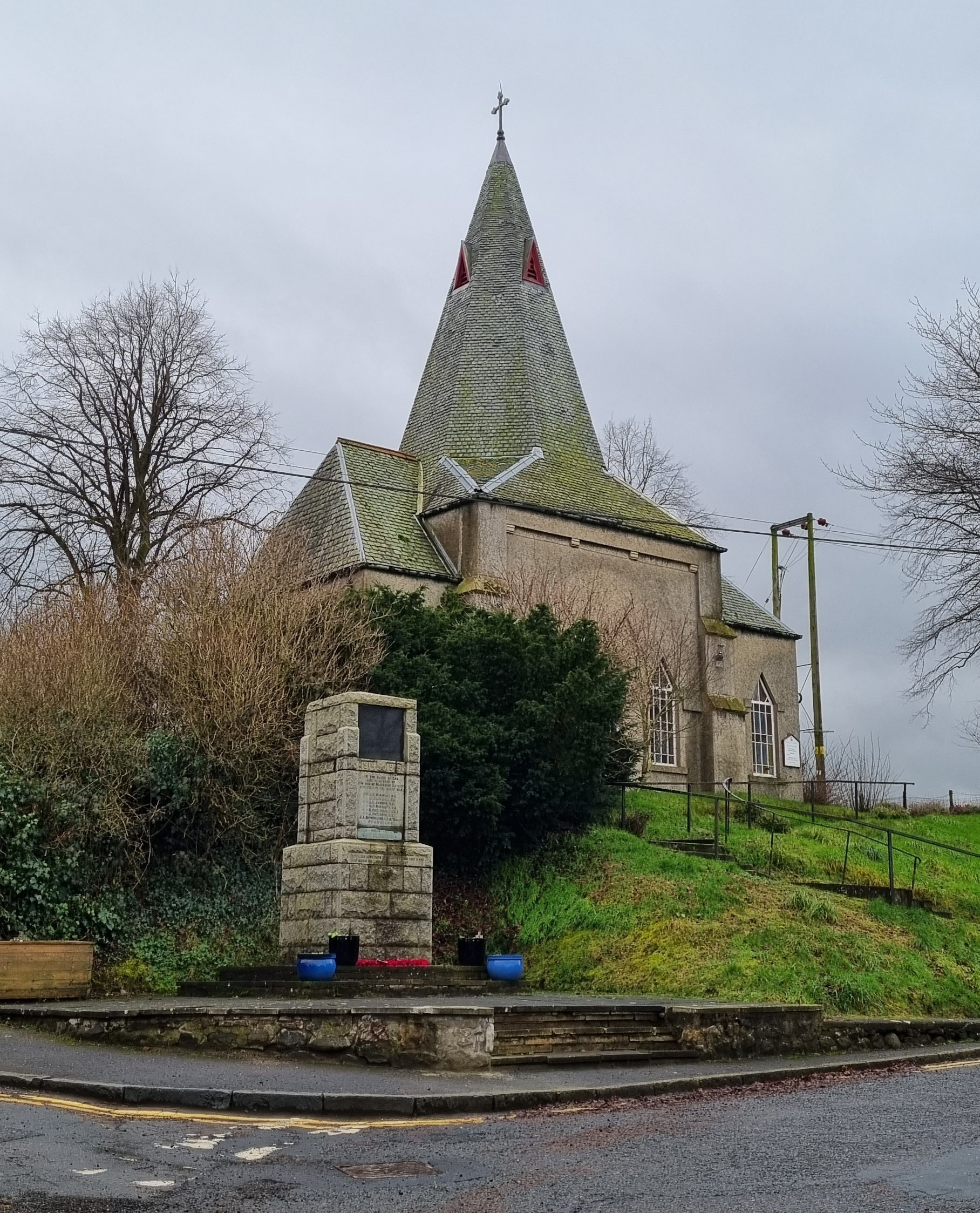
Blackness Mission Church and village war memorial

In 1875, a public water hand-pump was installed in the village and this is, along with a newer hand-pump, located against a wall opposite a block of flats in the center of the village.

In 1914, the St Ninian’s Blackness Mission Church was erected in the village.

On 23 December 1922, the village First World War memorial was unveiled. The memorial also records names from the Second World War.

The old smithy has long since shut its doors, as has the post office and the dairy which once operated from the village.

=== Blackness Castle ===
The small village is dominated by Blackness Castle, situated on a promontory overlooking the bay. The castle primarily dates to the early 15th century being built by Sir George Crichton, Earl of Caithness and Admiral of Scotland. It served as a fortified residence and a prison before passing to Crown ownership under James II of Scotland in 1453. Additional modifications to the castle were made in the 16th and 17th centuries in response to the development of artillery. From 1870 until 1912, Blackness castle was the central munitions depot for Scotland and housed officers and men in a nearby barracks block and officers quarters. The castle is currently under the care of Historic Scotland and open to paying visitors. The castle and surrounding area has been used as a setting for several films and tv series including Hamlet, the Starz series Outlander and the BBC production of Ivanhoe.

== Community facilities ==
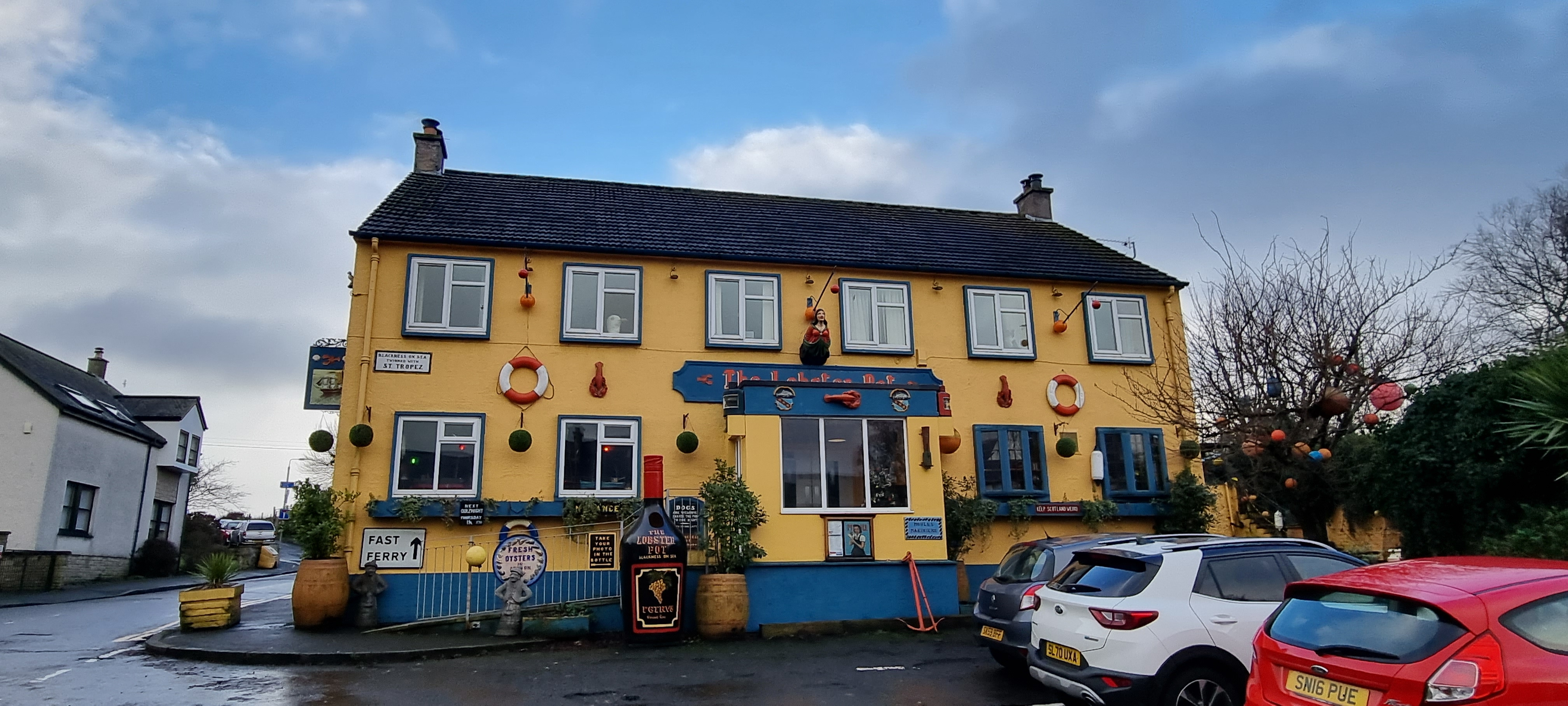
The Lobsterpot pub and community shop

Blackness Yacht Club currently use the village as a base for its sailing activities. In addition to the castle and the boat club, the village contains a small variety community shop and a pub restaurant named The Lobsterpot that was the site of a former pub and adjacent to the 17th century Customs House.

There is a public toilets in Blackness that is the last open public toilets in the Falkirk council area.

There is a primary school on the western edge of Blackness. In 2022, it was reported that the school had only 8 pupils on its rolls and Falkirk Council were considering closing the school.

There is limited parking in the village for visitors which resulted in a public vote taking place in the village in 2020 to decide on public access.

== See also ==
- List of places in Falkirk council area
