= Robert Durie =

Scottish church leader (1555–1616)

Personal details
- Born: 1555
- Died: September 1616 (aged 60–61) Leyden, The Netherlands
- Denomination: Church of Scotland
- Parents: John Durie
- Spouse: Elizabeth Ramsay
- Children: John, 4 other sons, and 4 daughters
- Education: St. Mary's College, St. Andrews

Robert Durie (1555 – September 1616) was a Scottish presbyterian minister. He achieved notoriety for his presbyterian principles which brought him into conflict with James VI who wished to impose an episcopalian system. He attended the General Assembly of Aberdeen in 1605 which had been prorogued by royal authority and was one of six ministers who were imprisoned and later exiled as a result.

== Life ==
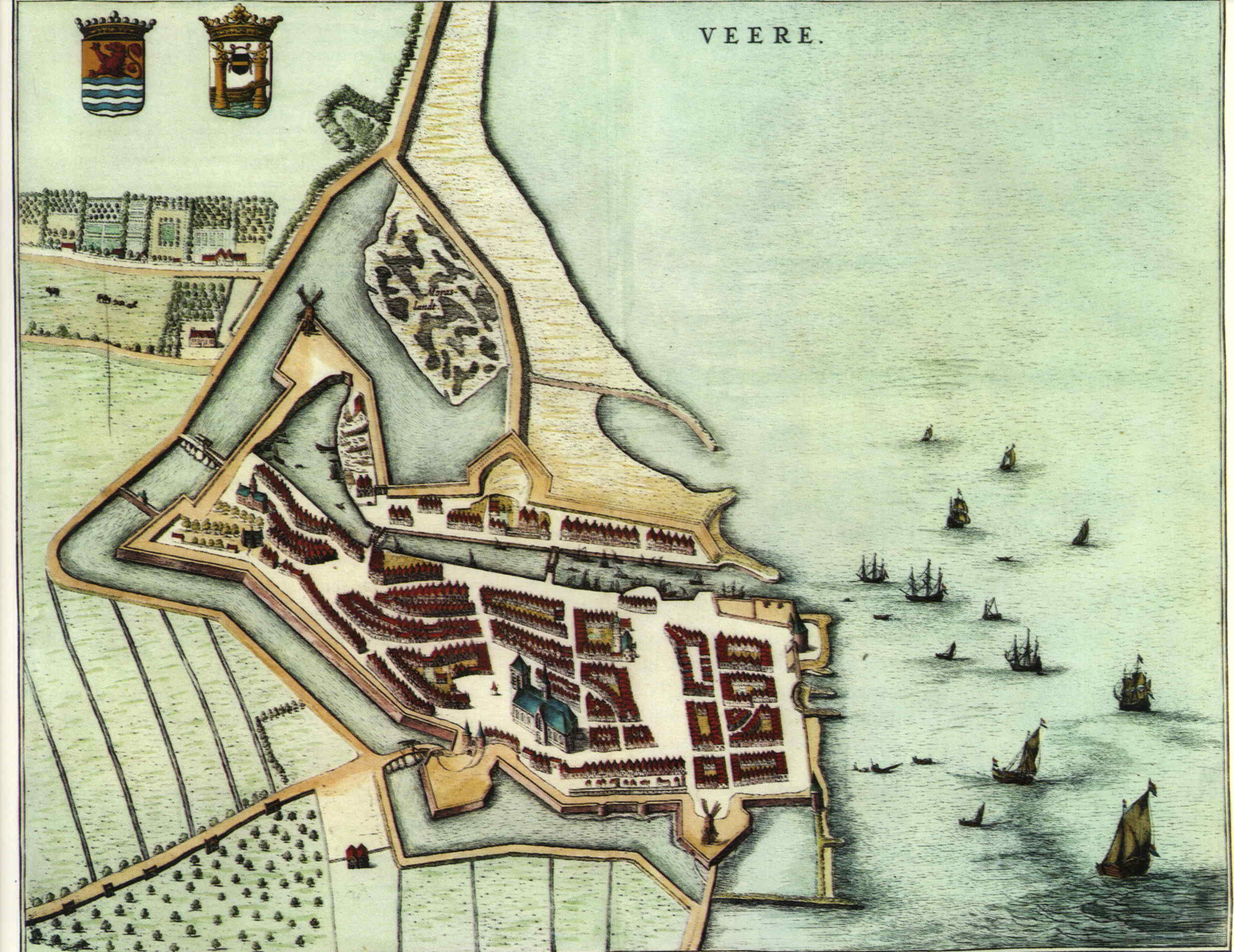
Map of Veere, known in Scotland as Campvere. Durie and John Forbes preached here until they were ordered to leave. Durie later became minister of the English speaking church in Amsterdam

Durie was second son of John Durie. He studied at St. Mary's College, St. Andrews and visited La Rochelle. While at St Andrew he, and James Melville tutored Robert Bruce. He stayed with James Melville, whose wife was his sister; accompanied Melville to the parliament of Linlithgow in December 1585, and to Berwick-on-Tweed in September 1586. He became subsequently assistant to the schoolmaster of Dunfermline, and minister of Abercrombie, Fife in 1588, and of Anstruther in 1590. He took part in the Church of Scotland mission to the Isle of Lewis in 1598, to evangelise the population, which set up ten parish churches. In 1601, Durie visited the Orkney Islands and Zetland, and gave an account of his journey to the General Assembly of 1602.

In 1605, Durie attended as a member the General Assembly of Aberdeen, which the king James VI had prohibited, but which ministers repudiating his jurisdiction had insisted on holding. For this offence he was summoned before the privy council, and on 18 July sent to Blackness Castle. He and five others were tried at Linlithgow on 10 January 1606 for treasonably declining the jurisdiction of the council. Being found guilty, they were banished from the kingdom. Durie, after landing at Bordeaux, went to Holland, where he was admitted first minister of the Scottish church at Leyden, where he died in September 1616.

He was one of the closest friends of Andrew Melville, who was in banishment at Sedan when Durie was at Leyden. At one time it was rumoured that a pardon had been given to Durie, but Melville warned him not to trust the rumour, having grounds for suspecting some foul play. He contributed a commendatory sonnet to James Melville's Spirituall Propine, 1589.

== Family ==
National Scottish Church Rotterdam

He married Elizabeth Ramsay, who survived him, and had issue —

- Agnes;
- Andrew;
- Eliezer;
- John, minister of the English Merchants' or Court Kirk at Rotterdam, well known for his endeavours to accomplish a union between the Lutheran and other reformed churches, author of various works, born at Edinburgh 1596, died at Cassel 28 Sept. 1680;
- James;
- Margaret;
- Nanse;
- Jean;
- Robert, presented for baptism 8 March 1607 by George Ramsay of Langraw.

== Bibliography ==
- Reg. Assig.
- Reg. of Deeds, xli.
- Booke of the Kirk
- M'Crie's Melville, i. 328, ii. 119, 122
- Forbes's Records
- Pitcairn's Criminal Trials, ii., 494, 503
- N. Archief vour Kietel Geschied, viii.
- Steven's Scot. Church, Rotterdam, 312, 315
- Fischer's Scots in Germany, 175-85
