= Alexander Strachan =

Scottish church leader fl. 1605

Personal details
- Died: 1607 Middelburg
- Denomination: Church of Scotland

Alexander Strachan (died 1607) was church of Scotland minister. He was exiled following the General Assembly of Aberdeen for not retreating from his presbyterian principles.

== Life ==
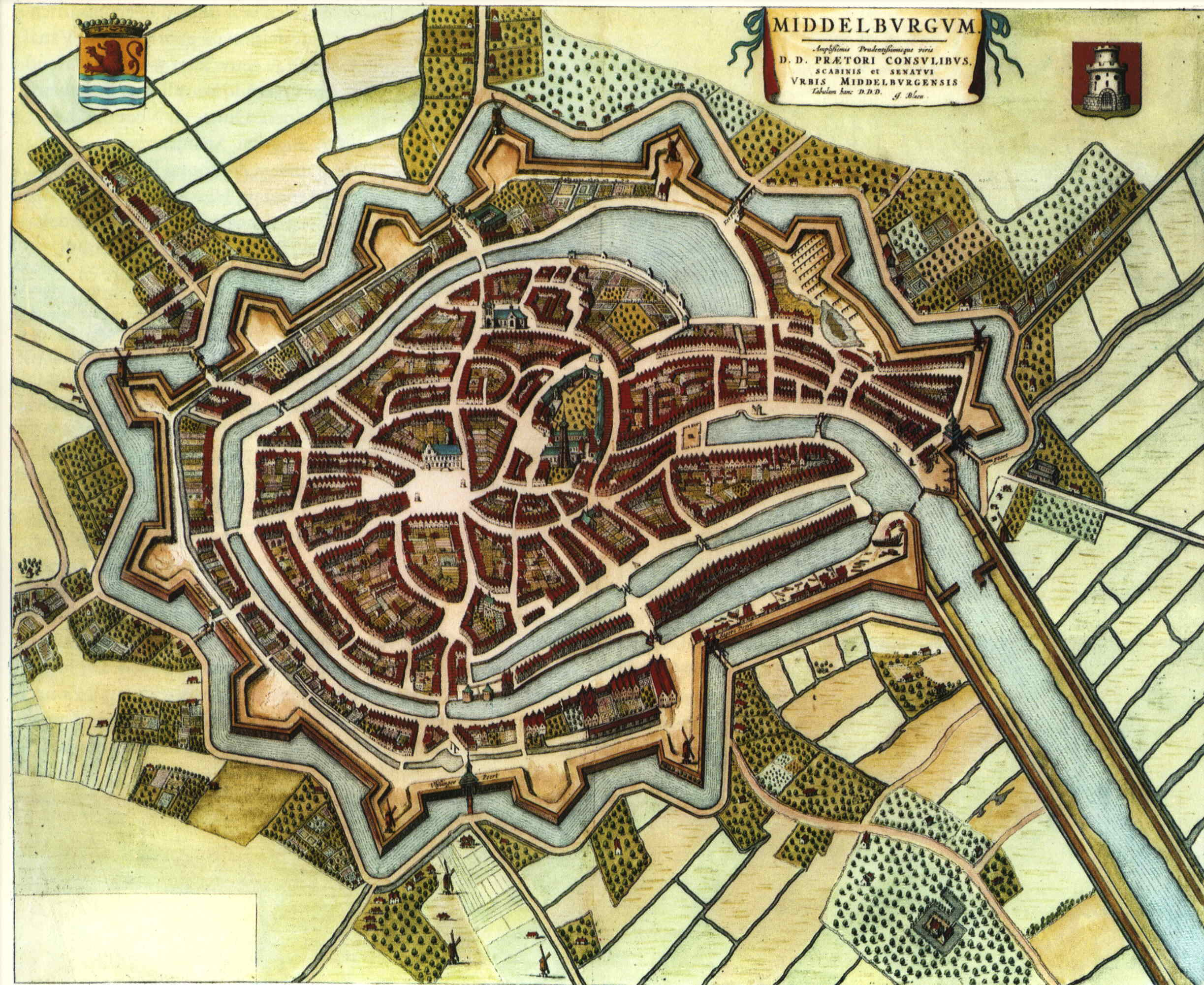
Middelburg in 1652.

Alexander Strachan was on the Exercise at St Andrews 28 June 1593. He was admitted to Second Charge, Cupar, before 1599. He was translated, and admitted to Creich about 1605. Strachan was one of those who constituted the General Assembly of Aberdeen on 2 July 1605, against the King's wishes, for which he was denounced on 18 July, and imprisoned at Blackness Castle on 3 August. He was tried before the Lords of Justiciary on 10 January 1606. As a result he was banished for life. He went to Holland where he died of fever in Middelburg in 1607, after petitioning the King in vain for liberty to return on account of his health.

== Bibliography ==
- Calderwood's Hist., vi. 284, 289 et seq.
- Pitcairn's Criminal Trials in Scotland, ii., 494, 503
- Melvill's Autobiography
- P. C. Reg., xiv., 422
