= John Welsh of Irongray =

Scottish minister (c. 1624–1681)

John Welsh
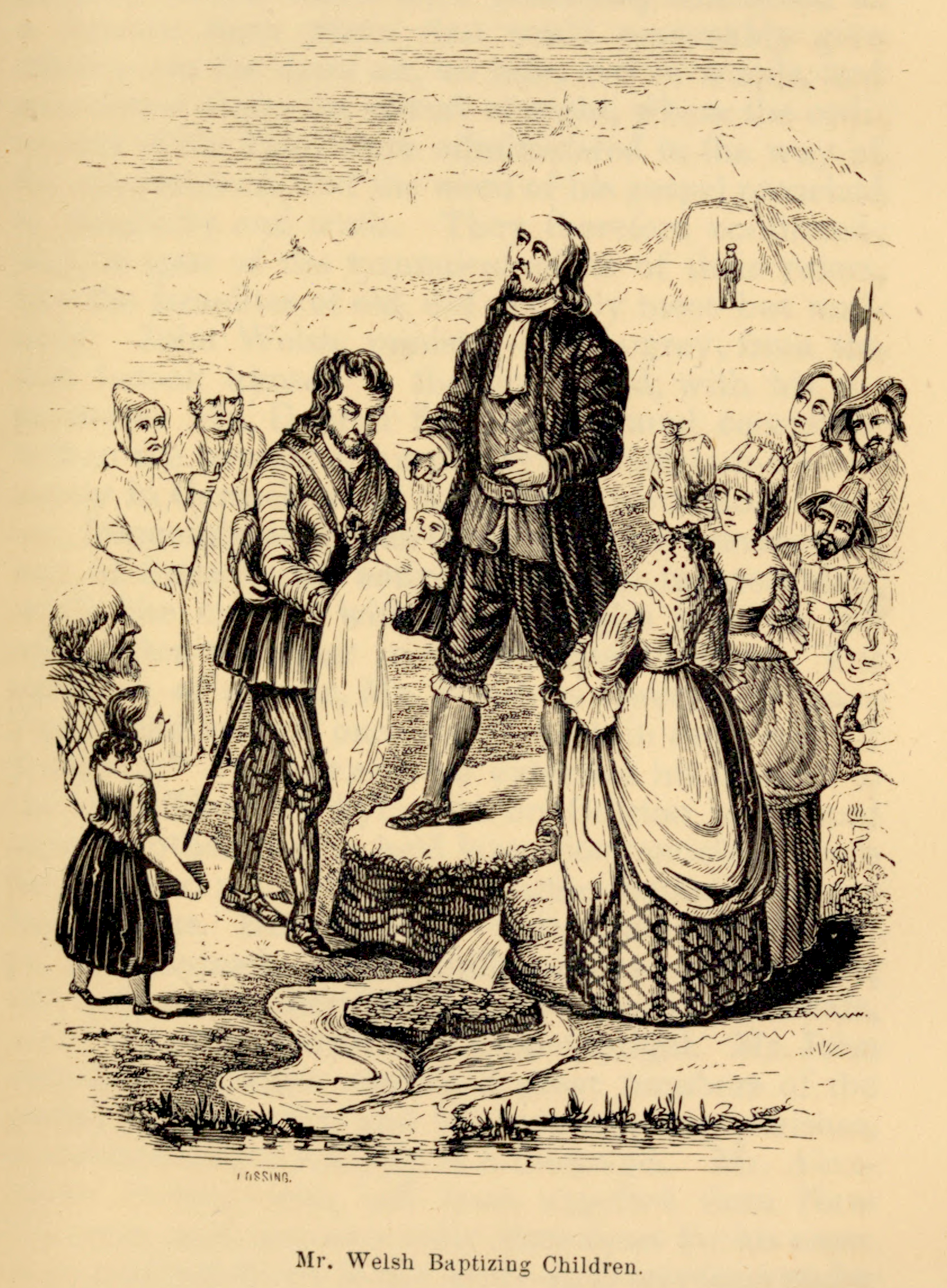
- etching of Mr. Welch baptising children
- Church: Church of Scotland

Personal details
- Born: c. 1624
- Died: 9 January 1681 London
- Buried: St. Botolph, Bishopsgate City of London
- Denomination: Presbyterian
- Occupation: minister
- Education: University of Glasgow

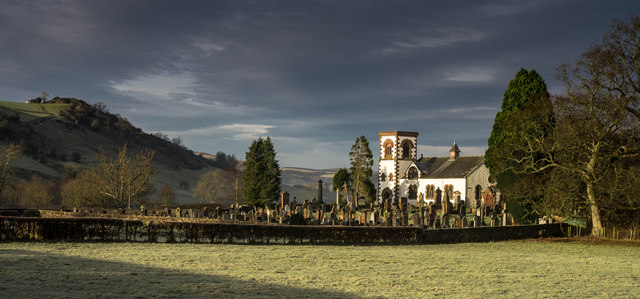
Morning light at Irongray

John Welsh ejected from Irongray

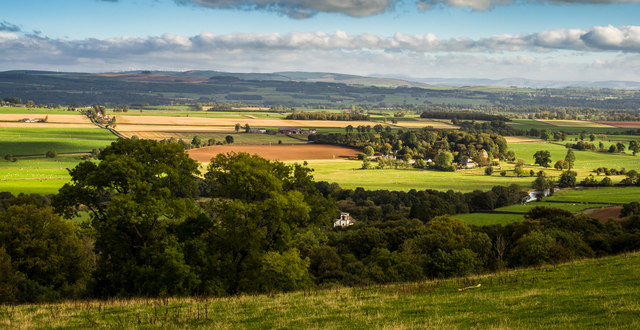
Irongray Vista

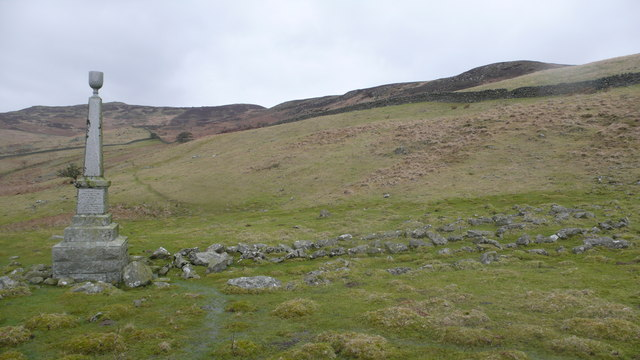
Covenanters Communion Monument and stones- Skeoch Hill

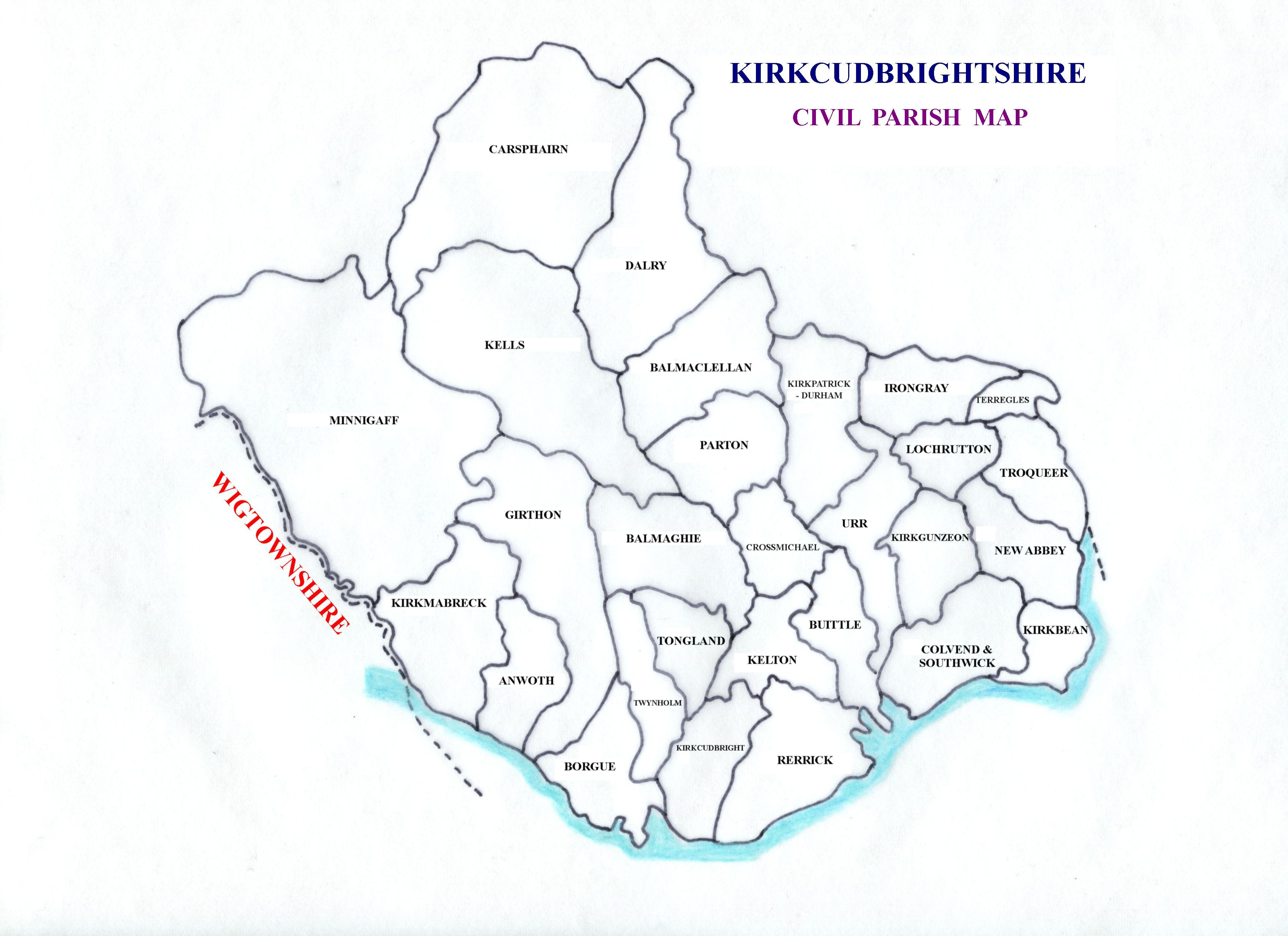
Kirkcudbrightshire, Civil Parish map

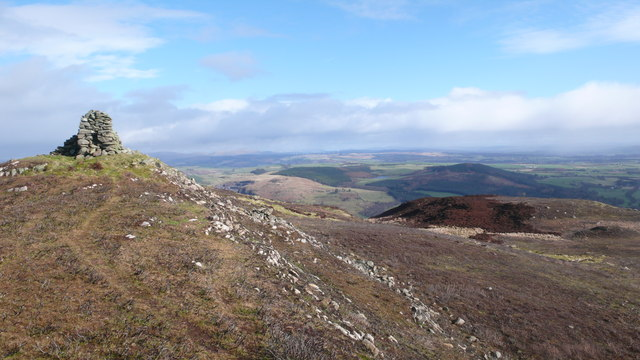
Hilltop cairn on Bishop Forest Hill

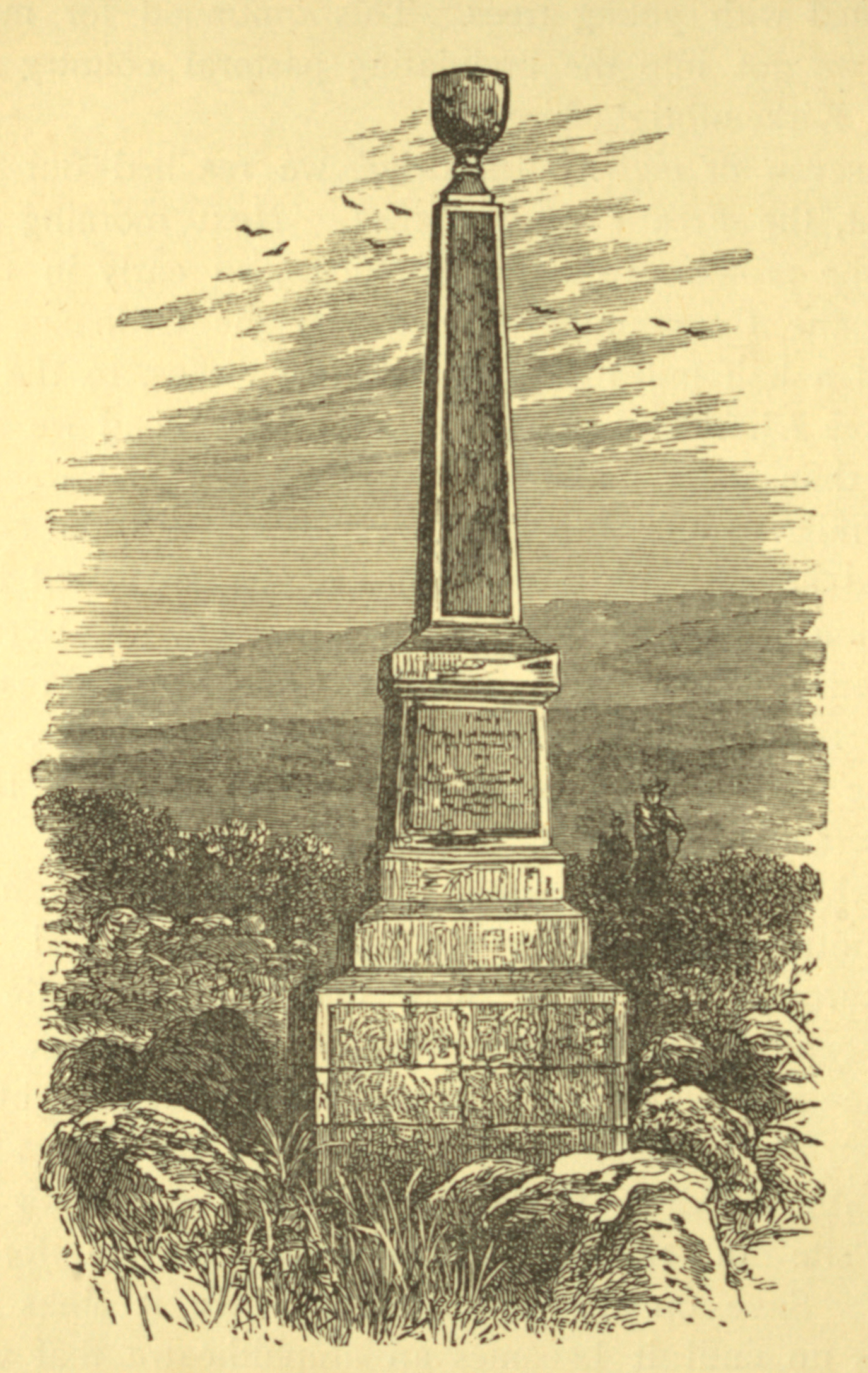
obelisk at Irongray

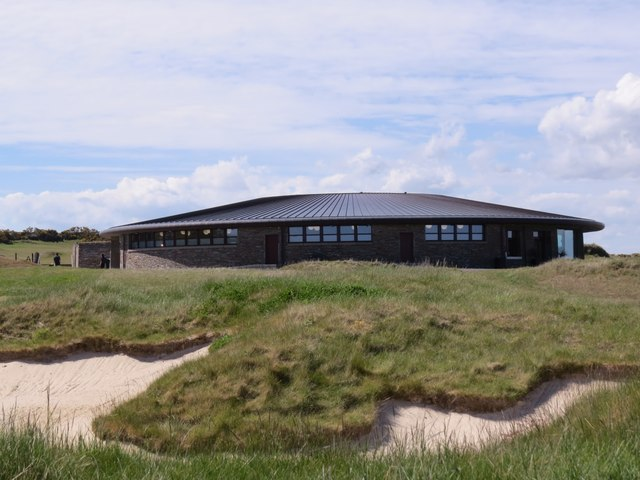
The Castle Golf Course Clubhouse built on the site of Kinkell Castle in whose grounds Welsh and Blackader held conventicles.

John Michael Welsh of Irongray (c. 1624–1681) was a leader of the Scottish Covenanter movement. Dunlop, an early 20th century writer, says: "It is a noteworthy fact that there exists no memoir of John Welsh of Irongray, though from the Battle of Rullion Green till Bothwell Bridge he was the most conspicuous Covenanting minister in Scotland. Had he glorified God in the Grassmarket, or fallen in some scuffle with Claverhouse's dragoons, or even like his friend Blackadder of Troqueer languished in prison on the Bass Rock, some pious hand would have been moved to write his story." Dunlop also wrote: "The events of Welsh's life must be sought for in the pages of Wodrow and Kirkton and in the letters and State papers of the reign of Charles II. After spending a fortnight hunting him in the British Museum, I have come to sympathise with Clavers and his dragoons. Mr John Welsh is a most elusive gentleman."

== Early life and ministry ==
John Welsh was born, probably in 1624, son of Josias Welsh, minister at Templepatrick, County Antrim, grandson of John Welsh of Ayr, and great-grandson of John Knox. He graduated with an M.A. from Glasgow University in 1647, and he was admitted to Irongray on the Cluden Water, Dumfrieshire, on 21 January 1653. At the insistance of a heritor, David M'Brear of Newark and Almagill, M.P. for the Stewartry of Kirkcudbright, he was accused before the Privy Council, June 1662, of having called Middleton's Parliament "a drunken Parliament", but was acquitted since the witnesses' testimony did not agree. Soon after the restoration of Episcopacy he was deprived. His congregation used force to prevent a new minister being settled. The Privy Council imposed their will with increased force. It was probably in February, 1663, that John Welsh was outed from Irongray. He seems to have sought refuge with John Neilson of Corsack, where other outed preachers, Gabriel Semple of Kirkpatrick-Durham and Blackadder of Troqueer also found shelter. Ejected ministers were forbidden to reside within twenty miles of their parishes, six miles of Edinburgh or any cathedral church, or three miles of any royal burgh. "Conditions which," as Wodrow remarks, " the nicest geographer would find hard to satisfy." They were pretty nearly satisfied in Welsh's case. At Corsack, Welsh's first wife died. (Wodrow ii., 4, 5, 6, Veitch's Memoirs, Blackadder 24.) It was probably too at Corsack that Welsh penned his pamphlet, "Fifty and Two Directions to Irongray."

== Field preaching and Rullion Green ==
Welsh was among the first who decided to preach in the fields against law, indeed, he is credited with being the inventor of the field conventicles of the Covenanters. In January, 1666, he was proclaimed for this, along with Semple and Blackadder, by the Privy Council. "Particularly the said Mr John Welsh does presume frequently, at least once every week, to preach in the parish of Irongray in the Presbytery of Dumfries, and himself and those who frequent his conventicles do convene together armed with swords and pistols; at which meetings he also baptizes children which are brought to him by disaffected persons."

He is recorded as giving communion to between 3000 and 6000 people along with John Blackadder at Bishop's Forest, Irongray. There is a monument and Communion Stones at Skeoch Hill.

He was probably the first of the field-preachers; was concerned in the Pentland Rising, and fled before Dalyell's troopers at Rullion Green. Welsh was at the battle, and left it with the insurgent leader, Colonel Wallace. Whether he fled with Wallace to Holland is not known, but for nearly two years we hear nothing about him. Two parishioners and namesakes of Welsh were present at the battle, Welsh of Skaar and Welsh of Cornlee. They were among those who were exempted from the indemnity after Pentland.

== A wanted man ==
In 1667 he was hiding in a friend's house in Edinburgh, but soon afterwards he ventured into Clydesdale. Welsh may have found shelter in his own parish, but probably he was nearer his pursuers than they imagined; at any rate in 1668 he was lurking at the house of one Robert Grey in Edinburgh. (Kirkton, 1668.) Towards the end of the year he was preaching. The Earl of Tweeddale writes in November, 1668, to the Earl of Lauderdale that Mr John Welsh was running about Clydesdale and keeping conventicles both in houses and in the Church of Cambusnethan.

== In Fife ==
He preached in Fife to large crowds drawn from all classes. On one occasion, John Welsh preached to a large crowd at Kinkell, near St Andrews.

Philip Standfield, son of Sir James Standfield and a student at St Andrews University, attended the sermon and threw some missile that struck the preacher. Welsh said "I do not know who has put this public affront on Christ; but, be he who he may, there shall be more at his death than hearing me preach today". This turned out to be true, for the young man was later hanged for murdering his father.

== In Northern England ==
Robert Traill spent much time with him. When in England he spent some time in Carlisle. In August 1671 he was in Northumberland, where, says Wodrow, " he dwelt for some time very pleasantly." He preached "when Tweed was frozen in the midst of the river, that either he might shun the offence of both nations, or that two kingdoms might dispute his crime." In 1677 he dispensed the Communion at Skeochhill, in Irongray, where the "Communion Stones" are still pointed out. He was present at Drumclog and Bothwell Bridge.

== Return to Scotland ==
In the spring of 1677 Welsh and other Covenanting preachers were back in Scotland. With Blackader and Riddel he held a communion at Eckford in Teviotdale.

== In London ==
About 1679 he went to London, where he died on 9 January 1681, and was buried in St Botulph Churchyard, Bishopsgate. In a note of Miss Foxcroft to the supplement to Burnet's History (p. 103) it stated that he lived principally with Shaftesbury after Bothwell Bridge, and may thus have supplied Burnet with materials for his History.

His death caused no small stir in London. Lord Fountainhall mentions it in his Diary, adding : – "He was not so gross as to disown the King, as the Cameronians did: his grandfather, Mr John Welsh, was a great enemy of the bishops, and died in France." Wodrow, on the authority of a son of Hamilton of Kinkell, says that "Mr Welsh's burial was the greatest that for many years had been seen in London; that most of the Dissenters changed their text that Sabbath he was buried; that their congregations were invited to the burial, at which there was a vast number of ministers, persons of fashion, and, if my memory fails me not, some hundreds of coaches."

== Family life ==
He married his first wife at Holyrood, on 18 February 1653, Elizabeth Somerville, who died at Corsock. He then remarried in 1674, a lady whose name is unknown.

Son: Edward Alexander Welsh md (married) Sarah Gaines: Grandson: Robert Alexander Welsh md Judith Barr: Great Grandson: John Robert Welsh md Anne Elizabeth Heggerty: 2nd Great Grandson: William Patrick Welsh md Johanna Cloughlan: 3rd Great Grandson Michael Patrick Welsh md Mary Ann Dunn.

== Works ==
- A Preface, Lecture, and a Sermon (1686);
- Fifty and Two Directions . . . to his Paroch of Irongray (Edinburgh, 1703);
- A Sermon preached at Nemphlar Brae in Clidsdale (Edinburgh, 1703);
- An Alarm to the Impenitent (1710);
- The Great Gospel Sumonds to Close with Christ (Edinburgh, 1710);
- The Church's Paradox (n.d.);
- Two Sermons appear in Faithful Contendings Displayed, See also Sermons Delivered in Times of Persecution, and Simpson's Voice from the Desert

== Bibliography ==
- Memoirs of Blackader, 241;
- Wodrow's Hist., ii., 342, passim;
- Treasury of the Scottish Covenant. 352;
- Transactions of the Dumfries and Galloway Natural History and Antiquarian Society, 1912-13
