= John Welsh of Ayr =

Scottish minister in Ayr and France (c. 1570–1622)

John Welsh
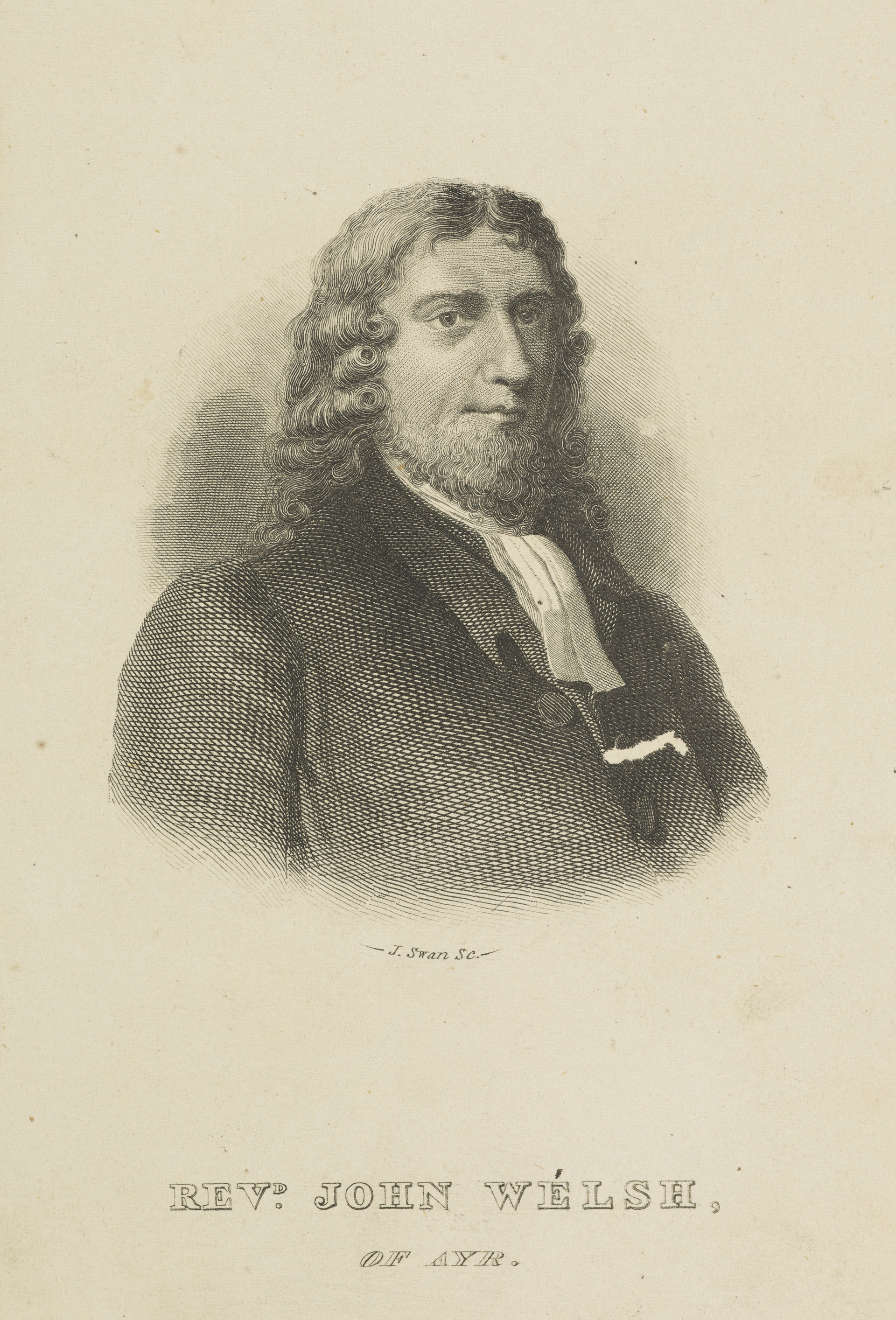
- John Welsh by Joseph Swan

Personal details
- Born: John Welsh (also spelled Welch) c. 1570 Dunscore
- Died: 2 April 1622 London
- Buried: St Botolph, Bishopsgate
- Denomination: Presbyterian
- Spouse: Elizabeth Knox
- Education: University of Edinburgh

John Welsh (c. 1570–1622) was a Scottish Presbyterian leader. He was born in Dumfriesshire and attended the University of Edinburgh to obtain his MA in 1588. He became a minister in Selkirk and married Elizabeth Knox, a daughter of John and Margaret Knox, before leaving Selkirk. Welsh later ministered at Kirkcudbright and Ayr, the latter of which was where he spent five years. His preaching resulted in his imprisonment by the order of King James VI of Scotland. The lawyer Thomas Hamilton wrote to James VI about Welsh, John Forbes, and others; the case was important because many Scottish subjects of James were devoted to the ministers. In 1606 Welsh was exiled to France, where he continued to preach. John Welsh of Ayr was the father of Josias Welsh and the grandfather of John Welsh of Irongray.

== Life ==
A Chapbook of the History of the life & sufferings of the Rev. John Welch

John Welsh was the son of the laird of Collieston (or Colliston), and was born in the parish of Dunscore, Dumfriesshire around 1570. When he was young he ran away from home and joined a band of border reivers. After he learned being a reiver was less glamorous than expected, he sought reconciliation with his father, and was sent to the University of Edinburgh, where he obtained an MA in 1588. On 6 March 1589 he was nominated by the Privy Council as one of three people for maintaining the true religion in the Forest and Tweeddale, and was settled at Selkirk. In 1594 he was transferred to Kirkcudbright, and on 29 March 1596 he was appointed one of the visitors for Nithsdale, Annandale, Lauderdale, Eskdale, and Ewesdale.

On 18 December, while occupying the pulpit of St Giles' Cathedral, Welsh preached against King James VI of Scotland's conduct shortly after the Presbyterians revolted against the king. He "[alleged] that his majesty was possessed of a devil, and after the outputting of that devil there joined to his highness seven devils, quhilk was his majesty's council"; and that as it was lawful for a son to bind a lunatic father, it was equally lawful "to his highness's subjects to bind his majesty, being in the like case". After failing to answer the charge of having justified the tumult, Welsh was denounced as a rebel on 17 January (ib.). On the petition of the assembly in the following March he was, mainly through the intervention of Lord Ochiltree (Moysie, Memoirs, p. 133), allowed to return to his charge.

Welsh was re-appointed as one of the visitors for Nithsdale at the assembly held at Montrose in March 1599 (Calderwood, vi. 23), and in August of the same year, he was transferred to the parish of Ayr as an assistant to John Porterfield. When he arrived he succeeded in quelling feuds and riots, and effected the reformation in public manners. His preaching attracted crowds such that the town council resolved to build a new church on 26 May 1603. He succeeded Porterfield after the latter died in 1604.

Although Welsh did not arrive in Aberdeen until two days after the July 1605 General Assembly had been held, he was ordered to become a ward or prisoner in Blackness Castle. As they had put in a declinature of the jurisdiction of the council in the matter the king decided to put them on trial for high treason, which was done at an assize held at Linlithgow, the majority was declared guilty. The punishment for high treason was normally death, but by the king's direction the sentence was commuted on 23 October 1606 to perpetual banishment from the king's dominion, and they were commanded to board a ship on 1 November that sailed from Leith to Bordeaux.

When Welsh arrived in France he immediately began to learn the French language, and within fourteen weeks he was able to preach in French. Shortly afterwards he became the pastors of the Protestant churches of Nerac, Jonsac, and eventually Saint-Jean-d'Angély in Saintonge, where he remained for sixteen years. The town council of Ayr continued to regularly remit his stipend as minister of the parish to him for several years after his banishment.

When Saint-Jean-d'Angély, a strongly fortified town, was besieged by King Louis XIII during the war against the Protestants in 1620, Welsh encouraged the citizens to form a resistance and helped operate the guns on the walls. After the town surrendered, he continued to preach as usual until he was summoned before the king, who reprimanded him for violating the law forbidding anyone from providing religious services other than the standard. Welsh replied that if the king knew what he preached he would himself both come to hear him and make all his subjects do the same, for what he preached was that there was none on earth above the king, which none who had adhered to the pope would say. His answer impressed the king, who answered, "Very well, father, you shall be my minister", and promised him his protection. When the town was captured again in the following year, the king ordered guards to be placed around the house of Welch and provided horses and wagons to convey him, his family, and his household goods to Rochelle in safety.

Welsh never returned to his charge and went to Zealand. He sent a petition to King James asking for permission to return to his native country, and obtained the freedom to go to London. Through John Young, Dean of Winchester, an attempt was unsuccessfully made to obtain a general approval of episcopacy from Welsh. When Welsh's wife went to King James to ask his remission, the king answered that he would pardon him if she would induce him to submit to the bishops. She replied that she would rather receive his severed head in her lap. On hearing that Welsh would die soon, the king granted his request for permission to preach in London. He died on 2 April 1622, two hours after concluding the services. He was survived by his wife Elizabeth, youngest daughter of John Knox the reformer, and four sons and two daughters, of whom Josias became minister of Temple Bar, or Temple Patrick, Ireland. Jane Welsh, the wife of Thomas Carlyle, claimed descent from Welsh.

== Family ==
Welsh married previous to 8 April 1596, Elizabeth (died at Ayr, 8 Jan. 1625), youngest daughter of John Knox the Reformer, and had issue—

- Jane Welsch Born abt 1592
- William Welsch Born abt 1595, doctor of physic, died before 1633
- Kate Welsch Born abt 1597
- Josias, minister of Temple-patrick, Ireland, died 1634
- John Welsch, baptised 8 June 1606
- Nathaniel Welsch Born abt 1604
- Mary Welsch Born abt 1607 as another.
- Phillip Sylvester Welsh Born abt 1610
- Lucy Louise Welsh Born abt 1613

== Works ==
- "Reply against Mr. Gilbert Browne, priest" (Edinburgh, 1602; another edition, Glasgow, 1672)
- "L'Armageddon de la Babylon Apocalyptique," Jonsac, 1612
- "Forty-eight Select Sermons … to which is prefixed the History of His Life and Sufferings," Glasgow, 1771, 8vo
- "Letters to Mr. Robert Boyd of Tochrig," in the Wodrow Society.
- Reply against Mr Gilbert Brown, priest (Edinburgh, 1602) [reprinted as Popery Anatomized by Matthew Crawford, minister of Eastwood (Glasgow, 1672)]
- Thirty-Five Sermons (Edinburgh, 1744)
- Discourses (1752)
- "Letters to Mr Robert Boyd of Trochrig" (Woodrow Miscell.)
- A Cry to the Whole Earth (Glasgow, 1785)
- Forty-eight Select Sermons (Glasgow, 1811)

== Bibliography ==
- Select Biographies in the Wodrow Society
- Hew Scott's Fasti Ecclesiæ Scoticanæ, ii. 85–6
- The History of Mr. John Welsh, Minister at Aire, Glasgow, 1703
- McCrie's Life of John Knox
- Chambers's Dictionary of Eminent Scotsmen
- Reg. Assig.
- Life (Sermons)
- Livingston's Charac.
- Select Biog., L, 1-61
- Edinburgh Christian Instructor, xxii.
- Glasgow Testates.
- Edin. Reg. (Bapt.)
- Young's Life of Welsh
- Calderwood's History, v., 420, 621, 685, et passim
- National Records of Scotland Register of Deeds, cccclxiii., 282
- Dictionary of National Biography
- Notes and Queries, 9th ser., iv., 433
- Craig-Brown's Selkirkshire, ii., 220
- M'Crie s Knox, App., p. 417.

== See also ==
- Rev John Munro of Tain
