= John Durie =

Scottish minister

Personal details
- Born: 1537
- Died: 29 February 1600 (aged 62–63)

Minister of Colinton
- In office 1569 – May 1570

Minister of Leith
- In office May 1570 – 1574

Minister of St Giles' Cathedral
- In office before 6 August 1573 – November 1583

Minister of Montrose
- In office 1585 – 29 February 1600

John Durie (1537–1600) was one of the first Presbyterian ministers in Edinburgh after the Reformation in Scotland.

He was born at Mauchline in Ayrshire in 1537, and educated at Ayr. He became one of the Benedictine monks of Dunfermline, but being suspected of heresy was ordered to be shut up until death. At the time of the Reformation, through the influence of the Earl of Arran, he made his escape. He was extremely devoted to John Knox, and a most ardent supporter of his views. Becoming a minister of Edinburgh about 1573, he was conspicuous in the conflicts between the church and the king, and in many ways suffered for his outspokenness. In 1575, he expressed himself strongly in the general assembly against prelacy, and was supported by Andrew Melville. For inveighing against the court Durie and Walter Balcanquhal were imprisoned in the castle of Edinburgh until they produced in writing the passage objected to. For reflecting on the Duke of Lennox and others in a sermon preached 23 May 1582, he was called before the privy council and ordered to leave Edinburgh. Soon, however, he got leave to return, and on his arrival at Leith on 4 September the people of Edinburgh met him at the Gallow Green and marched with him up to Edinburgh and along the High Street singing the 124th psalm in four parts, showing not only their attachment to their minister but their skill in psalmody. In November, however, he was again banished from Edinburgh, but allowed to exercise his ministry at Montrose. His death took place on the last night of February 1600, amid great serenity of mind.

== Life ==
Durie was in born in Mauchline on 1537. He educated at Ayr Through the influence of his cousin George Durie, Abbot of Dunfermline, became a conventual brother in that abbey, but falling under suspicion of heresy, was condemned to be shut up until he died. On the Reformation taking place, he escaped through the influence of James, Earl of Arran, and became exhorter at Penicuik or Restalrig. between 1563 and 1567. Durie was minister at Hailes (Colinton) in 1569. He translated, to South Leith Parish Church in May 1570 and subsequently translated, to St Giles, before 6 August 1573. He was admitted to Montrose in 1585.

In 1580, Durie was visitor or superintendent of Teviotdale. With his colleagues, James Lawson and Walter Balcanquhal, he attended the Earl of Morton at his execution, 1581. He became conspicuous in the conflicts between the King and the Church, and for inveighing against the court on a Fast Day, on 23 May 1582, he was called before the Privy Council and ordered to quit Edinburgh and desist from preaching. By and by he was permitted to return, when he was met and welcomed by a great concourse of people, 4 September 1582. "At the Nether Bow they took up the 124th Psalm, 'Now Israel may say, and that truly,' and sang it in such a pleasant tune, in all the four parts, these being well known to the people, who came up the street bareheaded and singing, till they entered the kirk. This had such a sound and majesty as affected themselves and the huge multitude of beholders who looked over the shots and forestairs with admiration and amazement. The Duke [Lennox] himself was a witness, and tare his beard for anger, being more affrayed at this sight than anything he had ever seen since he came to Scotland. When they entered the kirk Mr Lawson made a short exhortation in the reader's place to thankfulness, and after the singing of a psalm the people departed with great joy" (Calderwood's History, iii.). In November 1583, he was again charged to leave the city, and was confined to Montrose, of which parish he became minister the year following.

== Wider church responsibilities ==
Durie was appointed as part of a committee to redraft the Book of Discipline in October 1576. In 1580, he was made a visitor to Teviotdale. He was a member of the General Assembly of the Church of Scotland of 1586, 1587, 1588, 1590, 1593, and 1595. He had a pension of £140 granted to him out of the lands of Altyre, on 7 August 1590, for his services in advancing the public affairs of the Church for many years.

== Legacy ==
James Melville, who was his son-in-law, says of him that though he had not much learning, he was a man of singular force of character, mighty in word and deed. Preaching and athletics went together, for ‘the gown was no sooner off and the Bible out of hand in the kirk, when on went the corselet and up fangit [snatched up] was the hagbut, and to the fields.’ But he speaks of him as a man of singular devoutness, who prayed and communed with God in so remarkable a manner that he counted it one of the privileges of his life that he had come in contact with him.

In many ways he bore a great resemblance to his master, John Knox. Andrew Melville composed no fewer than eight Latin epitaphs in his honour, chiefly celebrating the courage with which he resisted the court.

Duræus, ore tonans, Edenâ pastor in urbe, Arcuit a stabulis quos dedit aula lupos. Celurcâ in cælum migravit nunc, quia non quit Arcere a stabulis quos dedit aula lupos.

(‘Celurca’ is the Latin for Montrose).

== Family ==
Durie married Marion, daughter of Sir John Majoribanks, provost of Edinburgh, and had her husband's pension continued to her by act of parliament 11 July 1606. They had issue —

- Joshua, minister of Inverkeilor
- Robert Durie, minister of Anstruther
- Simeon, minister of Arbroath
- Christian (married George Gledstanes, Archbishop of St Andrews)
- Elizabeth (married James Melvill, minister of Kilrenny)
- a daughter (married John Dykes, minister of Kilrenny)

== Bibliography ==
- Melville's Diary
- Calderwood's Hist.
- Knox's Life of Melville
- Reg. Assig.
- Melvill's Autob.,
- Wodrow Miscell.
- Wodrow's Biog. (i.) and MS. Biog. (i.)
- Petrie's, Spottiswood's, and Row's Histories
- Edin. Counc. Reg.
- Edinburgh Christian Instructor, v.
- Acts of Pari., iii. 551, iv. 311
- Edin. Tests.
