= John Sharp (minister) =

Scottish church leader (1572–1647)

- Professor of Divinity
- Successor: Alexander Colvill
- Previous post: parish minister of Kilmany

Personal details
- Born: 1572 Edinburgh
- Died: 1647 (aged 74–75) probably Edinburgh
- Denomination: Church of Scotland
- Spouse: Agnes Davidson
- Children: (1) Marie (2) John
- Education: University of St. Andrews

John Sharp was a theologian and Church of Scotland minister. He achieved notoriety for his presbyterian principles which brought him into conflict with James VI who wished to impose an episcopalian system. Sharp graduated with an M.A. from St Andrews in 1592. He was admitted to Kilmany in 1601. He was one of those who, in opposition to the Royal command, attended the General Assembly of Aberdeen. For this he and five other ministers were committed to the Castle of Blackness on 2 August. He was brought before the Privy Council at Perth on 27 August and interrogated as to the constitution of the Assembly. Not giving satisfactory answers they were tried before the Justiciary Court at Linlithgow on 10 January 1606, on a charge of treason, found guilty, and banished for life. On 23 October Sharp went to Bordeaux and became Professor of Theology in the University of Die, but would probably have returned to Scotland had honourable terms of reconciliation been offered him. In 1630 he was compelled to leave France at the instance of Cardinal Richelieu, the Prime Minister, who had grown jealous of Sharp's reputation as a Protestant teacher. Sharp was appointed Professor of Divinity in the University of Edinburgh on 17 November 1630. He died about 1647, aged 75.

== Life ==
John Sharp, Scottish theologian, was born in Edinburgh 1572. He studied at the University of St. Andrews, and received the degree of M.A. in 1592. His first theological work was published in 1600. In 1601 he became minister of Kilmany in Fife, a parish in the gift of St. Salvator's College, St. Andrews. He was appointed clerk to the assembly which met at Aberdeen on 2 July 1605 in opposition to the commands of James VI, who was taking decisive steps to repress the independence of the Scottish church (Scottish P. C. Reg. 1604–7, p. 472). In consequence Sharp and those present at the assembly were ordered to appear before the privy council on 24 October. When they presented themselves they declared the authority of the privy council incompetent to judge a purely ecclesiastical question. For this conduct Sharp and five other ministers were confined in Blackness Castle and served with an indictment to stand their trial for high treason before the court of justiciary at Linlithgow. There they were found guilty in January 1606, and on 23 October banished for life (ib. pp. 83–5, 101–5, 112, 123–5, 134, 199) Sharp went to France, where in 1608 he was appointed professor of theology in the college of Die in Dauphiné. In 1618 Archbishop Spotiswood asserted that Sharp had written to him beseeching him to obtain his recall and promising submission. This statement was vehemently denied by Sharp's friends, and the letter itself was never produced. There is no doubt, however, that he would have welcomed a reconciliation on honourable terms, and he dedicated his ‘Cursus Theologicus’ to King James in the same year. In 1630 Cardinal Richelieu ordered him to leave France, where he had acquired considerable renown as a protestant theologian, and he came over to London, taking advantage of King Charles' change of policy. In the same year he became professor of divinity in the University of Edinburgh, and died about 1647, when Alexander Colvill succeeded him.

== Family ==
He married Agnes Davidson, and had issue —

- Marie, baptised 18 August 1640;
- John, baptised 8 August 1641.

== Works ==
He published:

- ‘Tractatus de Justificatione hominis coram Deo,’ Geneva, 1609 and 1612, 8vo.
- ‘Tractatus de misero hominis statu sub peccato,’ Geneva, 1610, 8vo.
- ‘Cursus Theologicus,’ Geneva, 1618, 4to; Geneva, 1622, 4to.
- ‘Symphonia Prophetarum et Apostolorum,’ Geneva, 1625 and 1639, 4to.

== Bibliography ==
- M'Crie's Life of Melville, 1st ed. ii. 253
- Young's Life of Welsh, p. 169
- Pitcairn's Criminal Trials, ii. 494.
- Melvill's Autobiography, 571 et seq.
- Calderwood's Hist., vi., 292, 332
- Pitcairn's Criminal Trials, ii., 494
- Young's Life of Welsh, 169
- M'Crie's Melville, ii., 253
- P. G. Reg., vii., 83 et seq.
- Murray's Some Old Scots Authors whose Books were Printed Abroad, 20
