= Josias Welsh =

Scottish minister in Templepatrick

Personal details
- Born: Josias Welsh also spelled Welch
- Died: 23 June 1634
- Buried: Carmavy Cemetery, 30 Carmavy Road, Nutt's Corner, Antrim
- Education: University of Glasgow

Josias Welsh (d. 23 June 1634, Templepatrick, County Antrim) was one of the early Scots ministers who settled in Ulster in the 17th century. A supporter of the Scottish Reformation, he refused to follow the episcopal church of the king of England, and preached as a Covenanter. He was deposed for his adherence to Presbyterian principles.

He was part of a family of Presbyterian preachers, being the grandson of John Knox, the son of John Welsh of Ayr, and the father of John Welsh of Irongray.

He was a professor at the University of Glasgow, and then preached in Oldstone, County Antrim; after James Glendinning’s retirement, Welsh preached at Templepatrick until his death.

== Life ==
Josias Welsh, second son of John Welsh and Elizabeth Knox, was educated in Geneva, and in 1617 was sent from France to Glasgow to complete his studies under the care of his father's friend, Robert Boyd of Trochrig, principal of a college. His superiority as a classical scholar led to his appointment as Professor of Humanity in the University. However, he was an ardent believer in the Presbyterian policy, and as such he became obnoxious to the episcopal party, and so was compelled to relinquish his post at the university.

He was ordained by his grandfather John Knox, circa 1625. On the recommendation of Robert Blair, then a regent of Glasgow College, he proceeded to the north of Ireland, where a colony from the west of Scotland had been planted. Residing with Mr. Shaw, a gentleman from Ayrshire, who had probably known his father, he preached in his neighbourhood, on the opposite side of the Six-Mile Water. As such, he was heavily involved in the Six Mile Water revival.

For a time he officiated at Oldstone, and having been ordained by Andrew Knox, Bishop of Raphoe, who is said to have regarded him as a relative, in 1626 he settled at Templepatrick, County Antrim, as chaplain to Captain Norton. Here he laboured with much zeal and acceptance. According to Wodrow he was popularly styled the 'Cock of the Conscience', from the earnest and searching nature of his ministrations. His Communion services excited a deep interest over a wide tract of country.

With three other ministers he was, in 1631, suspended from his post by Henry Leslie, Bishop of Down and Bishop Echlin; the suspension was afterwards withdrawn, but he and his brethren were again deposed by Bishop Echlin in May 1632. From then on he preached in his own house, addressing a numerous body of persons who assembled in his garden, until the second suspension was lifted in May 1634. Through exposure he contracted a severe illness, which proved fatal. During his last hours he was attended by his brethren, Robert Blair and John Livingstone. He died on 23 June 1634. Among his last words were these, expressed rapturously, "Victory, victory for evermore." Within an enclosure in Templepatrick churchyard, a plain tombstone marks his grave.

The gravestone presents the simple legend:
Here lyeth the Body
of the Reverend Mr Josias
Welch, minister of
Templepatrick, who
died Anno Dom. 1634.

Stephenson gives another epitaph:

"Here lies interred under this stone,
Great Knoxes grand child, John Welshes son;
Born in Scotland, and bred up in France,
He then came to Ireland the gospel to advance."

== Family ==
Josias Welsh, minister of Templepatrick, married subsequent to his settlement in Ireland, but his wife's name and the date of his marriage have not transpired. As his wife is not mentioned at the time of his death, it is probable she died before him. Appended to a declaration for settling the Province of Ulster, dated Carrickfergus, 23 May 1653, are the names of 260 persons, in the counties of Down and Antrim, whom Cromwell's commissioners proposed to remove to certain districts in Munster. Among these is named in the "Six-Mile Water" quarters, "Captain George Welsh." The Six-Mile Water district included the parish of Templepatrick, and those enumerated in "the Declaration" were persons obnoxious to Cromwell on account of their adhesion to monarchical and Presbyterian principles. From these considerations it is not improbable that Captain Welsh was a son of the minister of Templepatrick.

So far as is known, there was in Ulster no other family of the name. The "Declaration" of Cromwell's commissioners not having been acted upon, Captain George Welsh remained in Ulster, but his name does not reappear. However, several local preachers claimed descent from Welsh, including Rev Andrew Walsh of Ardstraw, Rev Dr Rogers of Londonderry, the family of Rev Moses Nelson in Rademon, the Booth family of Omagh and the Rogers of Ballyhatty.

John Welsh, minister of Kirkpatrick-Irongray, in the county of Dumfries, is known to have been a son of Josias Welsh, and a great-grandson of John Knox and Margaret Knox.

== Character ==
Welsh was minister at Templepatrick in the north of Ireland, commonly called the Cock of the Conscience by the people of the country, because of his extraordinary wakening and rousing gift. He was one of that society of ministers which wrought that unparalleled work in the north of Ireland about the year 1636; but was himself a man most sadly exercised with doubts about his own salvation all his time, and would ordinarily say, that minister was much to be pitied who was called to comfort weak saints and had no comfort himself.

He was the author of a short catechism.
