= John Forbes (Alford minister) =

Scottish church leader (c1560–1618)

Personal details
- Born: c.1568
- Died: 1634 Delft
- Denomination: Church of Scotland

John Forbes (c.1568–1634) was a Scottish minister exiled by James VI and I. He founded a Church of Scotland in Middelburg in the Netherlands. He was born about 1568, and was third son of William Forbes of Corse and Elizabeth, daughter of Alexander Strachan of Thornton. He graduated M.A. at St Andrews in 1583, and was settled in Alford in 1593. In November 1602 the General Assembly chose him as one of those whom the King might select for nominating commissioners from the various Presbyteries to Parliament. At Alford he came into conflict with the powerful sept of the Gordons, who were vigorous opponents of Protestantism, and when the Synods of Aberdeen and Moray excommunicated the Marquess of Huntly, and Huntly had appealed successfully to the Privy Council, Forbes was sent by these Synods to London to represent the case to King James. He was elected Moderator of the General Assembly of Aberdeen on 2 July 1605 contrary to the King's order. Of twelve Aberdeenshire ministers who were present ten afterwards admitted the illegal nature of the Assembly, but Forbes [and Charles Fearn, minister of Fraserburgh] having been summoned before the Privy Council, declined the Council's jurisdiction, on the ground that the Assembly had dealt wholly with spiritual matters. For this he was imprisoned at Blackness, tried for high treason, and banished the country. On 7 November 1606 he sailed from Leith for Bordeaux, and after spending a time with Boyd of Trochrig at Saumur, he proceeded to Sedan. Much of his work thereafter consisted in visiting the Reformed Churches and Universities on the Continent, in which were many Scots students and professors. In 1611 he became minister of the English congregation at Middelburg, Holland, and soon after he was offered release from his sentence, but upon conditions he could not accept. In 1616 he came to London, where he had an interview with the King, who promised to annul his banishment — a promise which was not fulfilled. In 1621 he was minister at Delft, but the hatred of his former ministerial brethren, some of whom were now bishops, instigated Laud and the English Government to procure his dismissal, and this was carried out in 1628. He died in Holland in 1634.

== Life ==
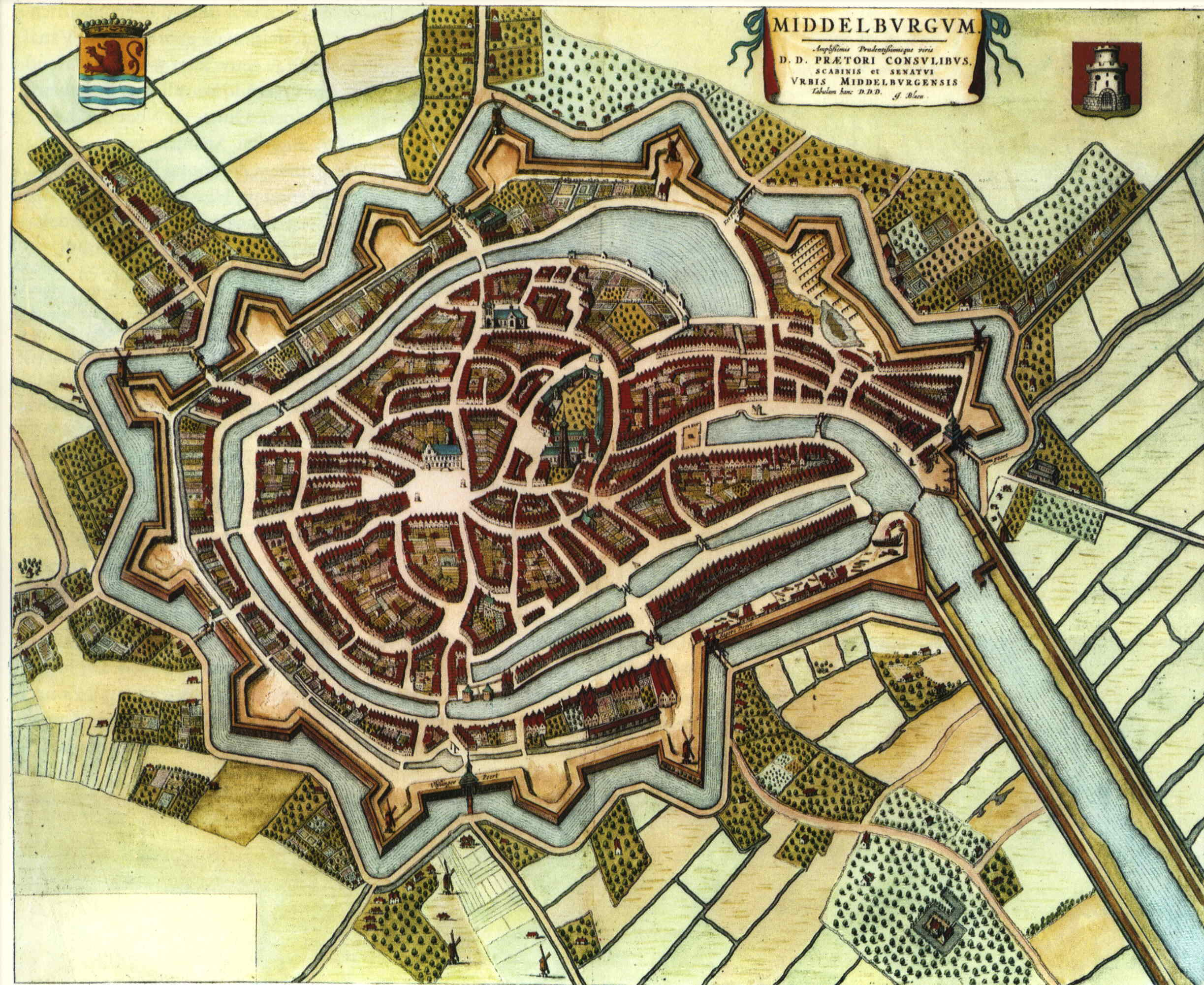
Middelburg in 1652. Forbes founded an English speaking church here.

John Forbes was born around 1568, probably at his father's main residence, Corse Castle, and was educated at the University of St. Andrews, where he earned the degree of M.A. in 1583, and was ordained minister of Alford, Aberdeenshire in 1593. When the proceedings of the synods of Aberdeen and Moray against George Gordon, 1st Marquess of Huntly were interfered with by the privy council, he was sent by them to London to seek redress from the king, James I. He went to court in March 1605, was graciously received by the king, and succeeded in the object of his mission.

In July 1605 he was appointed moderator of the Aberdeen assembly, which was held contrary to the king's orders; and when he and others were summoned before the privy council to answer for their disobedience, they declined its jurisdiction, as the matter was spiritual, and offered to submit their conduct to the judgment of the church. For this Forbes and five others were imprisoned in Blackness Castle (the so-called "warded minsters", who included also John Welsh of Ayr, and other participants in the assembly, namely Andrew Duncan, Robert Dury, John Sharp, and Alexander Strachan.). They were tried for high treason, found guilty by a packed jury, and banished from the king's dominions for life.

The exiles sailed from Leith for Bordeaux on 7 November 1606. On reaching France Forbes visited James Boyd of Trochrig at Saumur Academy, and then went to the Academy of Sedan. For some years he travelled, visiting the reformed churches and universities. In 1611 he was settled as pastor of a British congregation at Middelburg. He was offered release from banishment on conditions which he could not accept. In 1616 he was in London for several months, and saw the king, who promised to revoke his sentence of exile, but the promise was not fulfilled.

After a ministry of ten years at Middelburg, he became pastor of the British church at Delft. In 1628 Charles I of England, influenced by William Laud, began to interfere with the worship and discipline of the English and Scottish churches in the Netherlands, and Forbes was ultimately removed from his charge. He died in 1634, aged about sixty-six.

== Works ==
He was the author of:

- The Saint's Hope, and infallibleness thereof, Middelburg, 1608.
- Two sermons, Middelburg, 1608.
- A Treatise tending to the clearing of Justification, Middelburg, 1616.
- A Treatise how God's Spirit may be discerned from Man's own Spirit, London, 1617.
- Four sermons on 1 Tim. vi. 13-16, 1635.
- A sermon on 2 Tim. ii. 4, Delft, 1642.
- Certain Records touching the Estate of the Kirk in 1605 and 1606, Edinburgh, Wodrow Society, 1846.

== Family ==
He was the third son of William Forbes of Corse, Aberdeenshire. an early adherent of the Protestant Reformation, and Elizabeth, daughter of Alexander Strachan of Thornton. Patrick Forbes, the eldest son, became bishop of Aberdeen, William, the second, founded the family of Craigievar, and Arthur, the fourth, that of the Earls of Granard in Ireland. He was held in much honour by the Reformed Churches abroad for his consistently faithful character, his eminent talents and learning, and, above all, for his sufferings in the cause of religion.

He married Christian, daughter of Barclay of Mathers. Two of his sons were colonels in the Dutch service, one of whom afterwards fought on the side of the covenanters.

He married Christian, daughter of George Barclay of Mathers, and had issue —

- John, colonel in the Dutch Service;
- Arthur, colonel in the Dutch Service;
- Patrick, Bishop of Caithness;
- James, minister of Abercorn;
- Margaret (married Andrew Skene in Kirktown of Dyce);
- a daughter (married William, son of Alexander Forbes, Bishop of Aberdeen);
- Katherine (married John Oswald, minister of Prestonpans).

== Bibliography ==
- Lumsden's House of Forbes
- Melville's Autob.
- Pitcairn's Crim. Trials, ii.
- Aberdeen Journal Notes and Queries, vi., 164, 168
- Family of Skene, 30
- Martin's Eminent Divines in Aberdeen and the North, 113
- Life, by David Laing (prefixed to Certain Records)
- Aberdeen Sas. Sec. Rec, i., 170.
