= George Crichton, 1st Earl of Caithness =

Scottish peer

George Crichton, 1st Earl of Caithness (ca. 1409 – August 1454/1455), was a Scottish peer.

Succeeding his father as sheriff of Linlithgowshire, he was knighted before 1438. In 1441 he was ambassador to the Brittany to negotiate the marriage of James II's sister Isabella. He later served as Lord High Admiral of Scotland, sheriff of Stirling, and Keeper of Stirling Castle.

== Life ==
The elder son of Stephen Crichton of Cairns, Edinburghshire, who died in 1434, Crichton built up an estate mostly in south-west Scotland and Lothian. He was sometimes called "of Blackness", in Linlithgowshire, which became his principal estate, and sometimes "of Cairns".

Crichton married firstly, about 1425, a daughter of Sir William Douglas of Strathbrock, by whom he had a son, James. About 1450, he married secondly Janet, a daughter of Sir William Borthwick of that Ilk, who was the widow of Sir James Douglas of Dalkeith and also of Sir Colin Campbell of Glenorchy. In 1454 their daughter Janet married Robert Maxwell, 2nd Lord Maxwell (who died c. 1485).

He succeeded his father as sheriff of Linlithgowshire and was knighted before 1438. In 1441 he was sent as an ambassador to the Duchy of Brittany, to negotiate the marriage of James II's sister Isabella. He witnessed some crown charters during his cousin William Crichton's first term of office as Lord Chancellor of Scotland, and was appointed as Lord High Admiral of Scotland in 1448.

Following the fall of the Livingstons, Crichton was appointed as sheriff of Stirling and as Keeper of Stirling Castle. By the end of 1452 he was also Justiciar south of the Forth. In June 1452 he was created Earl of Caithness. He then began to entail his property to prevent his son, James Crichton, from succeeding to his estates and title. In retaliation, James imprisoned his father in Blackness Castle, but he was rescued by the King. A compromise settlement was agreed, under which James would inherit the ancestral estate of Cairns and also received from the Scottish crown some land in Perthshire. The rest of Crichton's property, as well as his Earldom, were to go to the crown when he died, which he did in August 1454.

== Sources ==
- 1
