= Kilmany =

Coordinates: 56.384748°N 2.994556°W

Kilmany: Scottish Gaelic: Cille Mheinidh
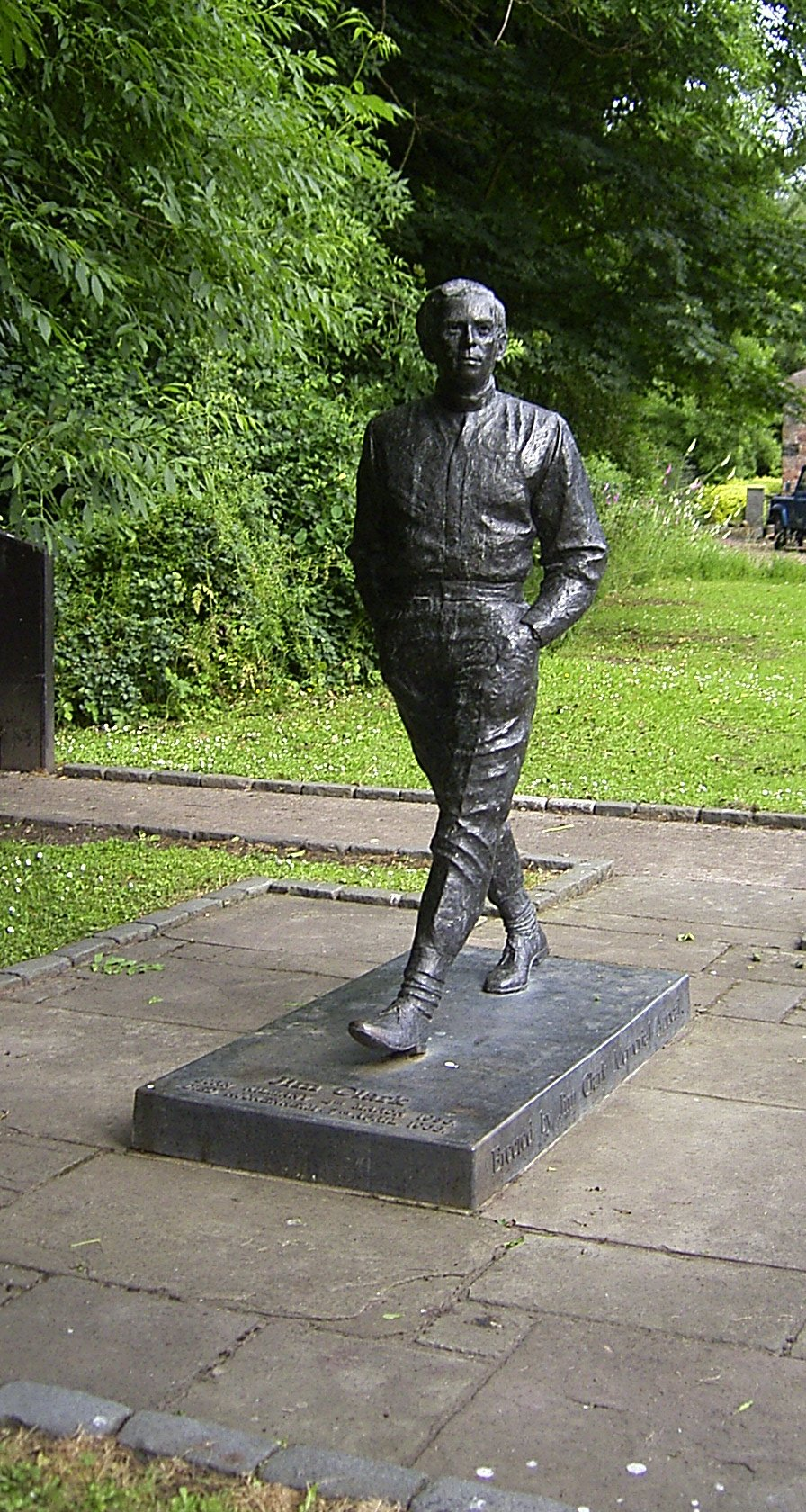
- Jim Clark memorial sculpture in Kilmany

- Location within Fife
- Population: 75 (2001)
- Council area: Fife
- Lieutenancy area: Fife
- Country: Scotland
- Sovereign state: United Kingdom
- Police: Scotland
- Fire: Scottish
- Ambulance: Scottish

Kilmany (Scottish Gaelic: Cille Mheinidh) is a village and parish in Fife, Scotland. It is located on the A92 between Auchtermuchty and the Tay Road Bridge. In 2001 it had a population of 75.

The current name of the village derives from an older Scottish Gaelic name, but the meaning of that name is somewhat obscure. The first element, 'Kil', is from the Gaelic cill meaning a chapel or a monk's cell. The last element was -in, an old Gaelic suffix meaning 'the place of'. The middle element was an early saint's name, but which saint is not clear. St Maine, St Manna, and St Mannán have all been suggested. Taken together, the old Gaelic name would have meant 'The Site of the Church of Maine, Manna, or Mannán'.

It is notable for being the birthplace of Jim Clark, former world champion Formula One racing-car driver. There is a statue of Clark in the village, unveiled in 1997 by Sir Jackie Stewart.

It was also the home of William Anstruther-Gray, Baron Kilmany who served as Chairman of Ways and Means in the House of Commons from 1962 to 1964 and later sat in the House of Lords after being made a life peer in 1966.

Between 1909 and 1960, Kilmany had its own railway station on the Newburgh and North Fife Railway.

The civil parish had a population of 218 in 2011.

== Notable people ==
- John Sharp (1572–1647), exiled Scottish minister and Professor of Divinity
- David Hackston (d. 1680)
- Rev John Cook (1770–1824), minister of the parish 1793 to 1802
- Thomas Chalmers, minister of the parish 1803 to 1815
- Jim Clark (1936–1968), two-time Formula One racing champion
