= Blackness Castle =

Fortress, near the village of Blackness, Scotland

- Blackness, Falkirk, Scotland; NT055802
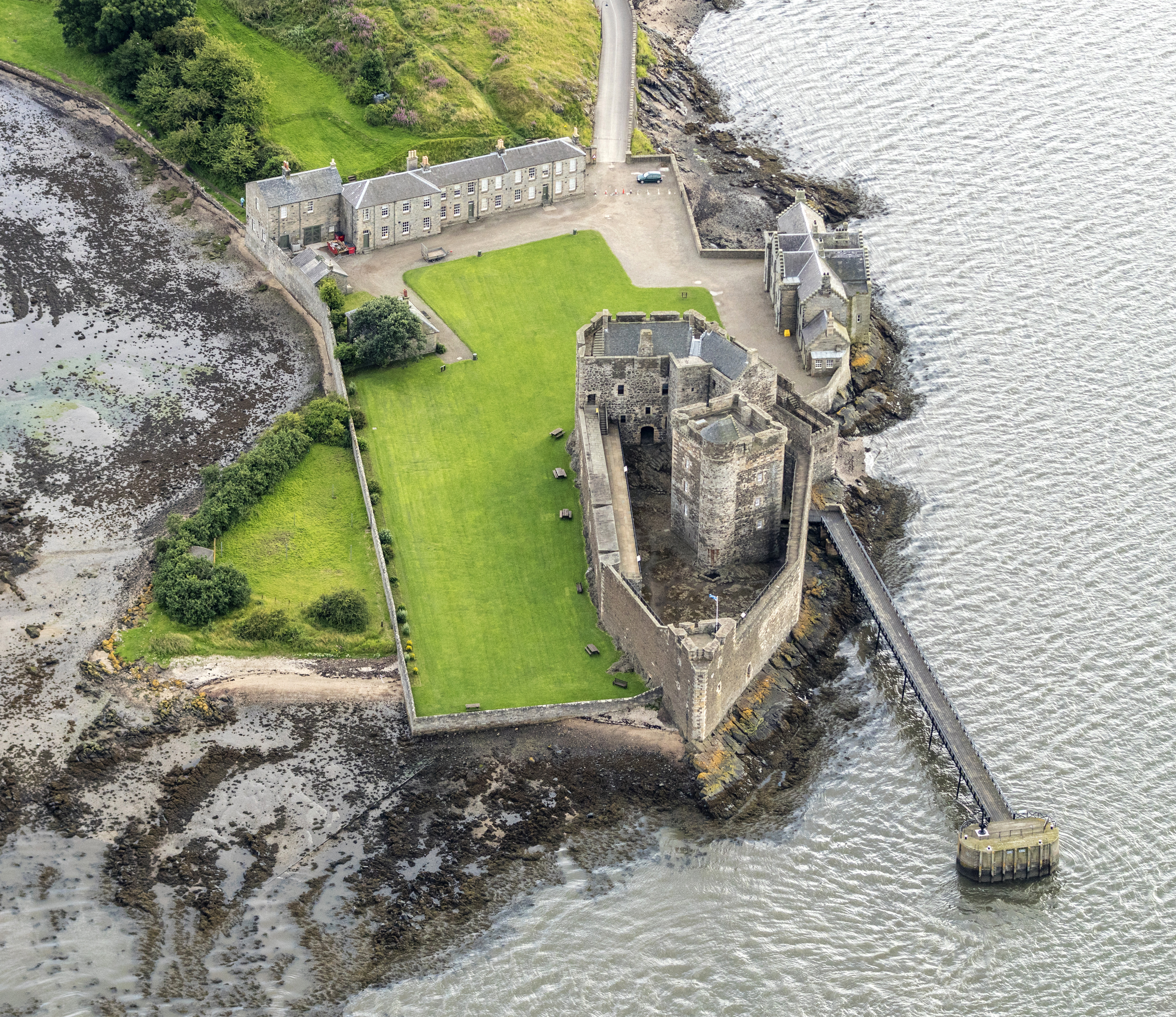
- Aerial photo of Blackness Castle

Site information
- Type: Curtain wall, artillery fortification
- Owner: Historic Environment Scotland
- Open to the public: Yes
- Condition: Restored

Location
- Coordinates: 56°00′22″N 03°30′58″W

Site history
- Built: 1440s
- Built by: Sir George Crichton
- In use: Until 1912
- Materials: Stone

Blackness Castle is a 15th-century fortress, near the village of Blackness, Scotland, on the south shore of the Firth of Forth.

It was built, probably on the site of an earlier fort, by Sir George Crichton in the 1440s. At this time, Blackness was the main port serving the Royal Burgh of Linlithgow, one of the main residences of the Scottish monarch. The castle, together with the Crichton lands, passed to James II of Scotland in 1453, and the castle has been crown property ever since. It served as a state prison, holding such prisoners as Cardinal Beaton and the 6th Earl of Angus.

Strengthened by Sir James Hamilton of Finnart in the mid-16th century, the castle became one of the most advanced artillery fortifications of its time in Scotland. A century later, these defences were not enough to prevent Blackness falling to Oliver Cromwell's army in 1650. Some years after the siege, the castle was repaired, and again served as a prison and a minor garrison. In 1693, the spur protecting the gate was heightened, and the Stern Tower shortened as a base for three heavy guns. Barracks and officers' quarters were added in the 1870s, when the castle was used as an ammunition depot, until 1912. The castle was briefly reused by the army during World War I. It is now a Scheduled Ancient Monument, in the care of Historic Environment Scotland.

Because of its site, jutting into the Forth, and its long, narrow shape, the castle has been characterised as "the ship that never sailed". The north and south towers are often named "stem" and "stern", with the central tower called the "main mast".

== History ==
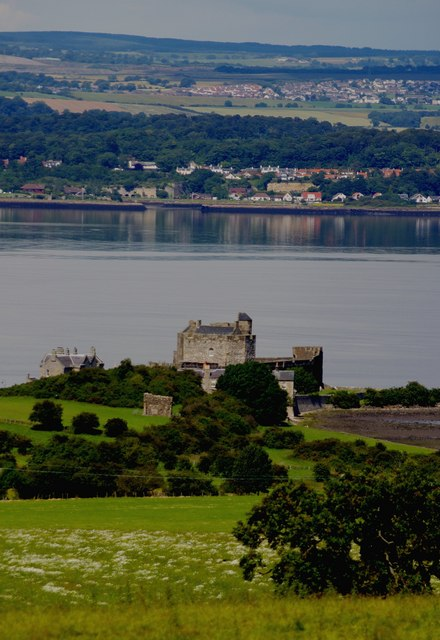
Blackness Castle as seen from the House of the Binns

=== Origins ===
The barony of Blackness was held in the mid-15th century by Sir George Crichton, Lord High Admiral of Scotland, Sheriff of Linlithgow, and later Earl of Caithness. The Crichtons were one of the most politically powerful Scottish families at the time, and were close to James II; George Crichton was governor of Stirling Castle when the King murdered the 8th Earl of Douglas there in 1452, and Crichton's cousin, William, was Chancellor of Scotland from 1439 to 1453. The castle was probably built in the mid-1440s, during a time of feuding between the Crichtons and the "Black" Douglases, which had resulted in the destruction of Crichton's tower at Barnton in Edinburgh in 1444.

Blackness Castle is first mentioned in 1449, and was already serving as a state prison as well as Crichton's residence. The original building comprised a curtain wall and the north tower, with the central tower isolated in the central courtyard. A hall range may have stood to the south, while the whole was defended by a rock-cut ditch and accessed by a gate in the east wall.

George Crichton handed over the Crichton lands, including Blackness Castle, to James II in 1453. His dispossessed heir, James Crichton, captured the castle and held it briefly against the King, who besieged and recaptured it the same year. Blackness became a royal fortress, as well as continuing to serve as a prison, and was put into the care of a keeper, who was often the Sheriff of Linlithgow.

James IV came to Blackness on 11 July 1506 after visiting the Isle of May sailing with the Lion and another ship. He was welcomed by four shawm players. In November 1512 the Great Michael and the Margaret were at Blackness. James IV came aboard the Michael on St Andrew's day to hold an audience with the French ambassador, Charles de Tocque, sieur de la Mothe. The Auld Alliance of Scotland and France was confirmed.

In the 17th century, the office of Keeper of Blackness became hereditary in the Livingstone family.

=== Fortification and destruction ===
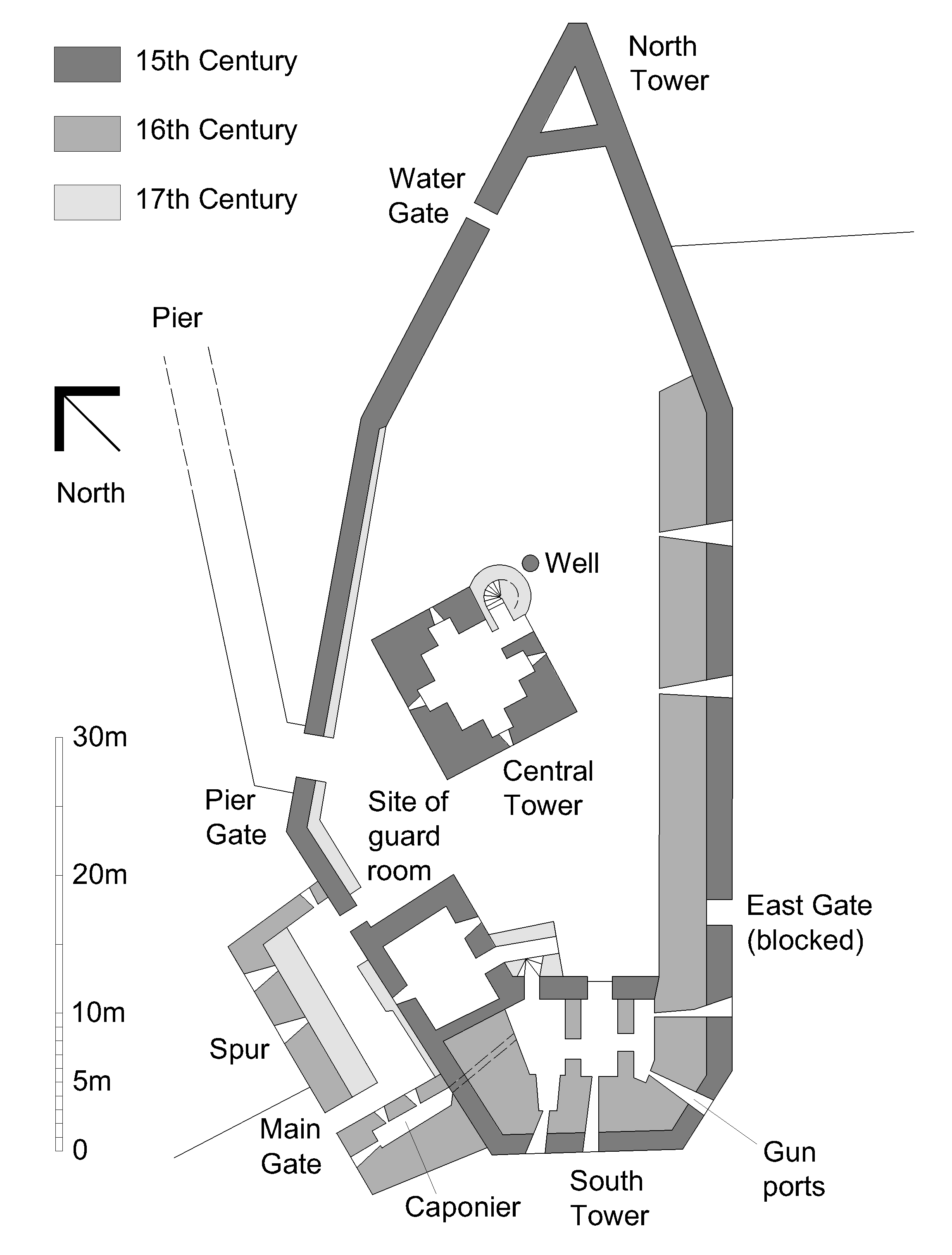
Plan of Blackness Castle

Between 1534 and 1540, a programme of fortification was carried out under the direction of the King's Master of Works, Sir James Hamilton of Finnart. Finnart, the illegitimate son of the Earl of Arran, was an expert in artillery fortification. Having spent time in Europe studying the subject, he designed his own castle at Craignethan in Lanarkshire as a showcase for his ideas. At Blackness, he introduced technological innovations including a complex entrance with a caponier, one of only three surviving in Scotland (the others being at Craignethan and Stirling Castle). The caponier, a passage within the external wall of the entrance, allowed defenders to fire into the entrance area, at the backs of any attackers who had breached the gate. The curtain wall was thickened on the inside to the south and east, from 1.5 m (5 ft) to over 5 m (16 ft) in places, and gun ports were opened up. The south wall was also heightened to enclose the new south tower.

Work continued after Finnart's execution for treason in 1540, under the superintendence of the parson of Dysart, and the "dungeon" and kitchen towers were roofed with turf called "brume and dovet". Major building works came to a halt in 1542 on the death of James V. Following the battle of Pinkie, on 15 September 1547 Richard Broke and the Galley Subtle rowed up the river to Blackness. After an exchange of fire he captured the Mary Willoughby, the Anthony of Newcastle and the Bosse, and burnt other ships. The Italian military engineer Camillo Marini (died 1552) was captain of Blackness in the last years of the war known as the Rough Wooing.

During the crisis of the Scottish Reformation the castle was surrendered by negotiation to James Hamilton, Duke of Châtellerault as leader of the Lords of the Congregation. Two English captains, Dethick and Wood, then took possession on Easter Day, 15 April 1560. Minor repairs were carried out to the castle during these years.

During the Marian civil war which followed the forced abdication of Mary, Queen of Scots in 1567, the garrison of Blackness remained loyal to her. However, the Keeper, Alexander Stewart, later changed sides to join the Regent Moray's party. In 1572, Lord Claud Hamilton recaptured the castle for Mary, harrying shipping in the Forth until the following year, despite being blockaded. On 27 January 1573, James Kirkcaldy, the brother of William Kirkcaldy of Grange who held Edinburgh Castle for Queen Mary, arrived at Blackness from France with arms and money for the Queen's side. His ship was captured the next day and Regent Morton laid siege. James Kirkcaldy and the castle surrendered within a week.

In 1580 Malcolm Douglas of the Mains delivered the castle to Lord Robert Stewart. Stewart complained that Douglas had removed the great iron "yett of the dungeon" the gate of the tower, and its lock and the prison-house lock, and timber platforms from the parapets, making it impossible to defend the castle. James Cochrane was the keeper for Sir James Sandilands, their prisoners included the Earl of Huntly in 1592, and John Wemyss of Logie in 1594.

The castle's defences were not tested again until 1650, when Oliver Cromwell's New Model Army besieged Blackness during his invasion of Scotland. However, by this time artillery technology had improved beyond anything that Finnart's defences could withstand, and the garrison soon surrendered under bombardment from land and sea. The damaged castle was abandoned.

=== Later years ===
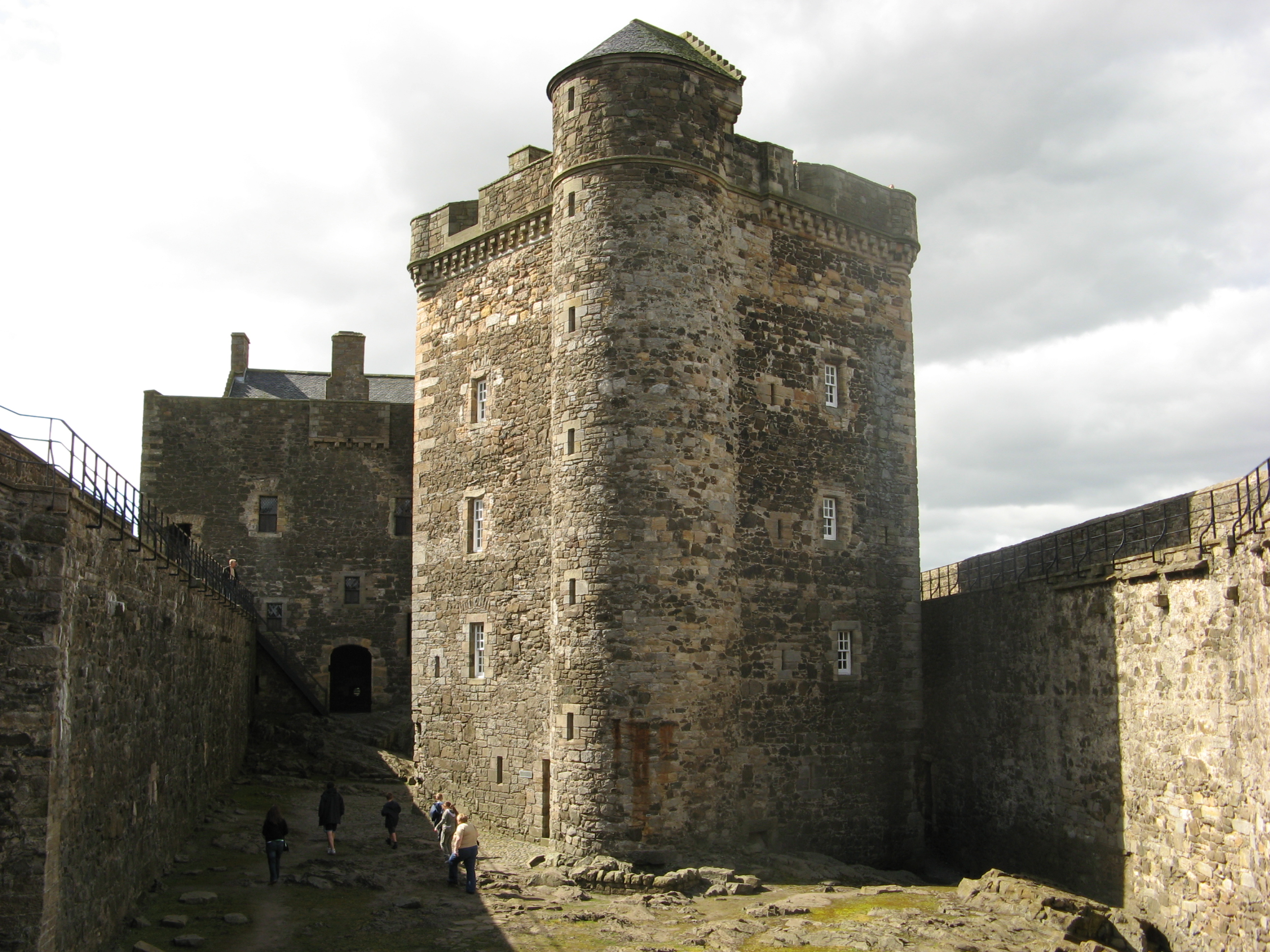
The courtyard and Central Tower seen from the north tower

The castle was not repaired until 1667, when it was again used as a prison, holding a number of Covenanters; religious rebels who opposed the King's interference in church affairs. The south tower was rearranged, with a bakehouse installed in the basement, and a new stair tower. Further changes were made in 1693, when the spur was heightened with a wall-walk, and the north tower was reduced to provide three gun platforms overlooking the Forth.

After the Union of Scotland and England in 1707, the castle ceased to be a prison, instead being one of four Scottish fortresses to be maintained and garrisoned by the British Army, the others being Stirling, Dumbarton and Edinburgh. The garrison at Blackness numbered around fifteen men in the late 18th century. Between 1759 and 1815 Blackness was again pressed into service as a prison, this time to hold French prisoners of war during the series of conflicts of the late 18th and early 19th centuries, including the Seven Years' War and the Napoleonic Wars.

In 1870, the role of Blackness changed again, and it became the central ammunition depot for Scotland. Numerous works were carried out, including the roofing-over of the entire courtyard, and the levelling of the ground to the east. The defensive ditch was filled in and barracks built to the south. The cast-iron pier was constructed in 1868, with a gate and a drawbridge, one of the last to be built in Britain. The depot closed in 1912, although it was briefly reoccupied during World War I, and the castle passed into the care of the Office of Works. A restoration programme was undertaken between 1926 and 1935, which entailed the removal of almost all the 19th-century works, and the rebuilding of medieval-style features, which may not fully reflect the original features of the castle.

== Description ==
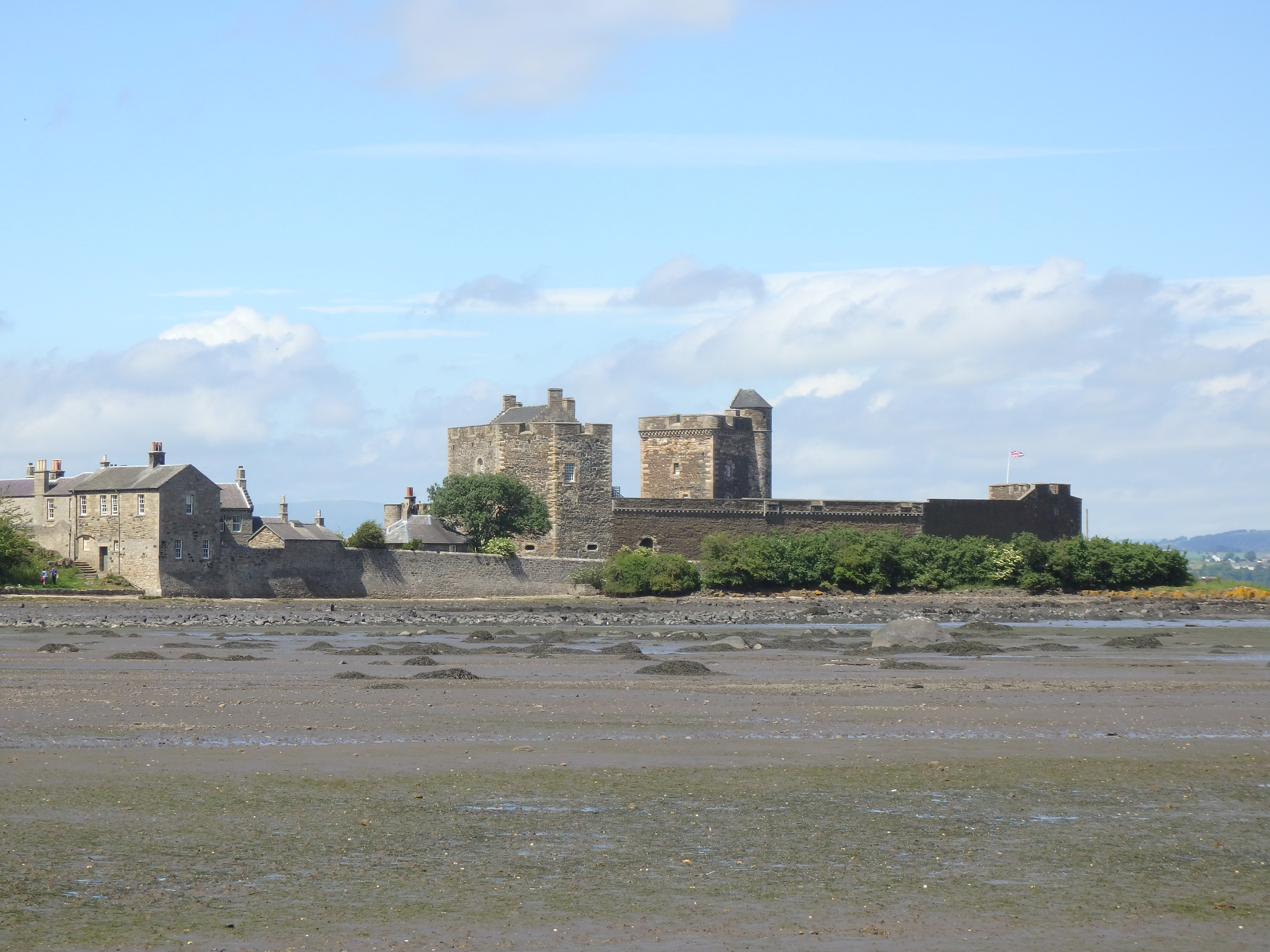
Blackness Castle from the east

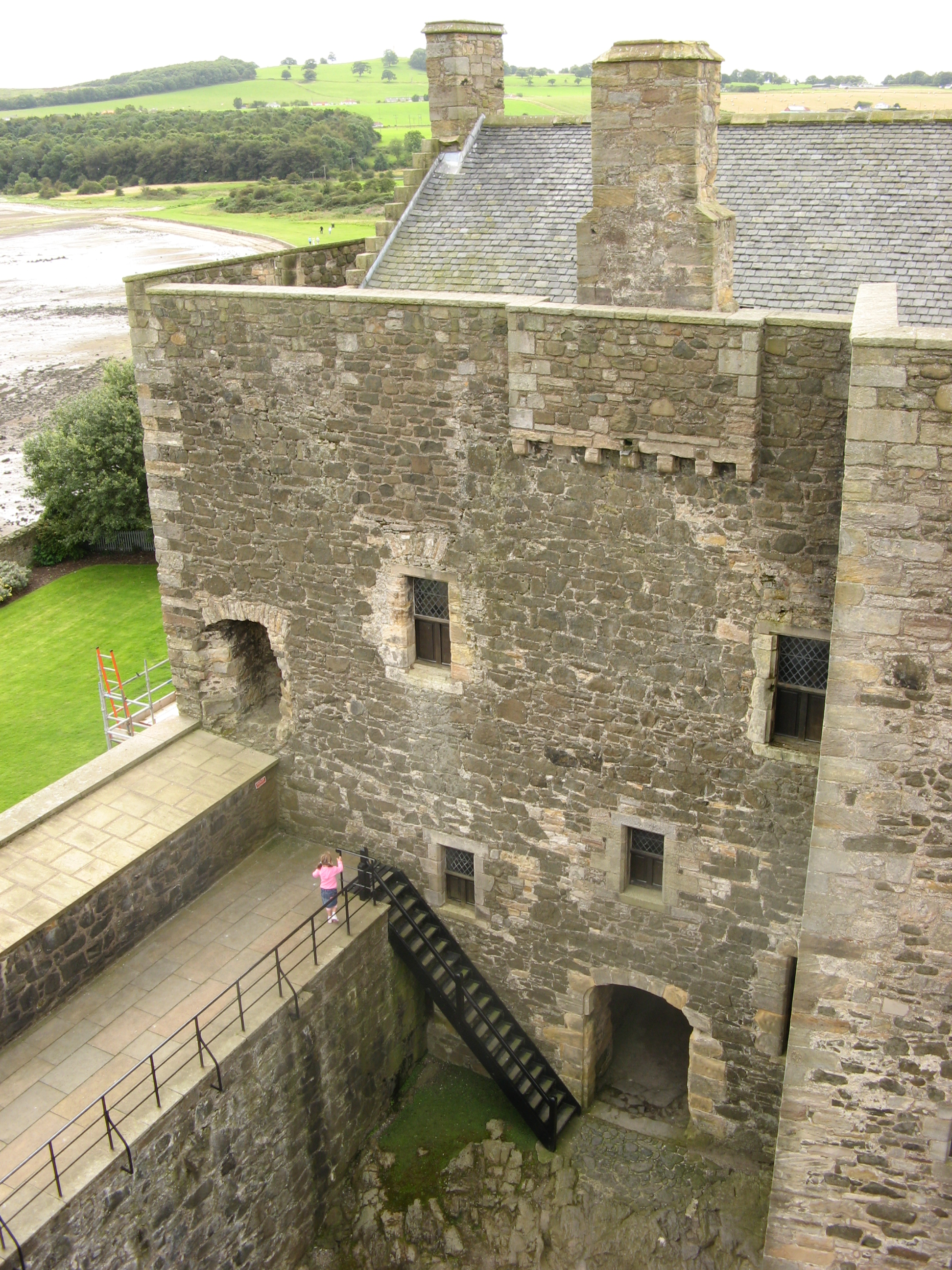
The South Tower, seen from the top of the Central Tower

The castle stands on a rocky spit in the Firth of Forth, and is oriented north–south. The castle comprises a curtain wall, with integrated north and south towers, and a separate central tower in the courtyard. To the south-west, a defensive spur forms the main entrance, while a water gate to the north-west gives access to the 19th-century pier. Outside the walls are 19th-century soldiers' barracks and officers' quarters. The castle is said in popular legend to have a ley tunnel linking it with the House of the Binns, which lies about two miles (three kilometres) south.

=== North and South Towers ===
Originally of three storeys, the small North, or Stem, Tower was reduced to two storeys in 1693. The upper chamber had a fireplace, while the lower chamber was a pit prison. Accessed only from a trap-door above, this chamber has a drain opening to the sea, which washes in at high tide.

The South, or Stern, Tower dates largely from the mid-16th century, possibly replacing an earlier hall block. On the south wall, the 16th-century stonework was added onto the battlements of the 15th-century curtain wall, leaving the pattern of alternating low and high sections "fossilised" in the wall. The tower is built over the thick-walled artillery positions in the basement, which defend the south and east approaches, and have similarities with the contemporary "blockhouse" at Dunbar Castle, further along the coast. The gunloops in the basement are up to 1.5 m (5 ft) across at the mouth. The South Tower provided the main accommodation in the castle, with chambers in the north-west wing, and a large hall on the upper storey. This hall was subdivided during the castle's time as an ammunition depot, although it has since been reinstated. In the 17th century, the large south-facing window was in use as a gun emplacement.

=== Central Tower ===
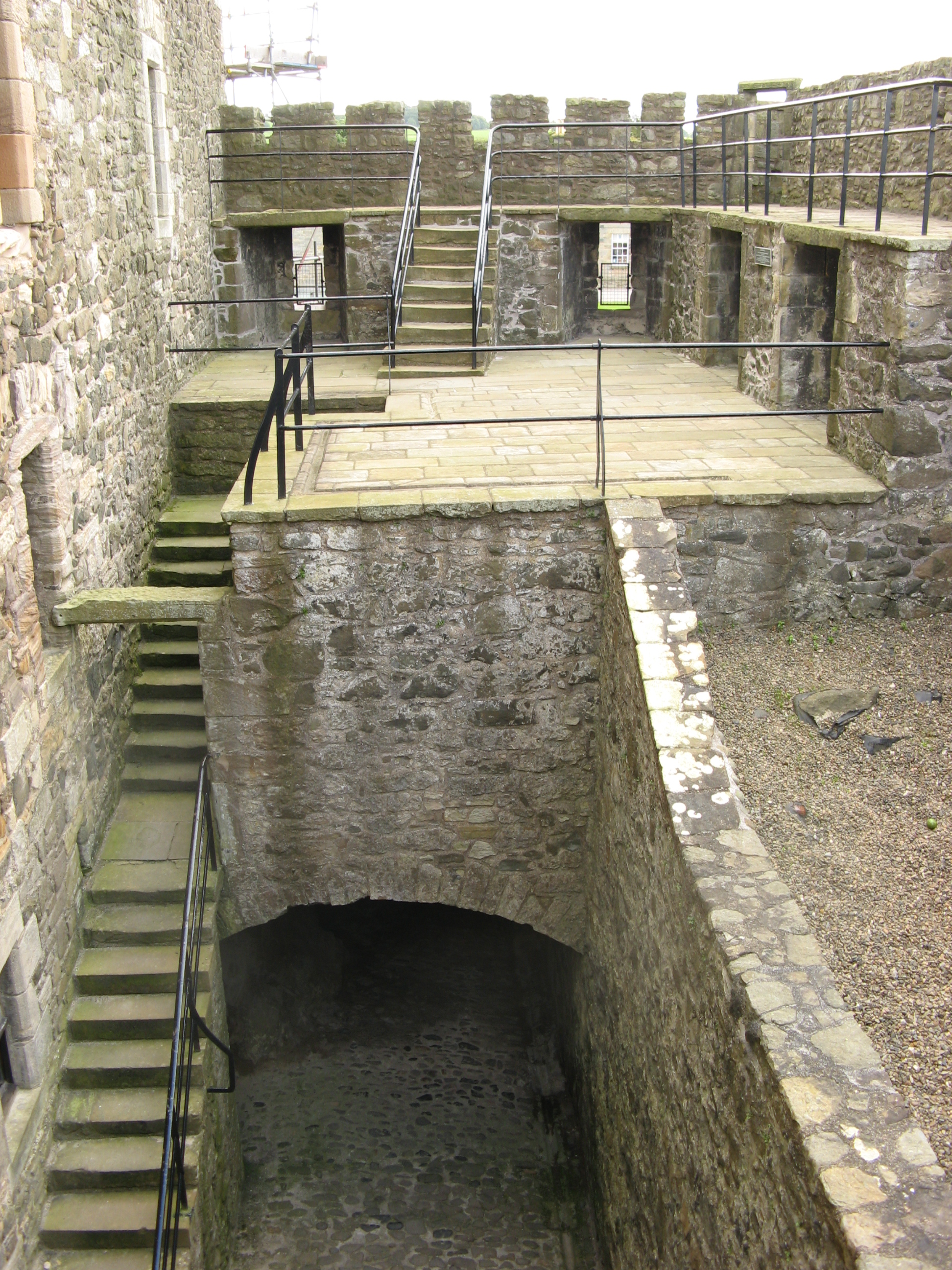
The interior of the Spur, showing the access passage leading from the main gate

The five-storey Central Tower, or "main mast", was built in the 15th century and heightened in the 16th. It measures around 11 m × 9.8 m (36 ft × 32 ft), and the walls are 2.3 m (7 ft 7 in) thick at the base. Each storey contains a single large room with a fireplace, a garderobe or privy, and numerous chambers within the walls. The storeys were originally linked by a narrow spiral stair, until a larger stair tower was constructed at the east corner in the 17th century. The castle's more important prisoners were held here. Men such as Cardinal Beaton, Archbishop of St Andrews and James V's ambassador to France, and Archibald Douglas, 6th Earl of Angus, regent of Scotland in the 1520s, would have had a reasonably high standard of living, including their own servants, while in prison. The basement is vaulted, and the roof is also built on a stone vault. The parapet was rebuilt in the 20th century, although the course of projecting corbels on which it stands is original. Outside the tower is a well.

=== Spur ===
The 16th-century forework, or "spur", which provides additional protection for the main gate, is largely the work of Sir James Hamilton of Finnart, and contains numerous defensive features. Originally a rock ditch ran in front of the entrance, and was crossed by a drawbridge. The original 1693 yett, a latticed iron gate, is still in place. Once through the entrance, any attacker would have had to negotiate a dog-leg passage, exposing his back to fire from the caponier. Part of this passage was also exposed to attack from the parapet walk on the upper storey. In the late 17th century, the spur was heightened, and gun batteries added above.

== Modern use ==
Since the castle's restoration, it has been open to the public as a historic monument. The buildings of the castle stand empty, although there is a small exhibition in the former barracks outside. The castle has been used as a filming location in several productions, including Franco Zeffirelli's Hamlet (1990), Bob Carruthers's 1996 film The Bruce, and the science-fiction film Doomsday (2008). On television, Blackness has featured in the BBC/A&E television mini-series of Ivanhoe (1997), and the Starz series Outlander. It was also used as a location for the BBC Scotland historical series "Rise of the Clans".

== Bibliography ==
- Fawcett, Richard (1994). Scottish Architecture from the accession of the Stuarts to the Reformation, 1371–1560. Architectural History of Scotland. Edinburgh University Press. ISBN 0-7486-0465-0.
- Gifford, John & Walker, Frank Arneil (2002). Stirling and Central Scotland. Buildings of Scotland. Yale University Press. ISBN 0-300-09594-5.
- MacIvor, Iain (1982). Blackness Castle. HMSO. ISBN 1-903570-11-5.
- McWilliam, Colin (1978). The Buildings of Scotland: Lothian (except Edinburgh). Penguin. ISBN 0-300-09626-7.
- Fenwick, Hugh (1976). Scotland's Castles. Robert Hale. ISBN 0-7091-5731-2.
- Salter, Mike (1994). The Castles of Lothian and the Borders. Folly Publishing. ISBN 1-871731-20-8.
- Tabraham, Chris (1997). Scotland's Castles. BT Batsford/Historic Scotland. ISBN 0-7134-7965-5.
