= Jimmy Hamilton (disambiguation) =

Jimmy Hamilton (1917–1994) was an American jazz clarinetist, tenor saxophonist, arranger, composer, and music educator.

Jimmy Hamilton may refer to:

- Jimmy Hamilton (footballer, born 1904) (1904–?), English football half-back and manager
- Jimmy Hamilton (footballer, born 1906), Scottish footballer, played between 1926 and 1940
- Jimmy Hamilton (footballer, born 1954), Scottish football midfielder
- Jimmy Hamilton (curler), Scottish curler
- Jimmy Hamilton (cyclist), Scottish cyclist

== See also ==
- Jamie Hamilton (disambiguation)
- Jim Hamilton (disambiguation)
- James Hamilton (disambiguation)
