= John Livingstone (minister) =

Scottish minister (1603–1672)

The Reverend John Livingstone
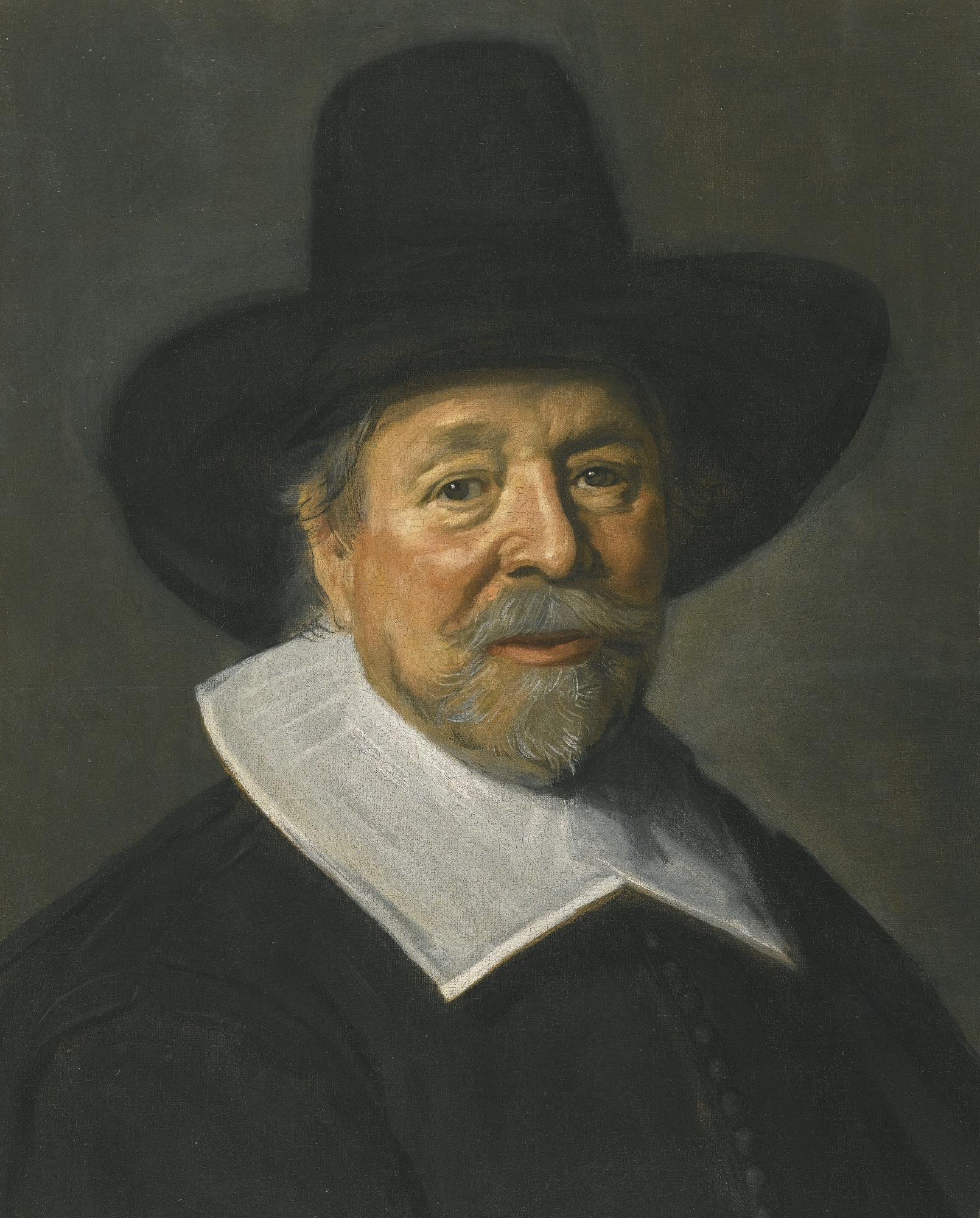
- Portrait by Frans Hals
- Church: Church of Scotland; Church of Ireland

Personal details
- Born: 1603 Kilsyth
- Died: 1672 (aged 68–69) Rotterdam
- Denomination: Presbyterian
- Occupation: Minister
- Education: University of Glasgow, University of St. Andrews
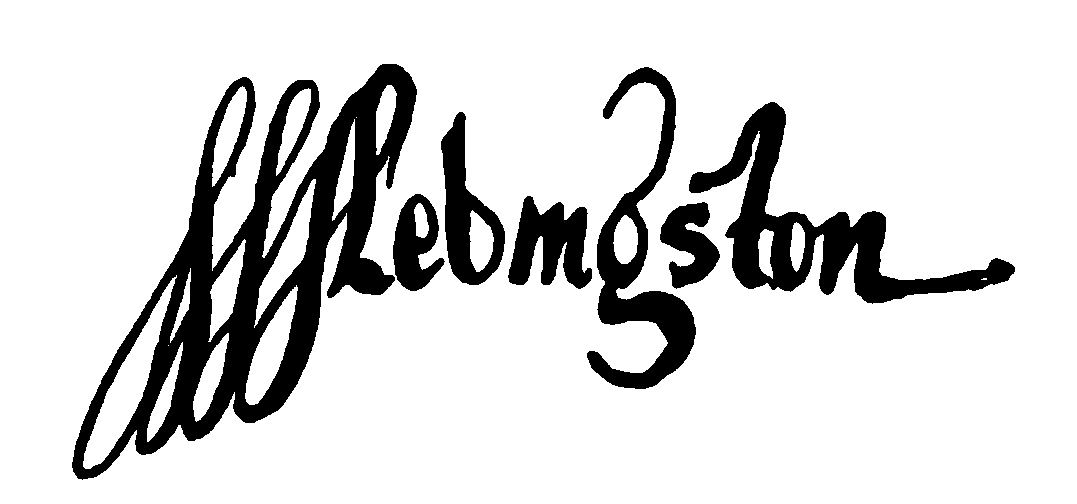
- Signature: John Livingstone's signature

John Livingstone (or Livingston; born 21 June 1603, Kilsyth – 9 August 1672) was a Scottish minister. A supporter of the Scottish Reformation, he refused to follow the episcopal church of the king of England, and preached as a Covenanter. At certain times in his career, he lost several jobs due to his non-episcopal beliefs. He preached in Scotland before moving to the north of Ireland in 1630, where he became involved in the Six Mile Water revival. He then returned to Scotland in 1638 and served in Stranraer and Roxburghshire, but preached in Ulster several times in the following years. He also wrote several biographies of his fellow preachers, including Robert Blair, Robert Cunningham and James Hamilton. After the restoration of King Charles II, Livingstone moved to Holland where he lived until his death.

== Overview ==
He was the son of William Livingstone, minister of Kilsyth, and afterwards of Lanark, said to be a descendant of the second son James, of the fourth Lord Livingston. His mother was Agnes, daughter of Alexander Livingston, portioner, Falkirk, brother of the Laird of Belstane.

He was educated at Stirling High School and graduated with an M.A. at the University of Glasgow in 1621. Against his father's wish, he preferred to enter the ministry rather than adopt the life of a country gentleman. He studied theology at St Andrews, and was licensed in 1625. For a time he assisted the minister of Torphichen, and was afterwards chaplain to the Countess of Wigtown at Cumbernauld. While engaged in the latter capacity he took part in the memorable revival at the Kirk of Shotts. He declined presentations to several parishes, chiefly on account of his reluctance to obey the Five Articles of Perth. In 1630 he went to Ireland, on the invitation of Viscount Clandeboye, and became minister of Killinchy, County Down, being ordained by Andrew Knox, Bishop of Raphoe, and a company of Scottish ministers who had taken up a kind of middle position between Presbyterianism and Prelacy.

In 1631 he was suspended for nonconformity, but was soon reinstated through the friendly offices of Archbishop Ussher. Unfortunately, he had a bitter enemy in Robert Echlin, the Bishop of Down and Connor. On 4 May 1632 Echlin had him deposed and excommunicated for the same cause. Having resolved to emigrate to America, he left Ireland in September 1636, along with a number of his parishioners and other Scottish and English Puritans - 140 in all. They sailed for New England in the Eagle Wing, but through contrary winds were obliged to return home. In 1638 he signed the National Covenant, and was commissioned to proceed to London with copies of it for supporters of the Scottish cause at Court. On 5 July 1638 he was admitted minister of Stranraer, where he remained for ten years. It is recorded that his half-yearly communions there were attended by as many as five hundred of his old parishioners of Killinchy. In 1640 he was chaplain of the Earl of Cassillis's Regiment in England, and wrote an account of the skirmish at Newburn, which he had witnessed. When minister of Stranraer he frequently crossed to Ulster, and officiated to the Scottish troops quartered there.

In 1648 the Commission of Assembly sent him to dissuade those troops from joining the army of the "Engagement," but his mission was a failure. On 13 July 1647, William, Earl of Lothian, presented Livingston to Ancram, and he was admitted and installed on 25 April 1648. He was a member of the Commission of Assembly in 1649. Next year he was one of those appointed to negotiate with Charles II., at Breda, as to the terms on which he should receive the Crown. While the royal ships were lying at anchor off Speymouth, Livingston obtained the King's oath of fidelity to the Covenants. He did not, however, trust Charles, and soon afterwards he identified himself with those who opposed the coronation and the conduct of the government. He was asked by the General Assembly of 1650 to write a History of the Church of Scotland from 1638, but this was never completed.

In October 1651 he was chosen Moderator of a general meeting of the Protesters. He preached before Cromwell in London in 1654, and was authorised by the Protector to recommend candidates for vacant parishes. Between 1655 and 1659 he declined calls to Antrim, to his former charge at Killinchy, and to Glasgow. He was summoned before the Privy Council 11 December 1662, the same day as Robert Traill, and, refusing to take the Oath of Allegiance, was banished. He went to Rotterdam in April 1663, where he spent his last years in almost constant study, and in the preparation of a Latin version of the Scriptures which was never published. He died on 9 August 1672. He is described as having been modest in manner, sweet in temper, of retired and contemplative habits; so that, though he joined the more extreme Presbyterians, in his moderation he deeply lamented the division that had torn the Church asunder.

== Early life and education ==
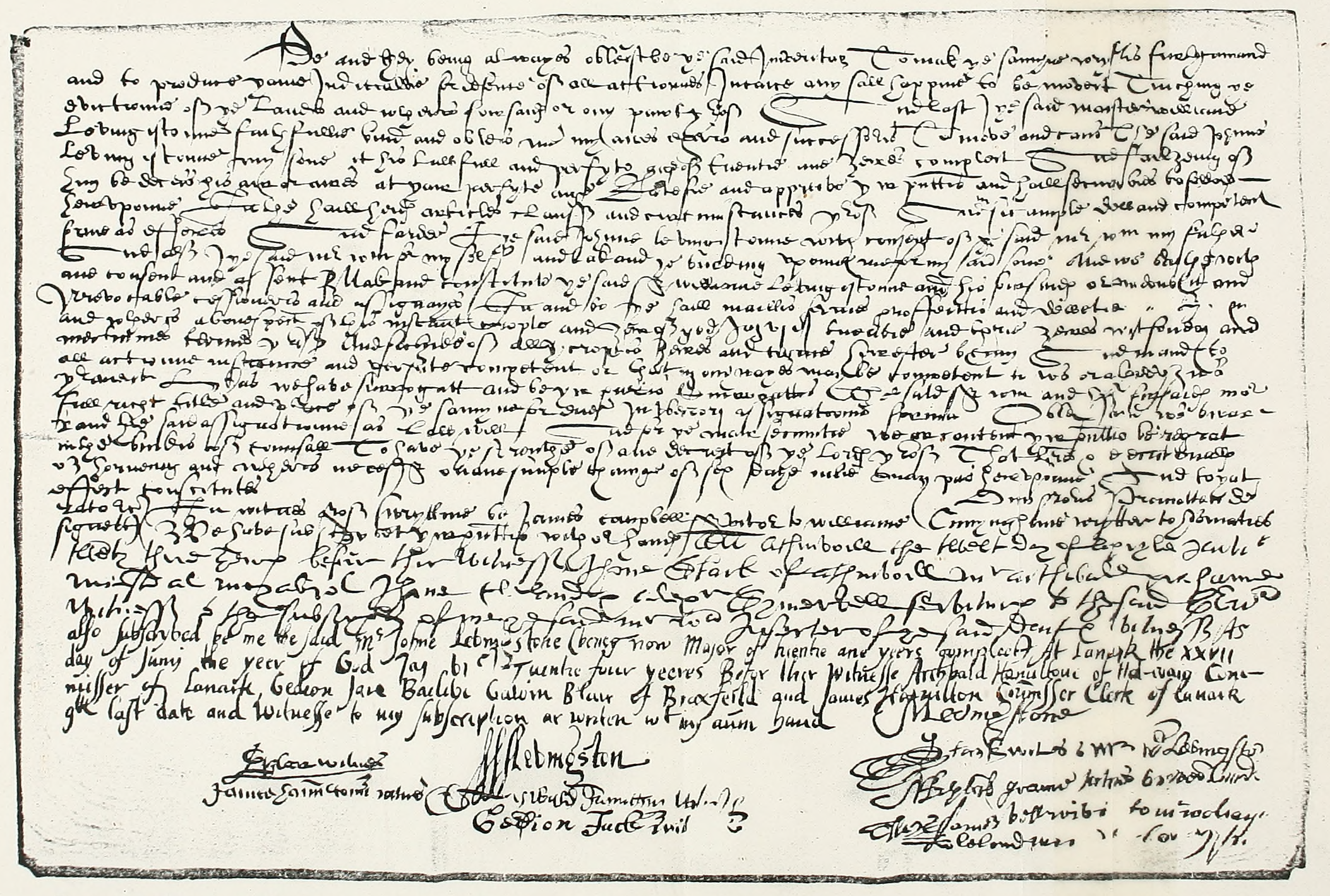
John Livingstone's sale of land near Kilsyth. The last four lines are written in his own hand.

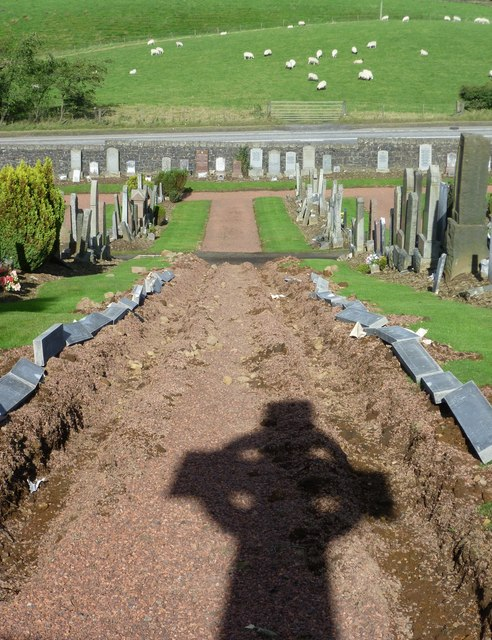
Two flocks at Kirk o Shotts, where around 500 were affected by a 2-and-a-half-hour Livingstone sermon in the rain.

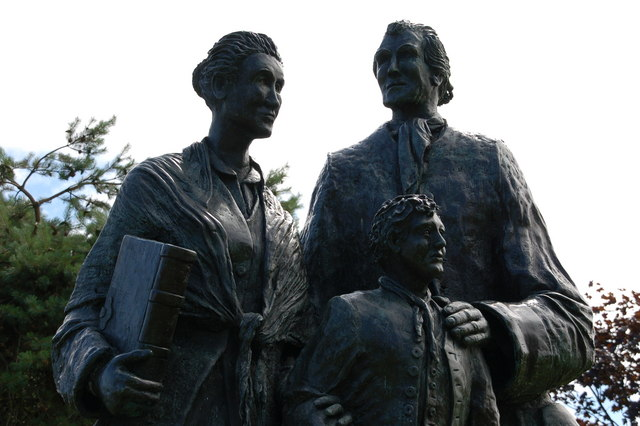
Emigrants memorial, Larne commemorating the first ship to leave Larne for America in 1717. The Eagle Wing left Groomsport in 1636 and was over halfway there when they turned back. (The Mayflower sailed in 1620).

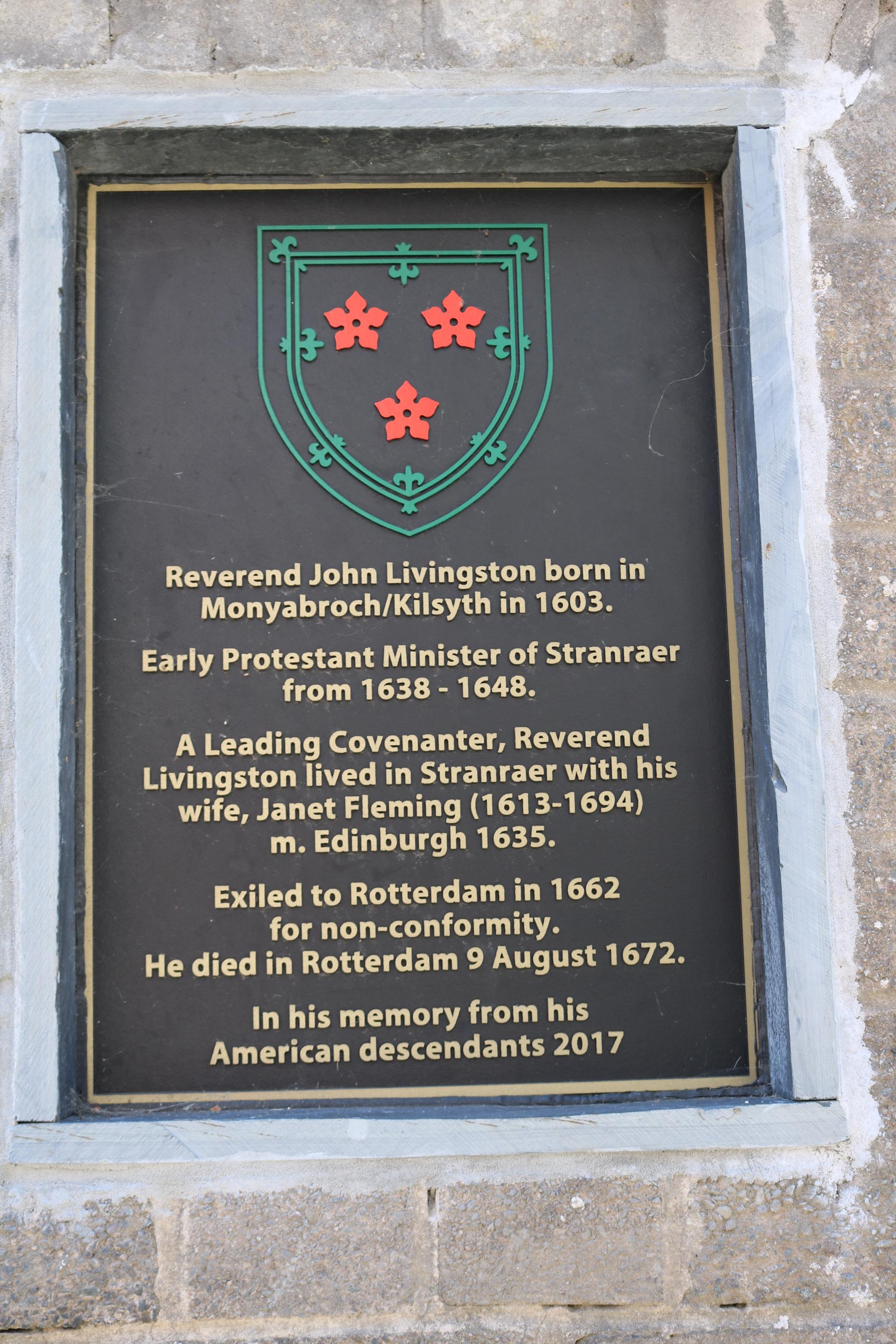
Plaque to the Reverend John Livingston at Stranraer

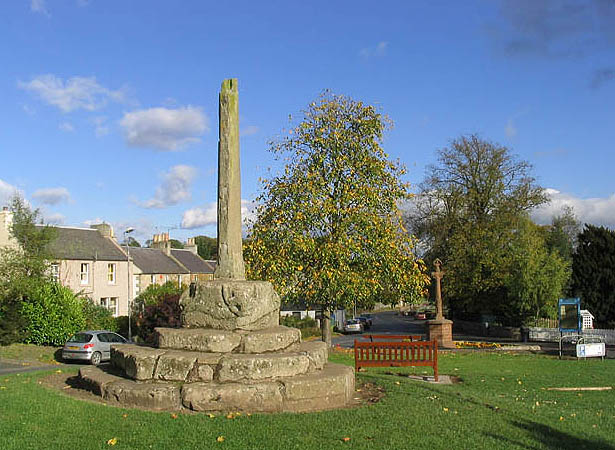
Ancrum Market Cross

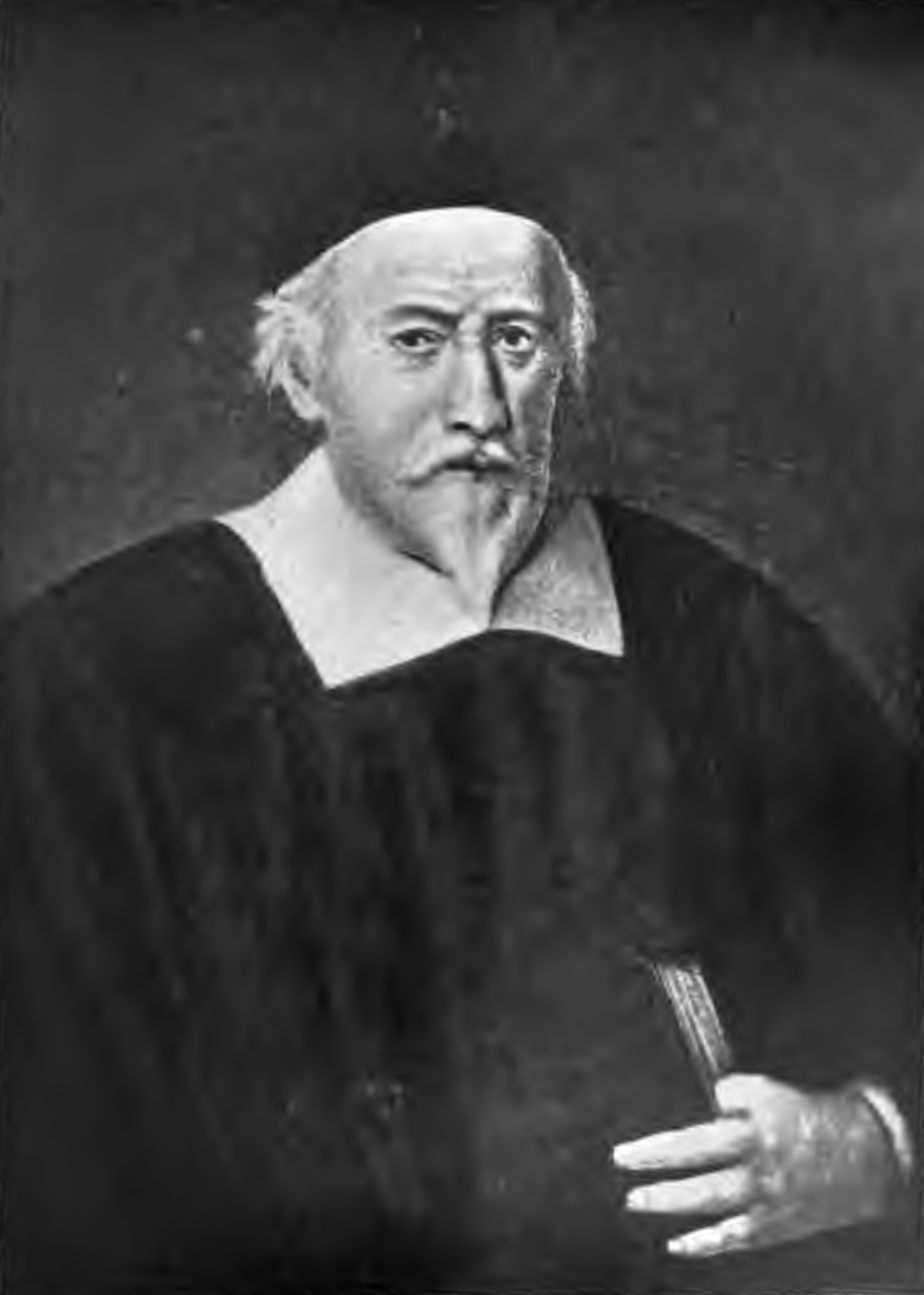
Livingston's portrait

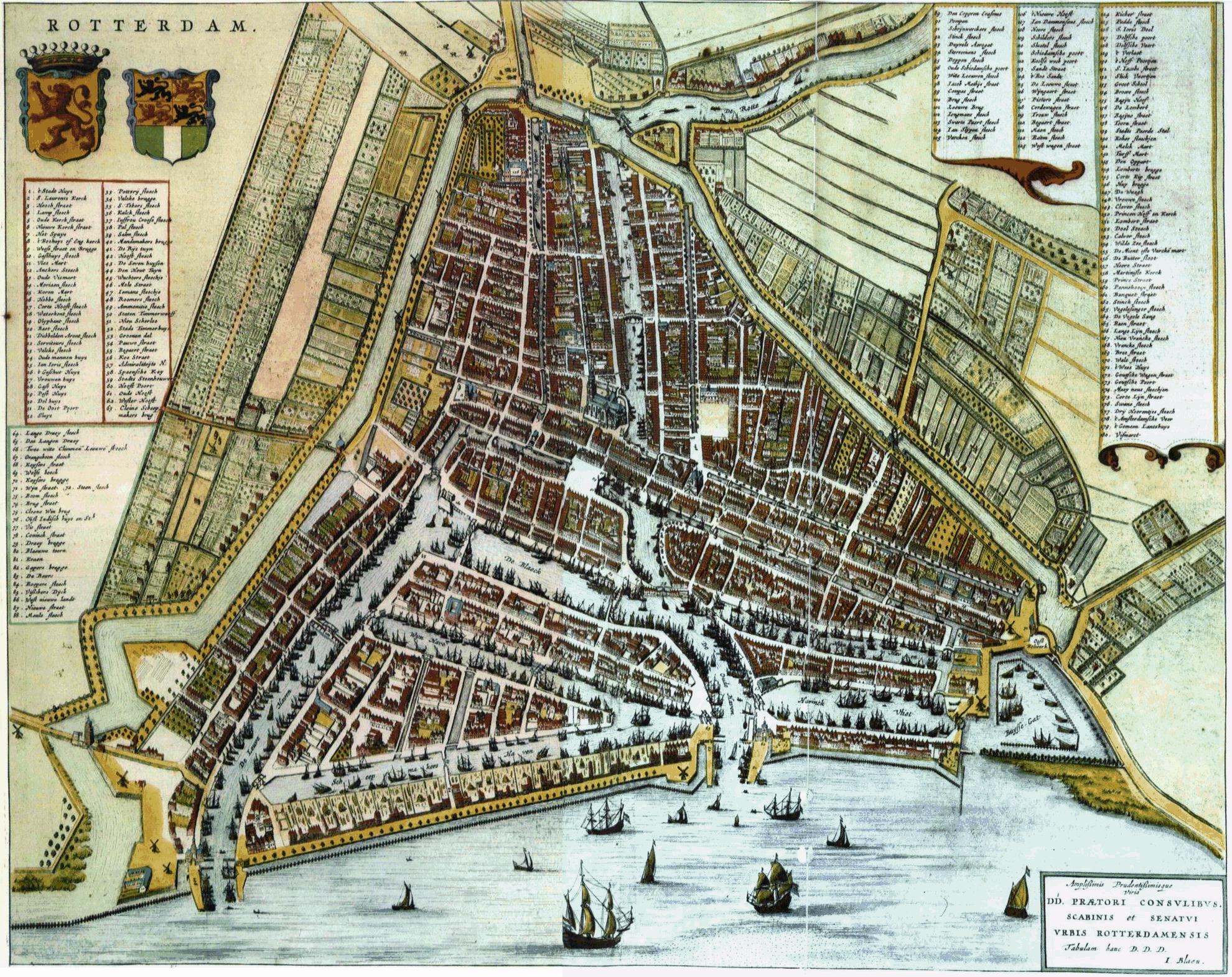
Rotterdam 1649 by Joan Blaeu

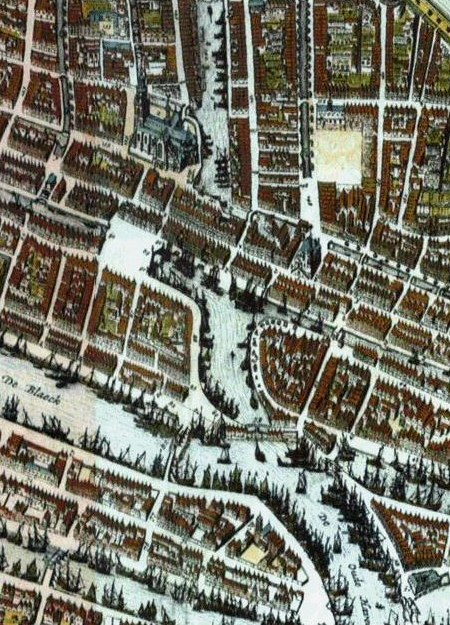
Rotterdam Stairs 1652

John Livingstone (1603–1672), Scottish divine, was born in Monyabroch now known as Kilsyth, Stirlingshire, on 21 January 1603. His father was William Livingstone, minister of that parish and afterwards of Lanark, who was descended from the fifth Lord Livingstone, and his mother was Agnes Livingstone, of the house of Dunipace. He was educated at the grammar school of Stirling by Mr William Wallace, studying Latin and Greek, and stayed there from 1613 until 1617 when he was called to Lanark as his mother was dying. In his first year, he was often beaten, once being hit in the face by a ruler. He was persuaded to stay an extra year at school and this was largely self-study and was the most profitable he says. At Stirling he took the Lord's Supper in Mr Patrick Simson's church which initially caused him to tremble. He continued his education at the University of Glasgow, under Boyd of Trochrigg, from where he graduated in 1621. His father wished him to marry and settle down on an estate which he had purchased, but he resolved to study for the church, and having completed his theological course, received licence to preach in 1625. He had been devout from his early years and did not remember, as he tells us in his ‘Autobiography,’ any particular time of conversion.

== Early ministry ==
He acted as assistant for a time in the parish of Torphichen, and afterwards as chaplain to the Countess of Wigton. He was in great request as a preacher and was still unordained, when, on the Monday after a communion, on his 27th birthday, in June 1630, he preached in the Kirk of Shotts, Lanarkshire, a sermon which is said to have produced a serious change in five hundred of his hearers. Patrons and parishes were anxious to secure his services, but his refusal to give the promise then required of obedience to the articles of Perth stood in the way of his receiving ordination. He would often preach for less than half an hour which was considered short at the time.

== Killinche ministry ==
As there was no prospect of a settlement at home, Livingstone went over to Ireland in 1630 on the invitation of Lord Clandeboye, and soon afterwards became minister of Killinshie or Killinchy in the diocese of Down. Livingstone came after being urged by Robert Cunningham, minister of Holywood. He was ordained by some Scottish ministers under the presidency of Andrew Knox, bishop of Raphoe, who, to accommodate his countrymen, omitted those portions of the English ordinal to which they objected. In 1631 Livingstone was suspended for nonconformity by Robert Echlin, the Bishop of Down and Connor, but was restored on the intervention of Archbishop Ussher. A few years later, at the insistence of Bishop Echlin, he was deposed and excommunicated for the same cause. In September 1636 he and other Scots and English puritans to the number of 140 sailed for New England in a ship called the Eagle Wing, which they had built for the purpose. They were chiefly Presbyterians, but some of them inclined to Independency and others to Brownism. There were four Scots ministers on board: Robert Blair, their leader, James Hamilton, Livingstone and John M'Clellan. Meeting with a great storm halfway across the Atlantic, they were obliged to put back, and returned to Lochfergus, where they had embarked nearly two months before. Livingstone soon afterwards went over to Scotland, and when the national covenant was signed in March 1638 he was sent up to London with copies for friends at court.

== Stranraer ministry ==
In July of that year, he was inducted to the parish of Stranraer, where his ministry produced a great impression, and his communions were attended by crowds from Ireland. He was a member of the Glasgow assembly of 1638, and of all subsequent assemblies till 1650, except that of 1640. In that year he went as chaplain of the Earl of Cassilis's regiment to Newcastle, and was present at the skirmish of Newburn, of which he wrote an account. He and other Scots who returned from Ireland formed the nucleus of an extreme party, which introduced innovations previously unknown in Scotland, such as the omission of the Lord's Prayer, creed, and ‘Gloria Patri’ in public worship. These novelties were condemned by the early covenanting assemblies, but soon spread and gradually leavened the whole lump. During his ministry at Stranraer Livingstone frequently spent some months of the summer in Ulster, supplying vacant charges or officiating to the Scottish troops quartered there. In 1648 the commission of the assembly sent him to dissuade these troops from obeying the order of the Scottish estates to join the army and then being raised in support of the ‘Engagement,’ but in this mission, he was not successful.

== Ancrum ministry ==
In August of that year he was translated to the parish of Ancrum, Roxburghshire, on the presentation of the Earl of Lothian. He was one of the commissioners appointed by the church to treat with Charles II at Breda in 1650, and while the ships conveying the royal party were lying at anchor off Speymouth, on their return to Scotland, Livingstone received the king's oath of fidelity to the covenants. He did all this most reluctantly, not believing in the king's sincerity, and he afterwards joined the ultra-rigid party who opposed Charles's coronation and administration of the government. His party soon protested against the resolutions of the church that those who had taken part in the ‘Engagement’ might, on making professions of penitence, be allowed to serve in defence of the country. With his friends, Livingstone subsequently disowned the authority of the general assembly, and formed the first schism in the reformed church. He was elected moderator of the meeting of protesters held in October 1651, but he was among the less resolute of the party, and withdrew from their councils when he recognised their dangerous tendency. After Cromwell had put an end to the meetings of the general assembly, Livingstone resolved to introduce a system for managing Scottish ecclesiastical affairs similar to that of the ‘tryers’ in England, and sent for Livingstone and two other protesters to secure their cooperation. ‘Being at London,’ he says, ‘I found no great satisfaction, and therefore I left the other two there and came home.’ After the Restoration, he was called before the privy council, and on refusing to take the oath of allegiance because of its Erastian terms, was banished.

Following his banishment, there was an incident in his parish at Ancrum when a Mr. James Scott, a person under sentence of excommunication, was presented to the charge. On the day fixed for his settlement in the parish, several people met to oppose it, and particularly a countrywoman desiring to speak with him, with the view of dissuading him from intruding himself upon a reclaiming people, pulled him by the cloak, entreating him to hear her a little; on which he turned and beat her with his staff. This provoked a number of boys to throw a few stones, but they did not touch him or any of his company. The occurrence was, however, magnified into a great offence, and the sheriff and justices fined and imprisoned some of the people. But the punishment being deemed too lenient, the offenders were taken to Edinburgh, and dealt with as criminals. The boys admitted throwing the stones, and were sentenced to be scourged through the streets of Edinburgh, burned in the face with a hot iron, and then sold as slaves to Barbadoes. Two brothers of the woman, named Turnbull, were banished to Virginia, and the woman was ordered to be whipped through the streets of Jedburgh. The bishop of Glasgow, when applied to for a mitigation of the sentence, lest the woman should be with child, mildly answered that he would make them claw the itch out of her shoulders.

== In Rotterdam ==
He chose Rotterdam as his place of exile, and spent the remainder of his life there, often preaching in the Scottish church and devoting himself to theological study. He died on 9 August 1672, aged 70, and is widely remembered as a preacher of extraordinary popular gifts. His own estimate of his sermons was, however, a very modest one, and he describes himself generally as ‘timorous, averse from debates, rather given to laziness than rashness, too easy to be wrought upon.’ In his later years, he expressed a great abhorrence of sectarianism. He had a good knowledge of Latin, Hebrew, and Chaldee, and could read French, Italian, Spanish, Dutch, and German.

== Personal life ==
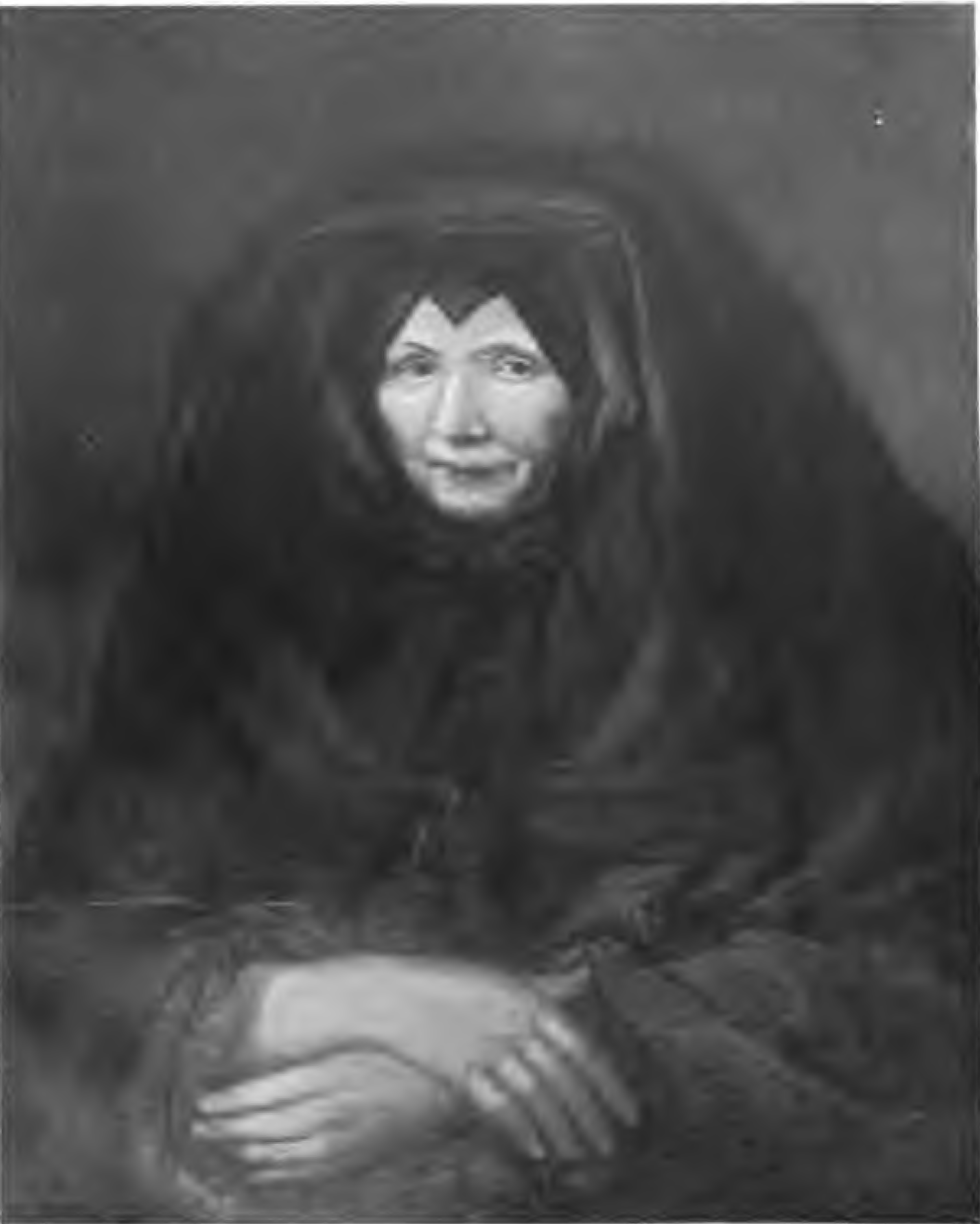
Janet Fleming, wife of John Livingston

Livingstone married on 23 June 1635 (in St Cuthbert's Church, Edinburgh), Janet Fleming (d. 1693 at Rotterdam). She was the eldest daughter of Bartholomew Fleming, an Edinburgh merchant, and Marion Hamilton; the couple went on to have 15 children.

- John, born 30 June 1636, died 8 January 1639;
- William, merchant in Edinburgh, born 7 January 1638, buried 12 June 1700;
- Bartholomew, born 3 September 1639, died 24 September 1641;
- Agnes, born 20 September 1640, died 17 October 1641;
- Marion, born 10 October 1642 (married John Scott, minister of Hawick);
- Janet, born 28 September 1643 (married Andrew Russell, merchant, Rotterdam), died August 1696;
- John, born 20 August 1644, died October 1645;
- Agnes, born 18 August 1645 (married David Cleland, surgeon);
- James, merchant, Edinburgh, born 22 September 1646, died 1700. He was the father of Robert Livingston The Younger;
- Johanna, born September died October 1647;
- Barbara, born 21 June 1649 (married James Miller, merchant);
- John, born 29 January, died 12 October 1652;
- Andrew, born August 1653, died 7 February 1655;
- Robert Livingston the Elder, ancestor of the Livingstons of Livingston Manor, New York, born 13 December 1654, died April 1725;
- Elizabeth, born 7 January 1657, died 31 October 1666.

One of his sons emigrated to America, and has left distinguished descendants.

Original portraits of John Livingston and his wife are at Gosford, East Lothian, and Monymusk, Aberdeenshire, and others were in the possession of Mrs Ralston Crosby, New York.

== Works ==
Hew Scott:

- A Letter to his Paroch (Leith, 1663);
- A Brief Historical Relation of the Life of Mr John Livingston (Glasgow, 1754; Edinburgh, 1848; edited by Thomas Houston);
- Memorable Characteristics and Remarkable Passages of Divine Providence exemplified in the Lives of a considerable number of the most Eminent Divines and Private Christians who lived in Scotland during the first century after the Reformation (Glasgow, 1754). These, with other Letters and Papers of Livingston, were edited by William King Tweedie' for the Wodrow Society (Select Biographies, vol. i., Edinburgh, 1845).

DNB: His works are:

1. ‘Letters from Leith to his Parishioners,’ 1633, 4to, 1673.
2. His ‘Life,’ first published at Glasgow in 1754, together with
3. ‘Remarkable Observations upon the Lives of the most eminent Ministers and Professors in the Church of Scotland.’ The last work was edited in 1845–6 for the Wodrow Society by W. K. Tweedie. An edition of the ‘Life’ by T. Houston was published at Edinburgh in 1848. Livingstone also wrote during his exile a new Latin translation of the Old Testament, which was approved by eminent Dutch divines but was not published.
