= James Hamilton =

James Hamilton may refer to:

== Dukes ==
- James Hamilton, 1st Duke of Hamilton (1606–1649), heir to the throne of Scotland
- James Hamilton, 4th Duke of Hamilton (1658–1712), Scottish nobleman
- James Hamilton, 5th Duke of Hamilton (1703–1743), Scottish nobleman
- James Hamilton, 6th Duke of Hamilton (1724–1758), Scottish nobleman
- James Hamilton, 7th Duke of Hamilton (1755–1769), Scottish nobleman
- James Hamilton, 1st Duke of Abercorn (1811–1885), twice served as Lord Lieutenant of Ireland
- James Hamilton, 2nd Duke of Abercorn (1838–1913), British nobleman and diplomat
- James Hamilton, 3rd Duke of Abercorn (1869–1953), first governor of Northern Ireland
- James Hamilton, 4th Duke of Abercorn (1904–1979), Northern Irish senator
- James Hamilton, 5th Duke of Abercorn (born 1934), Northern Irish politician

== Marquesses ==
- James Hamilton, 2nd Marquess of Hamilton (1589–1625), 4th Earl of Arran, Scottish nobleman

== Earls ==
- James Hamilton, 1st Earl of Arran (c. 1475–1529), Scottish nobleman
- James Hamilton, Duke of Châtellerault (c. 1516–1575), and 2nd Earl of Arran, Scottish nobleman
- James Hamilton, 3rd Earl of Arran (c. 1537–1609), Scottish nobleman
- James Hamilton, 1st Earl of Abercorn (c. 1575–1618), Sheriff of Linlithgow
- James Hamilton, 2nd Earl of Abercorn (c. 1604–c. 1670), Scottish nobleman
- James Hamilton, 6th Earl of Abercorn (c. 1661–1734), Scottish and Irish nobleman
- James Hamilton, 7th Earl of Abercorn (1686–1744), Scottish nobleman and amateur scientist
- James Hamilton, 8th Earl of Abercorn (1712–1789), Scottish and Irish nobleman
- James Hamilton, 1st Earl of Clanbrassil (first creation) (died 1659), Anglo-Irish Royalist peer, soldier and politician
- James Hamilton, 1st Earl of Clanbrassil (second creation) (1694–1758), British politician
- James Hamilton, 2nd Earl of Clanbrassil (1730–1798), Irish peer

== Viscounts ==
- James Hamilton, 1st Viscount Claneboye (1560–1644), Ulster Scot land owner and settler
- James Hamilton, Viscount Hamilton (1786–1814), British politician

== Barons and other nobles ==
- Sir James Hamilton of Cadzow (before 1397–c. 1440), 5th Laird of Cadzow
- James Hamilton, 1st Lord Hamilton (1415–1479), Scottish nobleman
- Sir James Hamilton of Finnart (died 1540), military engineer, illegitimate son of the 1st earl and guardian to the 2nd
- James Hamilton, 3rd Baron Hamilton of Strabane (1633–1655), Irish nobleman
- James Hamilton, Lord Paisley (died before 1670), eldest son of James Hamilton, 2nd Earl of Abercorn
- James Hamilton, 4th Baron Hamilton of Dalzell (1938–2006), British politician
- James Douglas-Hamilton, Baron Selkirk of Douglas (born 1942), member of the Scottish Parliament
- James Hamilton, Lord Pencaitland (1659–1729), Scottish judge

== Arts and entertainment ==
- James Hamilton (painter), Scottish painter
- James Whitelaw Hamilton (1860–1932), Scottish artist
- Neil Hamilton (actor) (James Neil Hamilton, 1899–1984), American actor
- Jimmy Hamilton (1917–1994), American jazz musician
- James Hamilton (photographer), American photographer
- James Alexander Hamilton (music writer) (1785–1845), English compiler of musical instruction books
- James G. C. Hamilton, American sculptor
- James Hamilton (DJ and journalist) (1942–1996), British DJ and journalist for Record Mirror and Music Week

== Clergy ==
- James Hamilton (bishop of Argyll) (died 1580), Scottish prelate
- James Hamilton (minister, born 1600) (1600–1666), Scottish minister, active in Ireland
- James Hamilton (bishop of Galloway) (1610–1674), Scottish prelate
- James Hamilton (archdeacon of Raphoe) (1636–1689), Irish Anglican priest
- James Hamilton (priest, born 1748) (1748–1815), Irish priest and astronomer
- James Hamilton (minister, born 1814) (1814–1867), Scottish minister and author, primarily in London

== Military ==
- James Hamilton (English army officer) (c. 1620–1673), Irish courtier and soldier, during the reign of Charles II of England
- James Inglis Hamilton (died 1803), general in the British Army
- James Hamilton (British Army officer, born 1777) (1777–1815), British army colonel
- James de Courcy Hamilton (1860–1936), British Royal Navy officer and fire officer

== Politics ==
- Sir James Hamilton (died 1605), shire commissioner for Lanarkshire (Parliament of Scotland constituency)
- James Hamilton (died 1633), burgh commissioner for Glasgow (Parliament of Scotland constituency)
- James Hamilton (1617–1646), member of parliament for Bangor (Parliament of Ireland constituency)
- James Hamilton (died 1707), shire commissioner for Lanarkshire (Parliament of Scotland constituency)
- James Hamilton of Bangour (died 1706), burgh commissioner for Dunfermline (Parliament of Scotland constituency)
- Sir James Hamilton (1644–1706), member of parliament for Bangor and County Down (Parliament of Ireland constituency)
- James Hamilton (1651–1700), member of parliament for Down and Downpatrick (Parliament of Ireland constituency)
- Sir James Hamilton, 2nd Baronet, of Rosehall (1682–1750), member of parliament for Lanarkshire
- James Hamilton (1685–1771), member of parliament for Newry (Parliament of Ireland constituency) and Carlow
- James Hamilton (Pennsylvania politician) (1710–1783), mayor of Philadelphia and lieutenant-governor of Pennsylvania
- James Hamilton Jr. (1786–1857), governor and representative for South Carolina
- James Alexander Hamilton (1788–1878), acting U.S. secretary of state under president Andrew Jackson
- Sir James Hamilton, 2nd Baronet, of Woodbrook (1802–1876), British politician, member of parliament for Sudbury
- James Hans Hamilton (1810–1863), Anglo-Irish member of parliament
- James Kent Hamilton (1839–1918), mayor of Toledo, Ohio
- James A. Hamilton (1876–1950), secretary of state of New York 1923–1924
- James Hamilton (Scottish politician) (1918–2005), Scottish politician
- James Harold Hamilton (1932–2009), American politician in the Alabama House of Representatives
- James E. Hamilton (born 1935), American politician in the state of Oklahoma
- James R. Hamilton (1938–2011), American politician in the Georgia State Senate
- James Hamilton (barrister) (born 1949), Irish barrister and director of public prosecutions in Ireland

== Sports ==
- James Hamilton (American football) (born 1974), American football player
- James Hamilton (cricketer) (1843–1881), Australian cricketer
- James Hamilton (footballer, born 1869) (1869–1951), Scottish football (soccer) player for Queen's Park and the national team
- James Hamilton (footballer, born 1884) (1884–?), English football (soccer) player
- James Hamilton (footballer, born 1901) (1901–1975), Scottish football (soccer) player for St Mirren, Rangers, Blackpool and the national team
- James Hamilton (footballer, born 1904), English footballer for Crystal Palace
- James Hamilton (footballer, born 1906), Scottish footballer for Carlisle United and Rochdale
- James Hamilton (footballer, born 1955), Scottish footballer for Sunderland and Carlisle United
- James Hamilton (snowboarder) (born 1989), New Zealand Olympic snowboarder
- Jimmy Hamilton (curler), 1963 World Curling Championships known as the Scotch Cup

== Other people ==
- James Alexander Greer Hamilton (1854–1925), principal surgeon at North Adelaide Hospital, South Australia
- James Hamilton (assassin) (died 1581), assassin
- James Hamilton (physician) (1767–1839), Scottish physician
- James Hamilton (language teacher) (1769–1829), Irish proponent of the "Hamiltonian system" for teaching languages
- James M. Hamilton (1861–1940), third president of Montana State University, 1904–1919
- James Stevenson-Hamilton (1867–1957), founder of the Kruger National Park, South Africa
- Jamie Hamilton (publisher) (1900–1988), Scottish-American book publisher and champion oarsman
- James Hamilton (physicist) (1918–2000), Irish mathematician and theoretical physicist
- James D. Hamilton (born 1954), econometrician
- Sir James Arnot Hamilton (1923–2012), British aerospace engineer
- James P. Hamilton, professor of chemistry
- James Hamilton (attorney), known for participation in the United States Senate Watergate Committee

== See also ==
- Jamie Hamilton (disambiguation)
- Jim Hamilton (disambiguation)
- Jimmy Hamilton (disambiguation)
- Hamish Hamilton, a former British book publishing house (Gaelic version of the name James Hamilton)
