= Edward Brice =

Scottish minister

Edward Brice or Bryce (c. 1569–1636) was a Scottish Presbyterian minister, the first Presbyterian with a living in Ireland.

== Life ==
He was born at Airth, Stirlingshire, about 1569, and is named Bryce in the Scottish records, but Brice in the Irish records. He entered the University of Edinburgh in about 1589, and studied under Charles Ferme (or Fairholm). He laureated 12 August 1593. On 30 December 1595 he was admitted by the Stirling presbytery to the parochial charge of Bothkennar. He was translated to Drymen on 14 May 1602 and admitted on 30 September by the Dumbarton presbytery.

At the synod of Glasgow on 18 August 1607, he bitterly opposed the appointment of John Spottiswoode as permanent moderator, in accordance with the king's recommendation, adopted by the general assembly at Linlithgow on 10 December 1606. In 1613 Archbishop Spottiswoode and the presbytery of Glasgow deposed him for adultery. Robert Echlin, bishop of Down and Connor then gave Brice the cure of Templecorran (otherwise known as Ballycarry or Broadisland) in County Antrim in 1613 (maybe 1614, New Style). William Edmunstone, laird of Duntreath, Stirlingshire, who had joined in the plantation of the Ards, County Down, in 1606, was now at Broadisland, having obtained a perpetual lease of on lands there on 28 May 1609.

The tradition is that Brice preached alternately at Templecorran and Ballykeel, Islandmagee. In September 1619 Echlin conferred on him the prebend of Kilroot. The Ulster Visitation of 1622 says that Brice 'serveth the cures of Templecorran and Kilroot - church at Kilroot decayed - that at Ballycarry has the walls newly erected, but not roofed.' He became involved in the Six Mile Water revival of 1625..

In 1629 Brice is described as aged man and in 1630, when present on a communion Sunday at Templepatrick, he was unable to preach as appointed. Henry Calvert (or Colwort), an Englishman, was brought in by Lady Duntreath of Broadisland, as assistant to Brice; in June 1630 Calvert became minister of Muckamore (or Oldstone), County Antrim.

On Echlin's death, 17 July 1635, Henry Leslie succeeded as bishop, and held his primary visitation at Lisburn in July 1636, and requiring subscription from all the clergy. Brice and Calvert were among the five who refused compliance, two others being James Hamilton and John Ridge. A private conference produced no result, and though on 11 August Leslie made concessions on the conduct of services, the subscription was still refused. On the 12 August, he, along with Hamilton and Ridge, was suspended from his post by Bishop Leslie, due to a refusal to follow church episcopy.

Brice died soon after, and the Presbyterians appointed no regular successor to him till 1646. His tombstone at the ruined church of Ballycarry says that he died, aged 67, and left two sons and two daughters. His eldest son, Robert, acquired a fortune at Castlechester, then the point of departure for the Scottish mail; pennies are extant with his name, dated Castlechester, 1671.
