= James Hamilton (minister, born 1600) =

Scottish minister

- Church: Church of Scotland, Church of Ireland

Personal details
- Born: 1600
- Died: 10 March 1666 Edinburgh
- Denomination: Presbyterian
- Occupation: minister

James Hamilton (1600–1666) was a 17th-century Scottish minister of the Church of Scotland, later active in Ireland until deposed from his living.

== Life ==
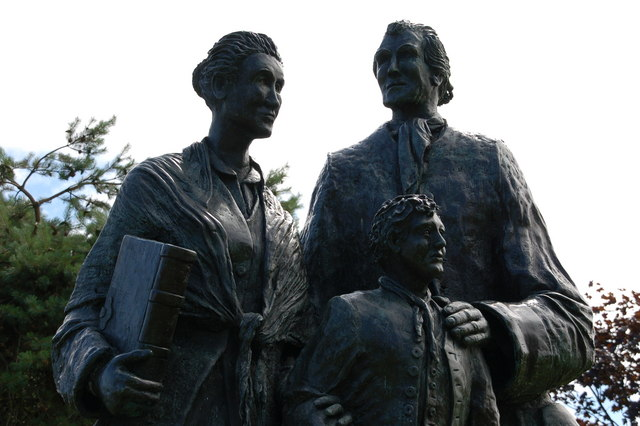
Emigrants memorial, Larne commemorating the first ship to leave Larne for America in 1717. The Eagle Wing left Groomsport in 1636 and was over half way there when they turned back. (The Mayflower sailed in 1620).

He was born in 1600 the second son of Gawen Hamilton, third son of Hans Hamilton, vicar of Dunlop. He was nephew of Viscount Clandeboye in northern Ireland.

After studying at Glasgow University he was appointed by his uncle, James Hamilton, 1st Viscount Claneboye as land agent, overseer and general manager of his estates in Ireland. He attracted the attention of Robert Blair, at that time minister of the church at Bangor, County Down, who persuaded him to enter the ministry. In 1626, despite unorthodox views which resembled Blair's own in regard to episcopacy, he was ordained by Bishop Robert Echlin, and presented by Lord Claneboye to the church at Ballywalter in County Down.

=== Ireland ===
He was involved with the Six Mile Water revival in Country Antrim. The revival began with the preaching of James Glendinning at Oldstone, and his successor Josias Welsh (grandson of John Knox). Other preachers such as Robert Blair, Robert Cunningham and John Ridge were also involved. The Christian revival soon spread through countries Antrim and Down and lasted for almost ten years.

In 1636 Thomas Wentworth and John Bramhall set new terms of church communion to be sworn to in the Church of Ireland. Hamilton did not submit, and his example was followed by other ministers including Edward Brice and John Ridge. Henry Leslie, Echlin's successor, was urged by Bramhall to proceed to their deposition; Leslie challenged them to a public disputation. His challenge was accepted, and Hamilton was chosen to conduct the defence on their behalf. The conference opened on 11 August 1636, in the presence of a large assembly. Bramhall called a halt, and, having obtained an adjournment, persuaded Leslie not to resume it, but to pass sentence on the recalcitrant ministers. On the following day Hamilton, along with Ridge and Cunningham, was suspended from his post, due to their refusing to follow church episcopy. Warrants were issued for their arrest, and Hamilton left for Scotland, where he was appointed minister of the church at Dumfries.

=== Scotland ===
In September 1636 he and other Scots and English puritans to the number of 140 sailed for New England in a ship called the Eagle Wing, which they had built for the purpose. They were chiefly Presbyterians, but some of them inclined to Independency and others to Brownism. There were four Scots ministers on board: Blair, their leader, James Hamilton, John Livingstone and John M'Clellan.

Most histories have no record of his journey to America, and this may have been a different James Hamilton. The next secure record of Hamilton is in 1638 when he joined the Church of Scotland and settled in Dumfries in southwest Scotland.

In September 1642 he was commissioned by the General Assembly of the Church of Scotland to visit Ireland, in order to minister to the Ulster Scots, but returning to Scotland he was in March 1644 appointed by the general assembly to superintend the administration of the solemn league and covenant in Ulster. On his return to Scotland the ship in which he and several others, including his father-in-law, had taken their passage, was captured by the "Harp", a Wexford frigate, commanded by Alaster MacDonnell, who was bringing reinforcements to James Graham, 1st Marquess of Montrose in the Highlands. MacDonnell, who hoped by an exchange of prisoners to secure the release of his father, Colkittagh, then in the hands of Archibald Campbell, 1st Marquess of Argyll, landed his prisoners at Ardnamurchan, and confined them in Mingary Castle. There Hamilton remained for ten months; several of his companions were released, but his father-in-law, the Rev. David Watson, and another minister, Mr. Weir, both died. Exertions of the general assembly and Scottish parliament set him free on 2 May 1645.

He returned to his charge at Dumfries, and was afterwards moved to Edinburgh. Being appointed a chaplain to Charles II by the general assembly, he was taken prisoner on 28 August 1651 at Alyth in Forfarshire by Colonel Matthew Alured and Colonel Morgan, and taken to London, where he was confined for over a year in the Tower of London. Released on 20 November 1652 on Oliver Cromwell's order, he returned to Edinburgh, where he preached until the restoration of the episcopacy in Scotland which drove him from his pulpit. He retired to Inveresk in August 1662, and died at Edinburgh on 10 March 1666.

== Family ==
He married

- (1) Elizabeth, daughter of David Watson, minister of Killeavy, near Newry, Ireland, by whom he had fifteen children; of whom Archibald, minister of Killinchy, who was a leading minister in the Presbyterian church in Ireland, Jane, Mary, Margaret, and Elizabeth, only arrived at maturity
- (2) Anna, daughter of Sir James Pringle of Galashiels, and widow of William Inglis, W.S., who in her old age (being 80 years) and poverty on 10 February 1687 presented a petition to the Exchequer; she was buried 5 September 1691 (Charity Papers)

== Bibliography ==
- Hamilton MSS. ed. by T. K. Lowry
- Reid's Hist, of the Presbyterian Church in Ireland
- Patrick Adair's True Narrative of the Rise and Progress of the Presbyterian Church
- McBride's Sample of Jet-Black Prelatic Calumny, Glasgow, 1713
- Lives of the Revs. Robert Blair and John Livingstone
- Edin. Counc, Canongate (bur.), and Test. Registers
- Livingstone's Charac.
- Nicoll's, Lamont's, and Brodie's Diaries
- Reid's Ireland, Acts of Ass., and Pari.
- Reg. Sec. Sig., Peterkin's Rec.
- Baillie's Lett., ii., iii.
- Stevenson's and Wodrow's Hists., and Select. Biog., i.
- Dict. Nat. Biog.
