= John M'Clellan =

Scottish minister

- Church: Church of Scotland, Church of Ireland

Personal details
- Born: 1609
- Died: 1650 (aged 40–41)
- Denomination: Presbyterian
- Occupation: schoolmaster, minister
- Education: University of Glasgow

John M'Clellan (also spelled M'Lellan, M'Clelland, Mackleland, Makclellan, and Macleland; 1609–1650) was a seventeenth century teacher and minister. Educated in Scotland he started work as a schoolmaster at Newtownards. He also began to preach there initially with the sanction of the church. He took part in an unsuccessful attempt to sail to America on board the Eagle Wing in 1636. After this he returned to Scotland where he became a minister where he served from 1638 until his death in 1650.

== Life ==
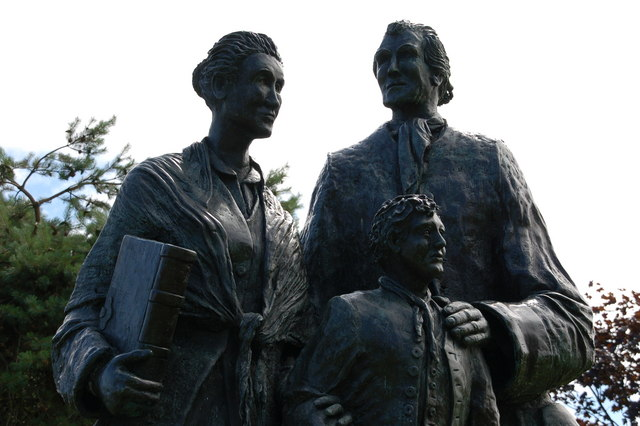
Emigrants memorial, Larne commemorating the first ship to leave Larne for America in 1717. The Eagle Wing left Groomsport in 1636 and was over half way there when they turned back. (The Mayflower sailed in 1620).

M'Clellan was born in Kirkcudbright in 1609. He was the son of Michael M'Clellan who was a burgess of Kirkcudbright. John was educated at University of Glasgow, graduating with an M.A. in 1629. After this he was employed as a schoolmaster at Newtownards, County Down. He was licensed to be a preacher in Ireland, but later deposed and excommunicated by the episcopalian authorities. Nevertheless he continued to preach, but being obliged to flee, returned to Scotland in 1638. In September 1636 he and other Scots and English puritans to the number of 140 sailed for New England in a ship called the Eagle Wing, which they had built for the purpose. They were chiefly Presbyterians, but some of them inclined to Independency and others to Brownism. Including M'Clellan here were four Scots ministers on board: Robert Blair, their leader, John Livingstone, James Hamilton, and John M'Clellan. Meeting with a great storm halfway across the Atlantic, they were obliged to put back, and returned to Lochfergus, where they had embarked nearly two months before. Returning to Scotland M'Clellan was admitted to the united parish of Kirkcudbright, Galtway and Dunrod in 1638. M'Clellan was a member of the General Assembly that year, and of the Commission for 1642, 1648, 1649. In 1642 and 1643. He was appointed to go to Ireland for periods of four and three months respectively. He declined the Professorship of Divinity at Edinburgh. He died in the early part of 1650.

== Family ==
He married

- (1) Marion, daughter of Bartholomew Fleming, merchant, Edinburgh, who died without issue about 1640
- (2) Isobel M'Clellan, who survived him, and married secondly, Thomas Hall, minister at Larne, Ireland

== Works ==
- Description of Galloway [in Latin] (Bleau's Atlas Scotice, 1662)
- A Letter to John, Lord Kirkcudbright . . . with a Sermon (1720)

== Bibliography ==
- War Committee of Kirkcudbright
- Reid's Ireland, i., ii., 42
- Stevenson's Hist.
- Baillie's Letters
- Acts of Pari., v.
- Murray's Hist, of Galloway
- G. R. Inhib., 8 July 1663
