= Jim Hamilton =

Jim Hamilton may refer to:

== People ==
- Jim Hamilton (baseball) (1922–1977), American baseball player
- Jim Hamilton (footballer, born 1966), Scottish footballer (Arbroath, Stirling Albion, Dumbarton)
- Jim Hamilton (footballer, born 1976), Scottish footballer (Heart of Midlothian, Aberdeen, Dundee United, Motherwell)
- Jim Hamilton (ice hockey) (born 1957), Canadian ice hockey player (Pittsburgh Penguins)
- Jim Hamilton (rugby union) (born 1982), Scottish rugby union player
- Jim Hamilton (politician), member of the Montana House of Representatives
- Jimmy Hamilton (1917–1994), American jazz musician
- Jimmy Hamilton (curler), Scottish curler
- Jimmy Hamilton (footballer, born 1904) (1904–?), English footballer
- Sunny Jim Hamilton (fl. 1911), American baseball player
- Jim Hamilton (runner), Scottish middle-distance runner

== Places ==
- Jim Hamilton–L.B. Owens Airport, an airport in South Carolina

== See also ==
- James Hamilton (disambiguation)
- Jamie Hamilton (disambiguation)
- Hamish Hamilton, Gaelic version of the name James Hamilton
