= Robert Humpston =

Robert Humpston may refer to:

- Robert Humpston (VC) (1832–1884), English recipient of the Victoria Cross
- Robert Humpston (bishop)
