= John Ridge (minister) =

English Puritan minister

John Ridge (c.1590–c.1637) was an English puritan minister, active in Ireland.

== Early life ==
Ridge was born at Oxford about 1590. He matriculated at St John's College, Oxford, on 16 June 1610, at the age of twenty, and graduated B.A. on 23 May 1612, having already been ordained deacon by John Bridges, bishop of Oxford. A nonconformist, he went over to Ireland, where he was probably ordained presbyter by Robert Echlin, bishop of Down and Connor. In 1619 he became vicar of Antrim. He built up his church (founded 1596), and gained a reputation as a preacher. He has been described as a Presbyterian, but Alexander Gordon writing in the Dictionary of National Biography disagrees.

== Six Mile Water revival ==
About 1626 Hugh Campbell, a layman from Ayrshire, established a meeting on the last Friday of each month at his house in Oldstone, two miles from Antrim. Crowds of people attended, encouraged by James Glendinning, the vicar of Carnmoney. To counter this, Ridge began a meeting for preaching and conference on the first Friday of each month at Antrim, and called in the aid of Robert Blair, Robert Cunningham of Holywood, Co. Down, and James Hamilton. This was the origin of the Antrim meeting, an advisory body claiming no jurisdiction. According to Alexander Gordon, it was influential, and furnished the model of the Worcestershire agreement framed by Richard Baxter in 1652, and adopted in numerous English counties in place of the parliamentary presbyterianism; and through John Howe, a member of the Antrim meeting (1671-5) became the parent of the county unions formed among English dissenters after the passing of the Toleration Act 1688. The fame of the meeting brought to Antrim, about 1628, a company of English separatists and an Arminian, John Freeman, but they were unsuccessful in making proselytes.

Ridge was one of the five beneficed clergy who, at the primary visitation of Bishop Henry Leslie at Lisburn in July 1636, refused to subscribe to the new canons, which were to assimilate the doctrine and ceremonies of the Irish church to those of England. The private conference which followed went unrecorded; in the public disputation with Leslie at Belfast (on 11 August) Ridge took no part, but when called up for sentence on 12 August he admitted that Leslie had given the five non-subscribers a fair, though not a full, hearing. Leslie thought his scruples arose from a melancholy temperament. He condemned him to 'perpetual silence within his diocese', and Ridge, along with Hamilton and Cunningham, was suspended from his post, due to their refusing to follow church episcopy.

Alexander Gordon asserts that there had been no actual presbyterianism in Ireland to this point, and the question of the form of church government had not been seriously raised, and that was Leslie's action, prompted by John Bramhall, that laid the foundation of a revolt against episcopal authority.

== Later life ==
The following year, he, Cunningham and Blair returned to Scotland, where David Dickson welcomed them and appointed them to preach in Irvine. Here Ridge is believed to have died in 1637, but there is no record of his death or burial.

== Family ==
He was married, and had several daughters. One of his daughters, Susannah (d. 19 April 1693), was married on 30 September 1643 to Samuel Heathcote of Derby, and had ten children; the descendants of her eldest son, Samuel, are numerous.
