= John Todd (bishop) =

Irish bishop

John Todd, D.D. was an Anglican bishop in the early seventeenth century.

A former Jesuit, he was appointed Dean of Cashel early in 1606. He was appointed Bishop of Down and Connor in 1607; and held this see until he was deprived in 1612.

Church of Ireland titles
Preceded by Dermot O’Meara	Dean of Cashel; 1606–1607	Succeeded by Lewis Jones
Preceded by Robert Humpsdon	Bishop of Down and Connor; 1607–1612	Succeeded by James Dundas
