= Robert Cunningham (minister) =

Presbyterian minister

- Church: Church of Scotland, Church of Ireland

Personal details
- Died: 29 March 1637 Irvine
- Denomination: Presbyterian
- Occupation: minister

Robert Cunningham (died 29 March 1637) was one of the early Scots ministers who settled in Ulster in the 17th century. He was the first Presbyterian minister in Holywood and was one of Samuel Rutherford's correspondents. He was deposed for his adherence to Presbyterian principles.

== Life ==
Robert Cunningham or Cunninghame was at first preacher for a while to the Earl of Buccleuch's regiment in Holland, but afterwards became minister at Holywood, in the North of Ireland. He was brought to Ulster by James Hamilton as were his fellow ministers John Livingstone and Robert Blair. Livingstone came after being urged by Cunningham. Cunningham was one of the first Scots ministers in County Down. He came to Ireland on the return of the troops to Scotland, and was, on the 9th of November 1615, admitted to the ministry by Robert Echlin, the Bishop of Down and Connor. He was returned on the diocesan roll, in 1622, as curate of Holywood and Craigavad, and as maintained in this office by a stipend from Sir James Hamilton who had been ennobled by the title of Lord Claneboy.

In 1625/26, he, Blair, Hamilton and John Ridge began preaching in Antrim; this led to the Six Mile Water Revival.

On the 11/12 August 1636, he, along with Hamilton and Ridge, was suspended from his post by Henry Leslie, Bishop of Down due to their refusing to follow church episcopy. The following year, he, Ridge and Blair returned to Scotland and preached in Irvine; he died there a few months later.

== Family ==
He married Isabel Montgomerie, one of Sir Hugh Montgomery's daughters. He married Janet Kennedy. He and Janet had three sons, James, John and Robert.

He had a daughter, Isabella (died 8 November 1703, aged 70), who married John Law, and had issue - William, professor of moral philosophy in the University of Edinburgh, founder of the family of Law of Elvingston, East Lothian.

== Death and posthumous fines ==
His epitaph was written by Robert Blair:

Hic Cunninghami recubat Roberti
Corpus. O qualis genius latebat,
Quamque divinus fragili iuvolutus,
Pulvere in isto !
Acrius nemo intonuit superbis;
Nemo dejectos magis erigebat;
Sed Dei laudes celebrando, vicit
Seque aliosque.

Some weeks after Cunningham's death he was cited to appear in court and being deceased did not appear and was fined. His widow and eight children had their goods seized to pay the fine.
