= Eugenia (Lady of Quality) =

Pseudonym of an English pamphleteer from the early 1700s

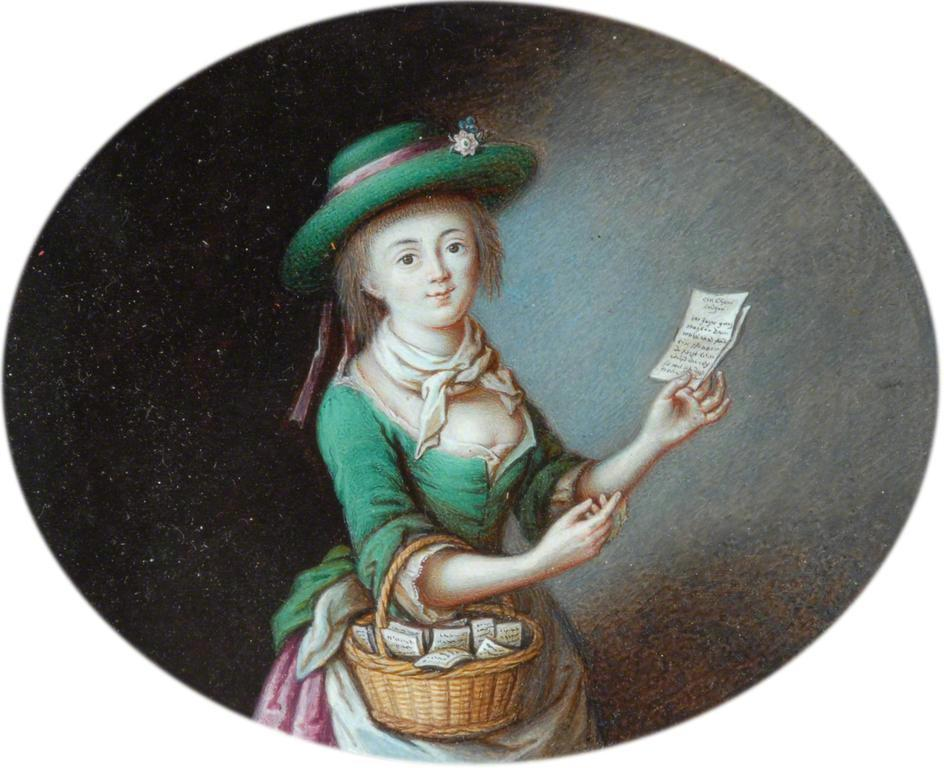
A girl holding pamphlets

Eugenia was the pseudonym used by an unknown English pamphleteer of the early 18th century. She became known for a social riposte entitled The Female Advocate: Or, a plea for the just liberty of the tender sex, and particularly of married women. Being reflections on a late rude and disingenuous discourse, delivered by Mr. John Sprint, in a sermon at a wedding... at Sherburn... By a Lady of Quality (London, 1700).

== Sharp riposte ==
The Female Advocate (another edition is entitled The Female Preacher) was a powerful protofeminist response to the sermon by Rev. John Sprint entitled The Bride-Woman's Counsellor (1699). Sprint, who may have been a descendant of the more famous theologian John Sprint (died 1623), had preached the offending sermon at a wedding in Sherborne, Dorset on 11 May 1699.

The Female Advocate was addressed to "To the Honourable The Lady W—ley" and published in 1700 by the same firm that had issued The Bride-Woman's Counsellor itself. Its author signed herself, "Your Ladiship's most obliged and most humble Servant, Eugenia."

== Unknown identity ==
Some commentators at the time when the pamphlet was published thought that Eugenia was male. Meanwhile some readers of the essayist Mary Chudleigh were ascribing the work to her. The latter seems unlikely, as the Eugenia of The Female Advocate takes a sharply edged, prose approach, unlike the lightheartedness of Chudleigh's own. Furthermore, Chudleigh's Poems (1703) include praise for Eugenia's "ingenious Pen".

Eugenia declares at the outset of her work, "If you inquire who I am, I shall only tell you in general, that I am one that never yet came within the Clutches of a Husband; and therefore what I write may be the more favourably interpreted as not coming from a Party concern'd." It is clear from the work that she knows some Latin and Greek and a little about the world. She states that not even in Italy and Spain do men demand of their wives "a Slavery so abject as this [Sprint] would fain persuade us to."

== External link ==
- The full text of the work is available at Early English Books Retrieved 29 July 2026
