= John Law (minister) =

Scottish Presbyterian minister

The Reverend John Law
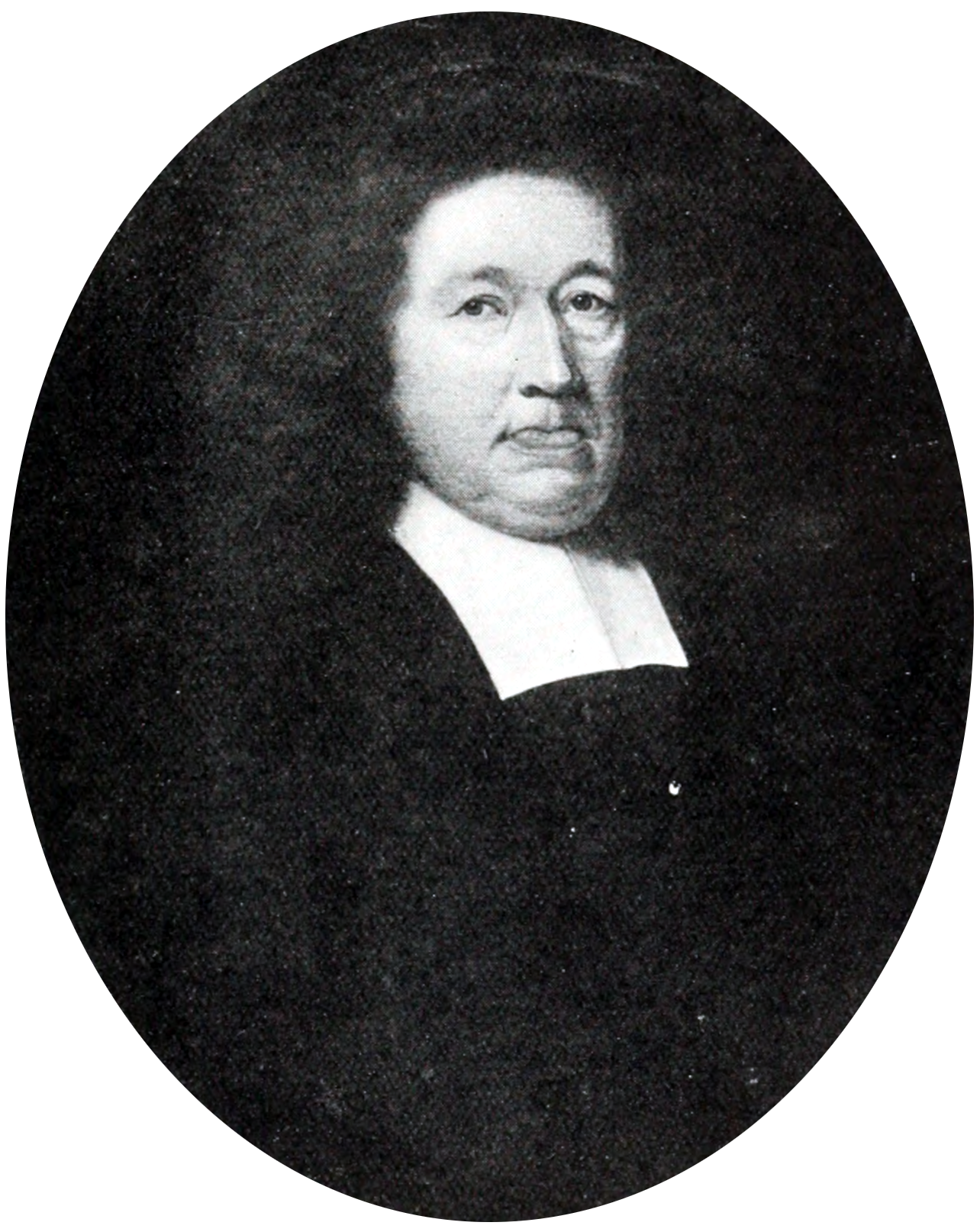
- John Law
- Church: Church of Scotland

Personal details
- Born: 1632 Inchinnan
- Died: 26 December 1712 Edinburgh
- Buried: Greyfriars Kirkyard
- Denomination: Presbyterian
- Education: University of Glasgow

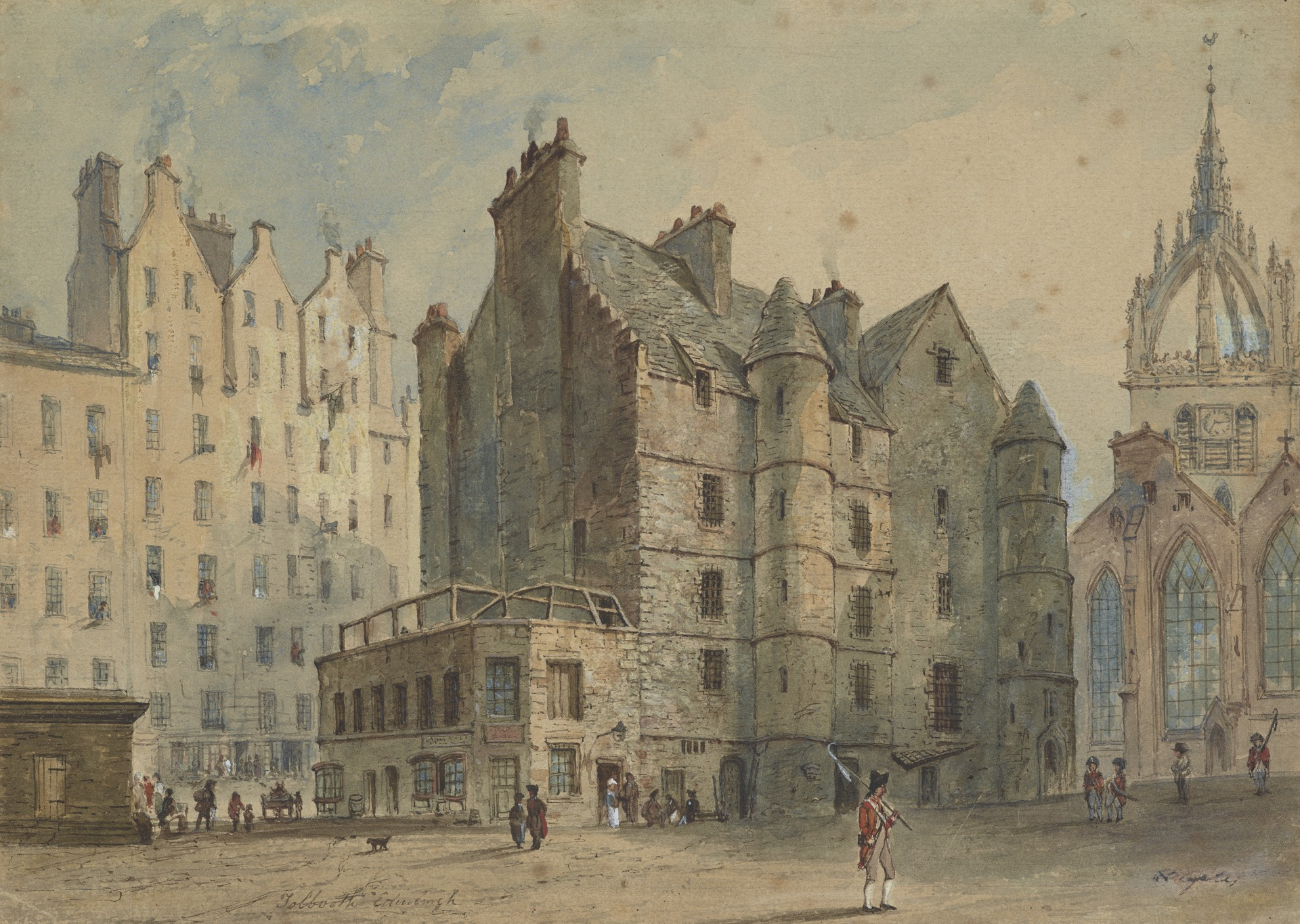
The Tolbooth (a Covenanting prison) and St. Giles Cathedral, Edinburgh

John Law (1632–1712) was a 17th-century Presbyterian minister from Scotland. He became Moderator of the General Assembly in 1694 and later was a prisoner on the Bass Rock.

== Life ==
Law was born in 1632, the son of Thomas Law, minister of Inchinnan. Like John Spreul John began life training as an apothecary. He graduated with an M.A. from the University of Glasgow in 1653. He was ordained to be the minister of Campsie in 1656. He was deprived of this charge in 1662 but later restored in 1678. He was again deprived on account of the Test in 1681. He was called to the High Church of Edinburgh (St Giles Cathedral) on 22 July 1689. He was appointed to the charge 20 April 1692 and confirmed by the town council 24 July 1689. He was a member of the General Assemblies in 1690 and 1692 and was elected Moderator in 1694. He was appointed Almoner to the King on 2 October 1700 (P. S. Reg. Eng., v., 390). He retired on 26 November 1707 and died on 26 December 1712.

He was imprisoned on the Bass Rock from April 1679 until July 1679. His brother was the minister of East Kilpatrick.

== Early ministry ==
He was ordained by the Protesters to be minister of Campsie in 1656. He was deprived by an Act of Parliament on 11 June, and Decreet of Privy Council 1 October 1662. Law for the next eight years conducted conventicles — often at great risk to himself — in the west of Stirlingshire, about Kippen, Gargunnock, and Menteith. Under the "Indulgence Act" he was allowed to exercise the functions of the ministry in the parish of Irvine in 1672, but declined, and as he did not appear before the council when called, 12 March 1673, they ordered his apprehension, 4 June 1674. However, he did not confine himself to these parts; and, accordingly, a warrant was issued for his apprehension. He was accused at the Diocesan Synod, 22 October, of holding conventicles at Kippen. Captured and taken to the Tolbooth of Edinburgh, Law was brought before "My Lords" but discharged upon a security of five thousand merks to "live orderly "; or, in default thereof, to be treated as a "seditious" person. This was in 1674. But he was no sooner set at liberty than he entered again into all the enthusiasm of conventicles and managed, for five years, to elude the state's control. He was put to the horn on 7 December 1676.

A meeting-house built for him in the parish in 1678 was demolished by order of the council. About the beginning of 1679 he was arrested, in the house of the laird of Kincaid, while on his way to visit his dying wife. (Mrs. Law seems to have recovered from her dangerous illness at that time, as the date of her death, marked on the tombstone in Old Greyfriars, was 8 November 1703.) He was sent prisoner to the Bass Rock in 1679, for "invading several pulpits and presuming to ordain persons to the ministry" but was released after three months on finding caution to appear when called and under a bond of one thousand merks. He was deprived in 1681, probably on account of the Test was restored by Act of Parliament 25 April 1690, but having been called to the High Kirk, Edinburgh, accepted that charge.

== After the Revolutionary Settlement ==
After the Revolution he became minister of the St. Giles', Edinburgh.

Law died in December 1712, at the advanced age of eighty years, and was buried in Greyfriars Kirkyard. His Wife, Isabella Cunninghame, "noted for true holiness," was interred in the same place, on 8 November 1703, in her 70th year. The grave lies on the east wall and is the first vault north of the main entrance.

== Family life ==
He married Isabella (died 8 November 1703, aged 70), who was the daughter of Robert Cunningham, minister of Holywood, Ireland, and had issue — William, professor of moral philosophy in the University of Edinburgh, founder of the family of Law of Elvingston, East Lothian.

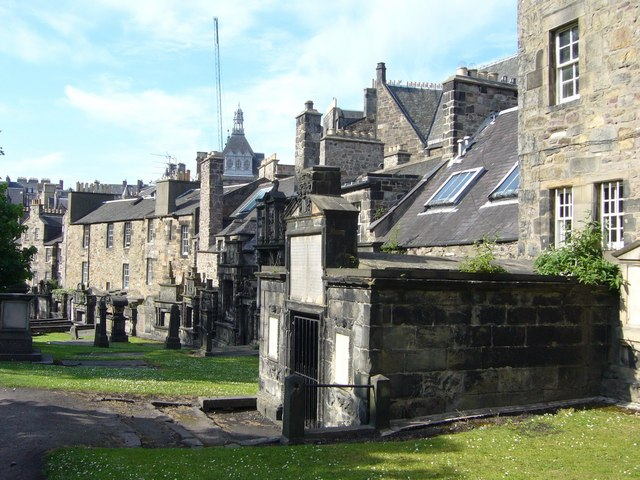
John Law's vault

William built a tomb for his parents in Greyfriars Kirkyard. The inscription reads:

Memoriae optimorum parentum, D. Joannis Law, ecclesiae apud Edinensis pastoris prudentissimi, vigilantis- simi, purioris religionis studio & pietate non fucata insignis; et Isabella Cuninghame, conjugis amantissimae, vera sanctitate & placidi ac sedati animi ornamento conspicuae; qui mortalitatem exuerunt, ad immortalis vitae gaudia nitentes; ille 26 die Decembris, anno Dom. 1712, aetatis suae 80; haec 8 die Novembris, anno Dom. 1703, aetatis suae 70; hoc monumentum sacrum esse voluit Gulielmus Law, filius.

To the memory of his most excellent parents, Mr John Law, a most prudent and vigilant pastor of the Church at Edinburgh, distinguished by his zeal for pure religion, and his unfeigned piety; and Isabella Cuninghame, his affectionate wife, noted for true holiness, and the ornament of a meek and quiet spirit, who, pressing towards the joys of eternal life, laid aside mortality, — the former on the 26th December A.d. 1712, in his 80th year; the latter on the 8th November A.d. 1703, in her 70th year,— this monument was dedicated by William Law, their son. — M.]

== Bibliography ==
- Edin. Counc, Guild, Reg. (Bur.);
- Tombst.;
- Monteith's Mort., ii.;
- Wodrow's Anal., iii.;
- Peterkin's Const.
- Leven and Melv. Pap.
