= John Sprint =

English clergyman and theologian

John Sprint (died 1623) was an English clergyman and theologian, as well as a writer in favor of conformity, despite earlier Puritan views that had led him into conflict with the authorities.

== Life ==
His grandfather John Sprint was an apothecary in Gloucestershire; his father, also John Sprint (d. 1590), was appointed dean of Bristol in 1571, archdeacon of Wiltshire 1578, and treasurer of Salisbury Cathedral in 1584.

John Sprint the younger was born in or near Bristol, and was elected a student of Christ Church, Oxford in 1592. He graduated B.A. on 6 March 1596, and earned his M.A. on 21 May 1599. Having been ordained, he attached himself to the puritan party, and took occasion, when preaching at the university church, to inveigh strongly against the ceremonies and discipline of the English church. On being called to account by John Howson, the vice-chancellor, he defied his authority, and was sent to prison. The matter was referred to the queen and council; a commission was appointed, and Sprint was compelled to read his submission in convocation.

In 1610 Sprint was appointed vicar of Thornbury in Gloucestershire, where he continued for some time to hold views adverse to those of the established church; but he was induced to conform by the persuasion of Samuel Burton, archdeacon of Gloucester. Sprint died in 1623, and was buried in St. Anne's, Blackfriars, leaving two sons, John (d. 1692) and Samuel. Both took holy orders, and were among the ejected ministers of 1662, John being ejected from the living of Hampstead, Middlesex, and Samuel from that of South Tidworth, Hampshire.

== Works ==
He published Cassander Anglicanus: shewing the necessity of conformity to the prescribed Ceremonies of our Church in Case of Deprivation (London, 1618), which had considerable effect on beneficed clergy of puritan tendencies. It provoked an anonymous reply entitled A brief and plain Answer to Master Sprints discourse, to which Sprint made a rejoinder entitled A Reply to the answer of my first Reason. Both are printed with the 1618 edition of Cassander Anglicanus. In his defense of conformity Sprint argues that the rites are non-essential, and that no minister of the gospel is justified in abandoning his ministry because they are enjoined upon him. James Ussher argued in this way to Robert Blair; Blair countered with points made by James Sempill in his reply Cassander Scotiana to Cassander Anglicanus.

He was the author of:

- Propositions tending to prove the necessary Use of the Christian Sabbath or Lord's Day, London, 1607, and The Practice of that Sacred Day, framed after the Rules of God's Word, printed with the former. These works supported strict Sabbatarian views.
- The Summe of Christian Religion by way of Question and Answer, London, 1613.
- The Christian's Sword and Buckler; or a Letter sent to a Man grievously afflicted in Conscience and fearfully troubled in Mind, London, 1638; 10th ed. 1650.

To Sprint is also ascribed A true, modest, and just Defence of the Petition for Reformation exhibited to the King's Majestie. Containing an Answere to the Confutation published under the Names of some of the Universitie of Oxford, 1618. Some early verses of his are prefixed to Thomas Storer's Life and Death of Wolsey, 1599.

== See also ==
- Eugenia (Lady of Quality)

== Sources ==
- This article incorporates text from a publication now in the public domain: "Sprint, John". Dictionary of National Biography. London: Smith, Elder & Co. 1885–1900.
