= Couston Castle =

Coordinates: 56.0506°N 3.3373°W

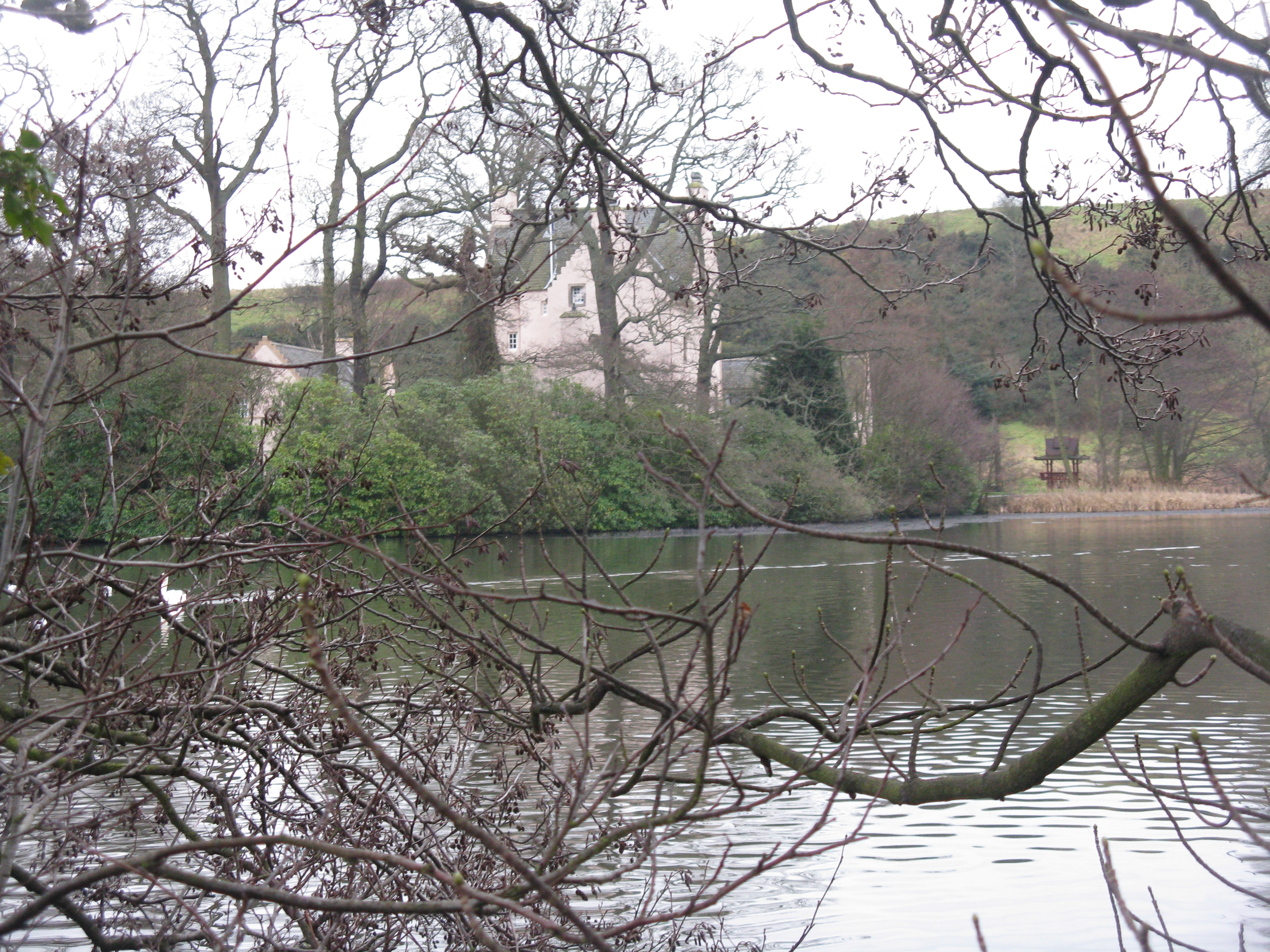
- Interactive map of the Couston Castle area

General information
- Location: Fife, Dalgety Bay, Scotland
- Completed: 16th or early 17th century

Couston Castle is an L-plan tower house dating from the late sixteenth or early seventeenth centuries, just north east of Dalgety Bay, at the edge of Otterston Loch in Fife, Scotland. It is built on the site of an earlier building.

== History ==
Couston Castle was built on lands granted to Robert de London, an illegitimate son of King William the Lion (1143–1214) in 1199. The land was granted in turn to Roger Frebern.

The castle was firstly the property of the Logans of Restalrig, but passed later to the Earls of Moray. By the sixteenth century there was a fortified castle protected by artillery. King James V confirmed a charter to James Logan of Couston, whose family were resident at that period, during which the castle was remodelled to the form that it generally now has. For part of the second half of the seventeenth century it was occupied by Robert Blair, a Presbyterian clergyman, who was a former tutor of King Charles I, and who died there in 1666.

The north wing is thought to date from the eighteenth century. The castle was in reasonable condition until the 1830s, when the greater part of the south end was demolished to provide stones used in building farm buildings. The castle was purchased by a Dunfermline businessman, Alastair Harper, in 1980, and he set about its restoration. After having been derelict for many years, the castle was restored by architect Ian Begg in 1985, who converted it into a family home. In 2002 further refurbishments and extensions were finished.
