= Thomas Storer =

English poet and mathematician

Thomas Storer (c. 1571 – 1604) was an English poet and mathematician. His major work was the Life and Death of Cardinal Wolsey.

== Life ==
He was the son of John Storer of London. He was elected a student of Christ Church, Oxford, in 1587, and graduated B.A. on 27 March 1591, M.A. on 13 May 1604. He died in London in November 1604, and was buried in the church of St Michael Bassishaw.

== Works ==
In 1599 appeared The Life and Death of Thomas Wolsey, cardinall. … By Thomas Storer, student of Christ Church in Oxford. At London printed by Thomas Dawson. The poem is written on the model of Thomas Churchyard's legend on the history of Wolsey in The Mirrour for Magistrates. It consists of three parts, "Wolseius aspirans", "Wolseius triumphans", and "Wolseius moriens"; these contain respectively 101, 89, and 51 seven-line stanzas of decasyllabic verse (rhyming ababbcc, as in rhyme royal). The volume is dedicated to John Howson, Queen Elizabeth's chaplain, and there are introductory verses by Charles Fitzgeffrey and Thomas and Edward Michelborne, and a poem in fifteen eight-line stanzas addressed to the author by his fellow-collegian John Sprint. The poem is based on the narratives of George Cavendish (Life of Woolsey) and Raphael Holinshed, and contains a felicitous characterisation of Richard Foxe. It was praised by Alberic Gentilis in his Laudes Academiæ Perusinæ et Oxoniensis (1605). The Life was reprinted in Thomas Park's Heliconia (1815, vol. ii.), and reissued separately in 1826 from the press of David Alphonso Talboys at Oxford. This poem was brought up as a possible influence on Shakespeare's composition of the play Henry VIII, from the end of the 18th century onwards.

In England's Parnassus (1600) are about 20 poems by Storer; they are derived from the Life of Wolsey, and display an elaborate style of metaphor. Some verses by Storer are prefixed to Sir William Vaughan's Golden Grove (1600).

== Notes ==
Attribution

This article incorporates text from a publication now in the public domain: "Storer, Thomas". Dictionary of National Biography. London: Smith, Elder & Co. 1885–1900.
