= James Dundas (bishop) =

Irish Anglican bishop

James Dundas, D.D. was an Anglican bishop in the early seventeenth century.

A Scot, described as a Professor of Divinity, he was appointed Bishop of Down and Connor in 1612; and held this See until he was deprived a year later. His successor Robert Echlin complained bitterly of the damage he had done to the financial position of the diocese, even in such a short space of time: as a result, a Commission of Inquiry was set up to ascertain the loss of revenue and propose remedies.

Church of Ireland titles
Preceded by John Todd	Bishop of Down and Connor; 1612–1613	Succeeded by Robert Echlin
