= Robert Humpston (bishop) =

Irish Anglican bishop

Robert Humston, D.D. was an Anglican bishop in the early seventeenth century.

An Englishman, he was Rector of Barton, Cheshire before coming over to Ireland. He was appointed Bishop of Down and Connor in 1602 and served for four years, prior to his death in late 1606.

Commissioned construction of Kilroot House, Country Antrim, during the early 17th-century.

Church of Ireland titles
Preceded by John Chardon	Bishop of Down and Connor; 1602–1606	Succeeded by John Todd
