= Six Mile Water =

River in Northern Ireland

Coordinates: 54.71788°N 6.23122°W

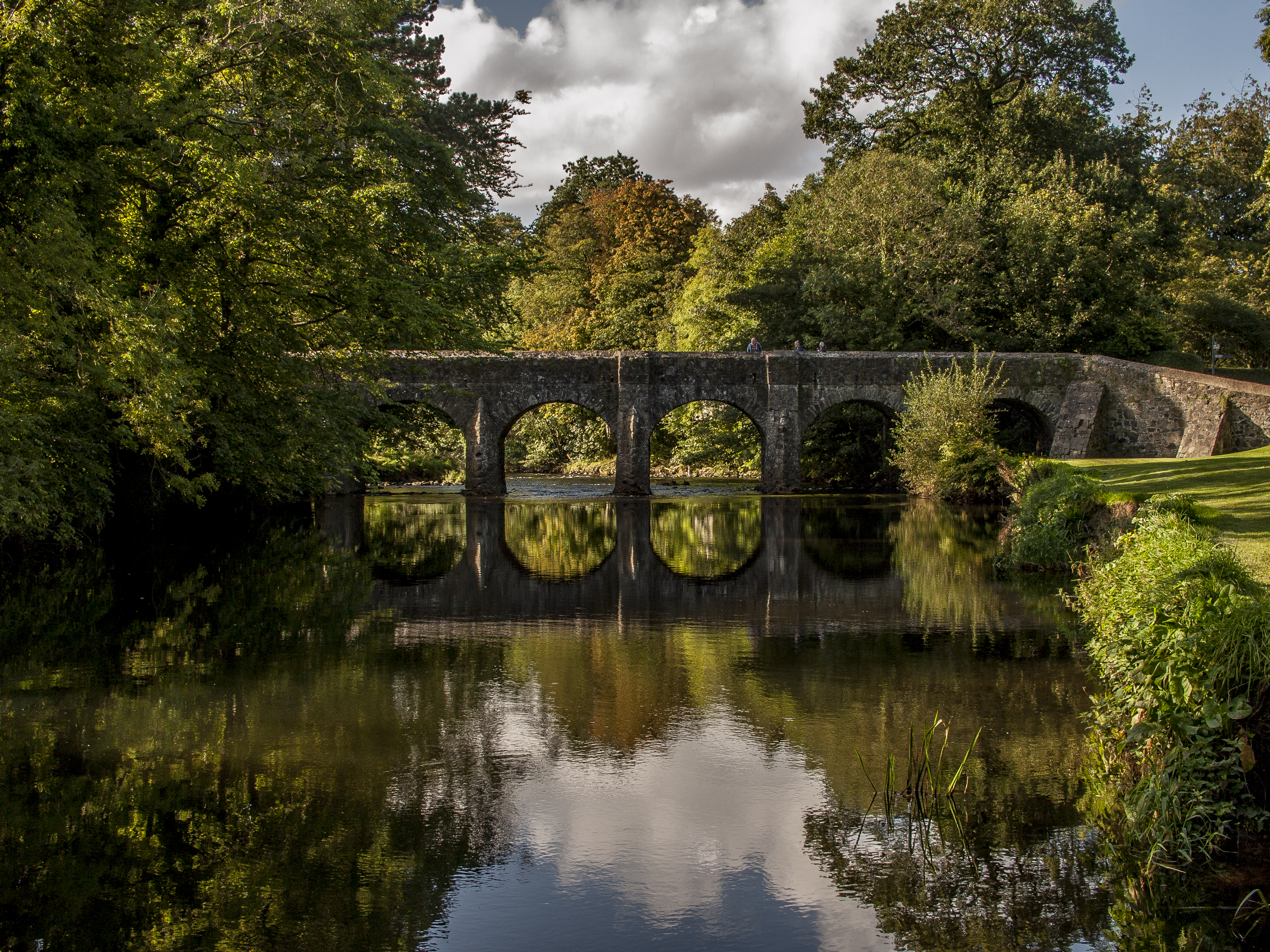
A bridge over the Six Mile Water in the grounds of Antrim Castle

The Six Mile Water is a river in southern County Antrim, Northern Ireland. It is an indirect tributary of the River Bann, via Lough Neagh.

== Name ==
The river was historically called the Ollarbha and is known in Irish as Abhainn na bhFiodh ("river of the woods"), which was anglicised as 'Owenaview'.

Accounts vary as to the origin of the name. The river is almost 26 miles (42 km) long rather than six. It is said to be named from a crossing point six Irish miles from Antrim, on the road to Carrickfergus. Another story is that it was named by English soldiers, who calculated that it was a six-mile march from Carrickfergus Castle to the ford at Ballyclare.

== Course and catchment ==
It rises in the hills west of Larne and north of Carrickfergus and descends gently westward, flowing through or close to the communities of Ballynure, Ballyclare, Doagh, Parkgate, Templepatrick, Dunadry and Antrim into Lough Neagh. A weir exists at Ballyclare where water was diverted to the paper mill. The Six Mile Water Park was constructed around the river in Ballyclare, in order that the river's frequent floods would not affect houses in the area. It has a catchment of 117 square miles.

== Culture ==
The river is the subject of the song "Six Mile Water", by the alternative rock band Therapy?. It appeared on their fifth full-length album Suicide Pact – You First released in 1999.

== History ==
The area is known as the site of the religious 'Six Mile Water Revival' of 1625. The revival began with the preaching of James Glendinning at Oldstone, and his successor Josias Welsh (grandson of John Knox). Other preachers such as Robert Blair, James Hamilton and John Ridge were also involved. The Christian revival soon spread through counties Antrim and Down and lasted for almost ten years.

== See also ==
- List of rivers of Ireland
