= Dermot O'Meara =

Dermot O’Meara was Dean of Cashel from 1605 until 1606: a former Roman Catholic, he returned to that faith when Chapter and Crown both nominated alternative candidates to succeed him.
