= Groomsport =

Village near Bangor, County Down, Northern Ireland

Coordinates: 54.667°N 5.617°W

Groomsport: Irish: Port an Ghiolla Ghruama
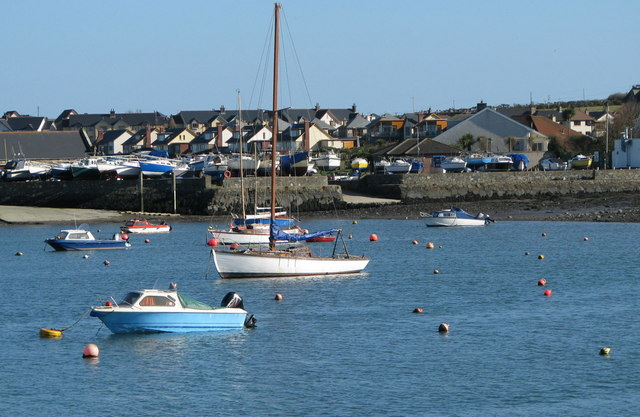
- Groomsport harbour, March 2008

- Location within County Down
- Population: 1,220 (2021 Census)
- District: Ards and North Down Borough
- County: County Down
- Country: Northern Ireland
- Sovereign state: United Kingdom
- Post town: BANGOR
- Postcode district: BT19
- Dialling code: 028
- UK Parliament: North Down
- Website: discovergroomsport.com

Groomsport (from Irish Port an Ghiolla Ghruama 'port of the gloomy servant') is a village and townland near Bangor in County Down, Northern Ireland. It is on the south shore of Belfast Lough and on the north coast of the Ards Peninsula. Groomsport has a population of 1,220 people according to the 2021 census. It is part of the Ards and North Down Borough.

Groomsport is a dormitory seaside and holiday village. Originally it was a small fishing village with the focus of development being the harbour and Main Street. Groomsport has developed as a centre for water and shore-based recreation with improved facilities for activities such as sailing and power boating. The Cockle Island Boat Club has its home here in the boat house on the pier.

The village developed beside the natural sheltered harbour, between the shore, Ballymacormick Point and the rocky outcrop known as Cockle Island. The harbour is reputed to be of Viking origin and the beginnings of the small settlement can be traced to the 9th or 10th century. Groomsport remained a fishing village through the Victorian and Edwardian periods until the 1920s. Groomsport still retains the identity and character of a small harbour village with its pier and sheltered anchorage together with its historic street pattern.

== History ==
The village and townland derives its name from the Irish Port an Ghiolla Ghruama which could be rendered as Gloomfellow Port. This has historically been anglicised or half-anglicised as Portgillegroome, Gillgroomsport and Gilgroomsport. By the 17th century, before Donaghadee became the main port for embarkation for Scotland, Groomsport's harbour was significant enough to have its own Customs House. Indeed, Groomsport narrowly missed out on New World fame when the ship Eagle Wing set out from the port, with 140 men, women and children, to attempt an early trip to North America in 1636 only to be defeated by bad weather after eight weeks at sea. Robert Blair and John Livingstone both wrote about the voyage.

By the mid-19th century Groomsport had a relatively large fishing fleet and housed a lifeboat station in its sheltered bay. The population of the village was employed mainly in agriculture, fishing and loom weaving. Whilst living conditions were hard, the coming of the railway from Holywood to Bangor in 1865 made the village much more accessible, the standard of living improved, and it became a popular destination for visitors. Groomsport had a halt on the Newtownards to Donaghadee line, which opened in 1861, but this was several miles south of the village and was renamed Groomsport Road; that line closed in 1950.

The population was only 360 in the 1951 Census but this increased substantially by the early 21st century with the construction of new housing developments. The harbour is used by Cockle Island Boat Club and contains a number of pleasure craft. Two former fishermen's cottages by the harbour have been restored as an attraction for visitors.

== Demographics ==
Groomsport is classified as a settlement within Belfast Metropolitan Urban Area (BMUA) by the Northern Ireland Statistics and Research Agency (NISRA).

As of the 2011 census, for which census day was 27 March 2011, the usually resident population of Groomsport Ward was 3,005. As of this census, the demographic characteristics of the people living in Groomsport indicated that:

- 11.95% were aged under 16 years and 29.58% were aged 65 and over;
- 47.99% of the usually resident population were male and 52.01% were female; and 53 years was the average (median) age of the population.
- 98.90% were from the white (including Irish Traveller) ethnic group;
- 7.59% belong to or were brought up in the Catholic religion and 82.90% belong to or were brought up in a 'Protestant and Other Christian (including Christian related)' religion; and 75.14% indicated that they had a British national identity, 7.19% had an Irish national identity and 34.11% had a Northern Irish national identity*.
- of those, aged 3 years old and over, 2.31% had some knowledge of Irish, 10.58% had some knowledge of Ulster-Scots, and 0.85% did not have English as their first language.

== Sports ==
Local sports clubs include Groomsport F.C., who play in the Northern Amateur Football League.

== See also ==
- List of villages in Northern Ireland
- List of towns in Northern Ireland
