= Jimmy Hamilton (footballer, born 1906) =

Scottish footballer

Personal information
- Date of birth: 16 August 1906
- Place of birth: New Cumnock
- Height: 5 ft 11 in (1.80 m)
- Position: Full back

Senior career*
Years	Team	Apps	(Gls)
- Girvan Juniors
- Hamilton Academical
- Ayr United
1931–1932	Rochdale	77	(0)
1932–1938	Wrexham	163	(1)
1938	Carlisle United	23	(0)
1939	Chester City	0	(0)
Total		263	(1)
- * Club domestic league appearances and goals

James Hamilton (born 16 August 1906) was a Scottish professional footballer who played for Girvan Juniors, Hamilton Academical, Ayr United, Rochdale, Wrexham, Carlisle United and Chester City, as a full back.
