= Jamie Hamilton =

Jamie Hamilton may refer to:

- Jamie Hamilton (publisher) (1900–1988), British book publisher, rower and Olympic medalist
- Jamie Hamilton (motorcyclist) (born 1991), Northern Irish motorcycle racer
- Jamie Lee Hamilton (1955–2019), Canadian politician
- Jamie Hamilton, a character in the television series Galactica 1980
- Jamie Hamilton (rugby union) (born 1970), English rugby union player
- Jamie Hamilton (footballer) (born 2002), Scottish footballer

== See also ==
- James Hamilton (disambiguation)
