= Jimmy Hamilton (footballer, born 1954) =

Scottish footballer

Personal information
- Full name: James Hamilton
- Date of birth: 14 June 1954 (age 72)
- Place of birth: Baillieston, Scotland
- Height: 5 ft 11 in (1.80 m)
- Position: Midfielder

Youth career
- West Bromwich Albion
- Coatbridge Juniors

Senior career*
Years	Team	Apps	(Gls)
1972–1975	Sunderland	17	(2)
1975–1976	Plymouth Argyle	8	(0)
1976–1977	Bristol Rovers	20	(1)
1977–1981	Carlisle United	154	(12)
1981–1982	Morton		
1982	Newcastle KB United	15	(3)
1982	Gretna		
1982–1984	Hartlepools United	3	(0)
1984	Gretna		
1984–1985	Queen of the South		
1985–1986	APIA Leichhardt	15	(0)
1986	Canberra City	13	(0)
- * Club domestic league appearances and goals

James Hamilton (born 14 June 1954) is a Scottish former professional footballer who played as a midfielder for Sunderland.
