= Jimmy Hamilton (footballer, born 1904) =

English footballer and manager

Personal information
- Date of birth: 1904
- Place of birth: Hetton-le-Hole, England
- Height: 5 ft 11 in (1.80 m)
- Position: Half-back

Senior career*
Years	Team	Apps	(Gls)
1922–1931	Crystal Palace	180	(4)
1931–1933	Hartlepools United	49	(?)
1933–1935	Gateshead	?	(?)

Managerial career
- ?–1935: Gateshead (Player-coach)
- 1935–1940: Hartlepools United
- * Club domestic league appearances and goals

James Hamilton (born 1904 Hetton-le-Hole, County Durham – died post 1939) was an English professional footballer who played as a half-back for Crystal Palace, Gateshead and Hartlepools United. He also managed Hartlepools United.

== Playing career ==
Hamilton was in London, serving with the Coldstream Guards, when he had a successful trial with Crystal Palace in 1922. He signed for the club in December that year and made his debut the following October against Bradford City. He was a regular in the team over the following eight seasons making a total of 180 league appearances, scoring four goals. In 1931 he moved to Hartlepools United where he captained the side and made 49 appearances, before moving to Gateshead in 1933 where he served as player-coach. In 1935 he returned to Hartlepools United, as manager, a post he held up until the Second World War.

Hamilton also represented the Army at boxing.
