= Robert Echlin (bishop) =

Scots-born clergyman

Robert Echlin (1576 – 17 July 1635) was a Scots-born clergyman who was the Church of Ireland Bishop of Down and Connor from 1612 to 1635. He obtained his Presbytery Degree from the University of St Andrews in Scotland and was made Minister for Inverkeithing.

== Life ==
He was the youngest son of Henry Echlin (1546- ?), laird of Pittrado, and his wife Grizel Colville of Kinross (1541–1607), and was born at Pittrado, Fife in 1576. King James VI is said to have made Robert a bishop out of regard for the memory of his late father, whom he had known and respected.

As Bishop of Down and Connor Robert is remembered mainly for his fierce clash with the recently arrived Presbyterian clergy, who were all Scots like himself. Having at first welcomed them warmly into his diocese, and allowed them considerable latitude as regards their liturgical practices, he later became their bitter enemy, and suspended two of them, Robert Blair and John Livingstone. They were quickly restored to office, due to the goodwill of James Ussher, Archbishop of Armagh, whose own religious beliefs were much closer to Presbyterianism than Echlin's, but Echlin remained their implacable enemy and finally had them deposed and excommunicated for nonconformity. They made an abortive effort to emigrate to New England, then returned to Scotland.

Robert worked hard to restore the finances of his diocese, which had suffered greatly from the mismanagement of his predecessor James Dundas, even though Dundas held the see for only one year. At his urging, the King appointed a Commission to inquire into the diocesan finances and make recommendations as to how to repair the damage.

There is a well-known story that the doctor who attended him in his final illness asked what ailed him. The Bishop with great difficulty replied "My conscience, sir!" The doctor replied that there is no cure for a guilty conscience.

He died at his palace, the Abbacy, Portaferry, and was buried at Templecraney, Portaferry in County Down. An account of Robert Echlin's life and background is given in an earlier book but some of this is claimed as inaccurate by J. R. Echlin's later work.

== Family ==
Echlin married Jane Seton, daughter of James Seton of Lathrisk, Fife in 1600 and had two sons and four daughters:

1. Margaret Echlin (1602-18 Nov 1684) m. Robert Maxwell of Kilbride, Archdeacon of Down and later Bishop of Kilmore. He was the ancestor of the Earls of Farnham.
2. Isabel Echlin (1604- ) m. Archibald Stewart of Ballintoy, co. Antrim.
3. Hugh Echlin (1606–1641) m. Magdalene Cowell. He was murdered in the Irish Rebellion of 1641 at Caledon Bridge with his son Robert and his servants.
4. Euphemia Echlin (1608- ) possibly married a Robert Echlin.
5. John Echlin (1612- ) m. Mary Stafford, 3rd daughter of Sir Francis Stafford of Mount Stafford, County Antrim and also of Bradney, Shropshire, England: he was the grandfather of Sir Henry Echlin, first of the Echlin baronets, and of Lieutenant General Robert Echlin.
6. Jane Echlin (1615–1646) m. 1. Rev. Henry Maxwell in 1640 and 2. Rev. William Fullerton, Archdeacon of Armagh.

The Colville family of Newtownards and Galgorm Castle were cousins of the Bishop through his mother.
