= Robert Blair (moderator) =

Scottish Presbyterian minister (1593–1666)

The Reverend Robert Blair
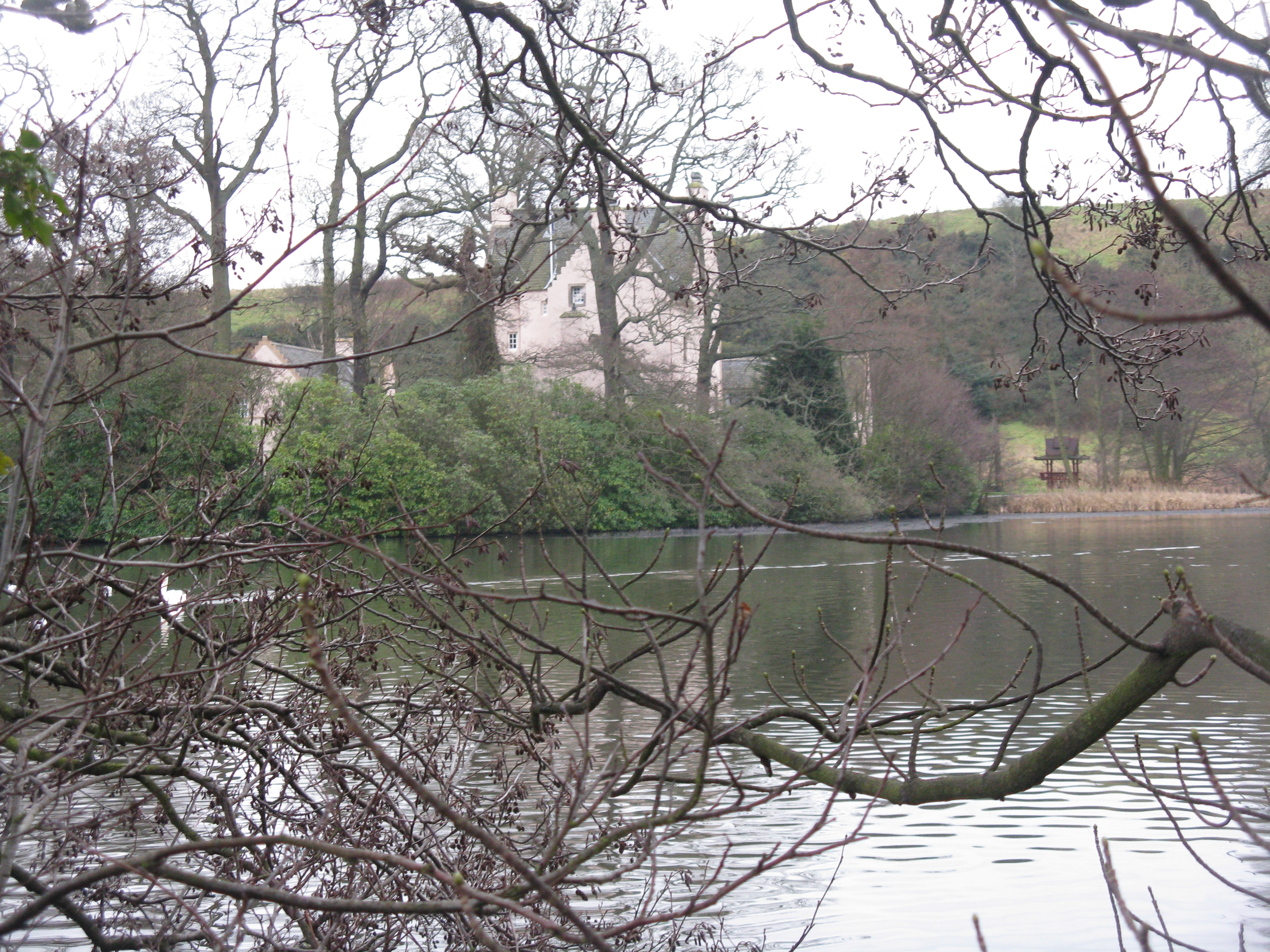
- Couston Castle where Robert Blair died.

Personal details
- Born: 1593 Irvine
- Died: 27 August 1666 Couston Castle
- Buried: Aberdour
- Denomination: Presbyterian
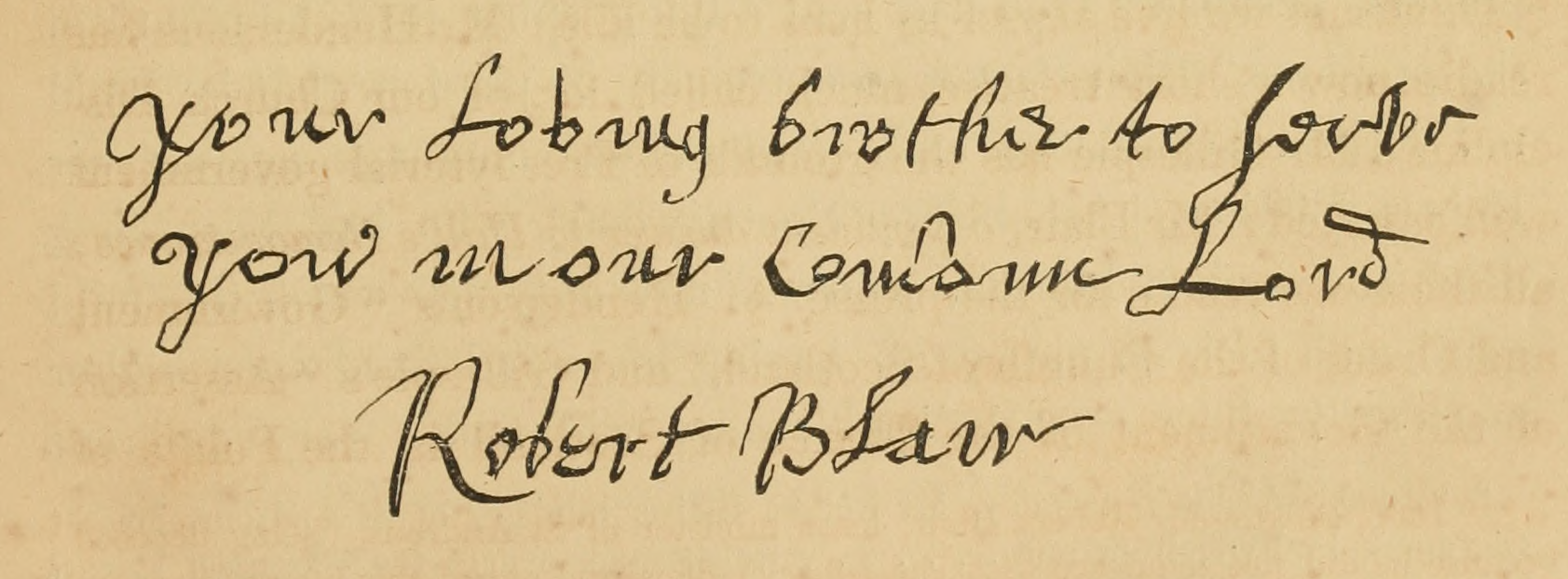
- Signature

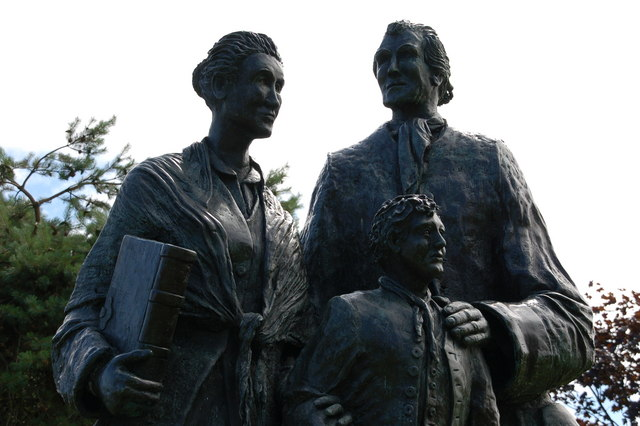
Emigrants memorial, Larne commemorating the first ship to leave Larne for America in 1717. The Eagle Wing left Groomsport in 1636 and was over halfway there when they turned back. (The Mayflower sailed in 1620).

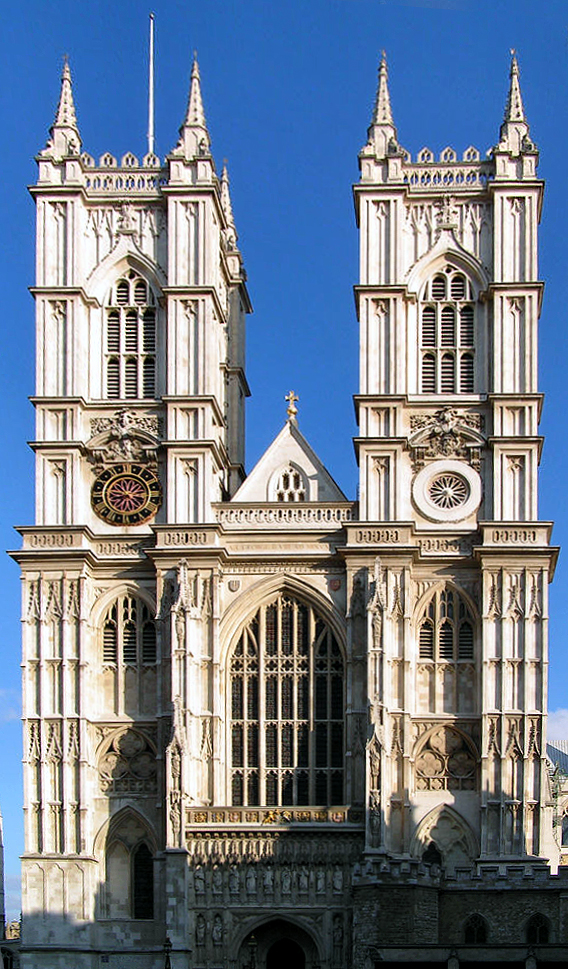
Westminster Abbey, west facade

Robert Blair (1593 – 27 August 1666) was a Scottish Presbyterian minister who became a Westminster Divine and Moderator of the General Assembly of the Church of Scotland in 1646. A supporter of the Scottish Reformation, he refused to follow the episcopal church, and preached as a Covenanter.

== Life ==
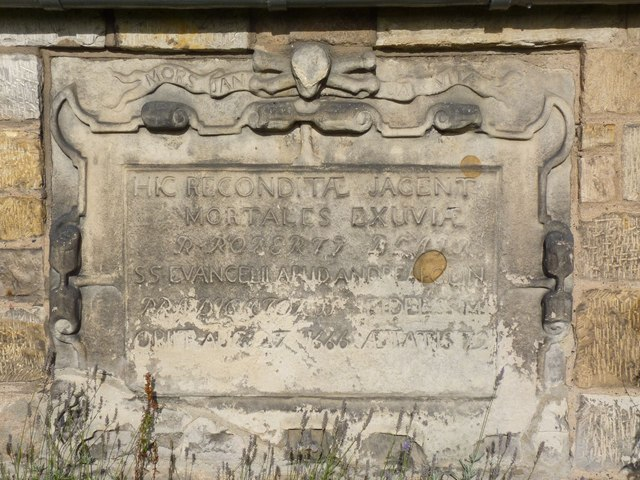
Robert Blair's Gravestone

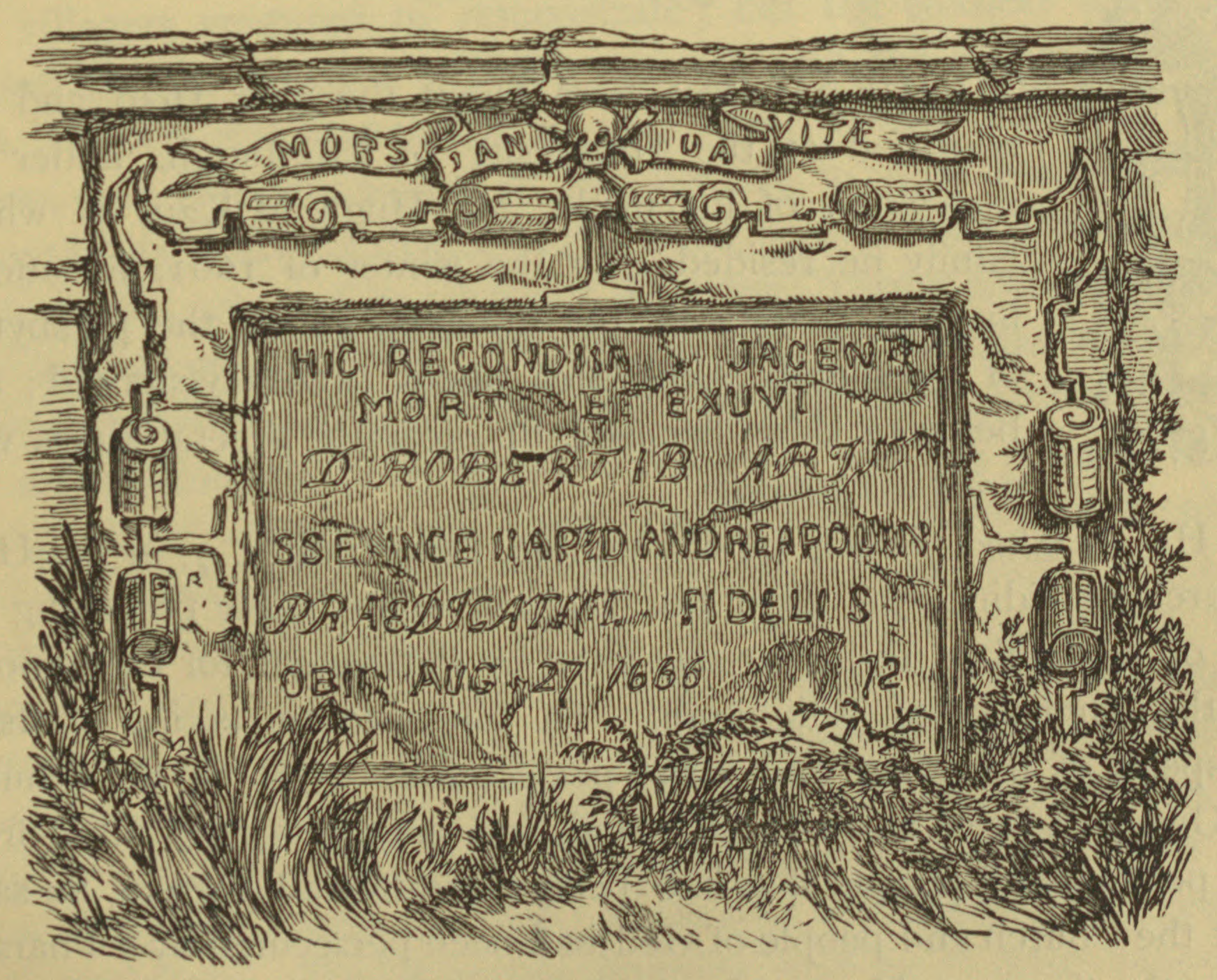
Robert Blairs Grave, St Fillans, Aberdour. The scroll that surmounts it bears the inscription, Mors Janua Vitae — Death is the Gate of Life; and the simple epitaph when translated runs thus : "Here lie the mortal remains of the Reverend Robert Blair, a most faithful preacher of the Gospel at St. Andrews. He died on the 27th of August 1666, in the 73d year of his age."

=== Early life ===
He was a native of Irvine, Ayrshire. His father was a merchant-adventurer, John Blair of Windyedge. His mother was Beatrix Muir (of the house of Rowallan), who lived for nearly a century.

From the parish school at Irvine, Blair proceeded to the University of Glasgow, where he took his degree of M.A. He is stated to have acted as a schoolmaster in Glasgow. In his twenty-second year he was appointed a regent or professor in the university. One of his students was the future author of polemics for the Covenanters, Robert Baillie.

=== Career ===
In 1616 he was licensed as a preacher of the gospel in connection with the established church (presbyterian) of Scotland. In 1622 he resigned his professorship after a disagreement with his Principal regarding the Episcopalian system of church government.

==== Ireland ====
He then travelled to Ireland, where he was called to Bangor, County Down, and ordained by Robert Echlin, the Bishop of Down, on 10 July 1623. He was one of the preachers involved in the Six Mile Water Revival in 1625; this was seen as a presbyterian work, rather than episcopalian, and he was suspended from his post in 1631. He was deposed in 1632 for nonconformity. This was due to another disagreement with his Bishop regarding Episcopalian hierarchy. Echlin had turned a blind eye in the 1620s to presbyterian clergy in his diocese, but Blair (on his own account) didn't react to hints by Theophilus Buckworth, Bishop of Dromore, and was then interviewed by James Ussher, who tried to persuade him with arguments current from John Sprint. By the intervention of the king, Charles I, he was restored in May 1634; but the former sentence was renewed, with excommunication, by John Bramhall, bishop of Derry, the same year.

==== Return to Scotland ====
Excommunicated and ejected, Blair, along with others, fitted out a ship, intending to go to America in 1636; however the weather proved so bad that they were beaten back, and, returning to Scotland, he lived partly in that country and partly in England. Orders were issued in England for his apprehension in 1637, but he escaped to Scotland, and preached for some time in Ayr. He was invited to go to France as chaplain to the regiment of Colonel Patrick Hepburn of Waughton, but after embarking at Leith he was threatened by a soldier whom he had reproved for swearing, and went ashore again. He also petitioned the privy council 'for liberty to preach the gospel,' and received an appointment at Burntisland in April 1638. He was nominated to St. Andrews in the same year, and was admitted there on 8 October 1639.

==== During the War of the Three Kingdoms ====
Between 1639 and 1653 there were several military and religious conflicts between England, Scotland and Ireland.

In the Second Bishops' War of 1640, Blair accompanied the Scottish army on its march into England. He assisted in the negotiations for the treaty of peace presented by Charles I on 8 November 1641. After the Irish Rebellion of 1641 he once more went to Ireland with several other clergymen of the Scottish kirk, the Irish general assembly (presbyterian) having petitioned for supplies for their vacant charges. He afterwards returned to St. Andrews.

In 1645 he attended the lord president Robert Spottiswoode and others to the scaffold. In the same year, he was one of the Scottish ministers who went to Newcastle to speak very plainly to the king. In 1646 he was elected Moderator of the General Assembly of the Church of Scotland (3 June). Later, on the death of Alexander Henderson, he was appointed chaplain-in-ordinary to the king, supported by the revenues of the Chapel Royal. The Commission of the General Assembly, in 1648, named him one of those for 'endeavouring to get Cromwell to establish a uniformity of religion in England.'

At the division of the church, in 1650, into Resolutioners and Protesters, he leaned to the former, but lamented the strife. Summoned with others to London in 1654, that 'a method might be devised for settling affairs of the church', he pleaded ill-health and declined to go. In the same year he was appointed by the council of England 'one of those for the admission to the ministry in Perth, Fife, and Angus.'

==== Later life ====
At the Restoration, he came under the notice of Archbishop James Sharp, had to resign his charge in September 1661, and was banned from being within 20 miles of St Andrews. He was confined to certain places, first of all to Musselburgh, afterwards to Kirkcaldy (where he remained three and a half years), and finally to Meikle Couston near Aberdour. As a Covenanter he preached outdoors.

He died at Aberdour on 27 August 1666, and was buried in the parish churchyard, his stone being on the south side of the ruined church.

== Family ==
Blair was married twice;

(1) on 16 July 1626, Beatrix (died July 1632, aged 27), daughter of Robert Hamilton, merchant, burgess of Edinburgh. They had three children - James, one of the ministers of Dysart; Robert; and Jean, who married William Row, minister of Ceres.

(2) Katherine, daughter of Hugh Montgomerie of Braidstane, Viscount Airds. They had nine children - William; David, minister of Old Kirk Parish, Edinburgh (father of Robert Blair, minister of Athelstane-ford, poet and author of The Grave); Samuel; John, writer; Archibald; Alexander; Andrew; Montgomery; Hugh, merchant, (grandfather of Dr. Hugh Blair); and Catherine (married George Campbell, minister of Old Kirk, Edinburgh, and Professor of Divinity).

== Works ==
- Autobiography was published by the Wodrow Society (1848); fragments were published in 1754.
- Preface to Durham's Treatise on Scandal.
- Commentary on the Book of Proverbs, (ready but not published)
- Answer to Bishop Hall's Remonstrance, ready for the Press, but these were never published.
