= List of provosts of Dundee =

Ceremonial officer in Dundee, Scotland

Lord Provost of Dundee
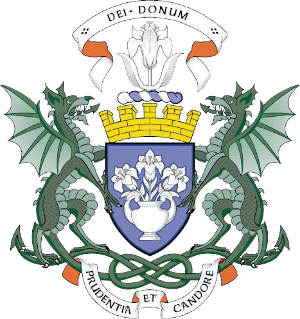
- Incumbent; Bill Campbell since 20 May 2022
- Appointer: Dundee City Council approved by the Monarch
- Term length: Elected by Dundee City Council at the start of each session, and upon a vacancy
- First holder: Alexander Mathewson (first recorded holder, though role existed before)
- Deputy: Kevin Cordell

The Lord Provost of Dundee is the chair and civic head of the Dundee City Council in Scotland. They are elected by the city council and serve not only as the chair of that body, but as a figurehead and Lord Lieutenant for the city. They are equivalent in many ways to the institution of Mayor that exists in other countries.

Each of the 32 Scottish local authorities elects a Provost, but it is only the four largest cities, Glasgow, Edinburgh, Aberdeen and Dundee that have a Lord Provost. This is enshrined in the Local Government etc. (Scotland) Act 1994.

The Mediaeval burgh of Dundee was administered by officials known as "Bailies", Provosts and the office of "Constable of Dundee". The office of Provost as the single chief official of the burgh was not created until the 1480s.

== List of provosts and lord provosts ==
=== Provosts ===
==== 15th century ====
- 1443 – William de Straithain
- 1454 – Henry de Fothringhame of Pourie
- 1459 – Thomas Spalding
- 1460 – William de Strathauchtyne
- 1461 – John Scrymgeour
- 1463 – David Aberkirdor
- 1463–1464 – James Blare
- 1466 – Robert Graham
- 1469–1470 – John Hay
- 1470 – Malcolm Guthrie
- 1476 – James Fullerton
- 1478–1479 – Robert Graham of Fintry
- 1482 – David Rollok
- 1483 – Robert Graham of Fintry
- 1483–1484 – David Aberkirdor
- 1485–1492 – James Rollok
- 1492–1497 – James Scrymgeour, (Constable of Dundee)
- 1497–1498 – Robert Graham of Fintry

==== 16th century ====
- 1504–1509 – James Rollok
- 1509–1513 – Alexander Ogilvie
- 1513 – Andrew Gray, 2nd Lord Gray
- 1513 – Andrew Abercrombie
- 1513–1514 – Alexander Lindsay 7th Earl of Crawford
- 1514–1516 – James Rollok
- 1516–1520 – James Scrymgeour, (Constable of Dundee)
- 1520–1523 – Alexander Ogilvie
- 1523–1525 – William Carmichael of Carpow
- 1526–1528 – John Scrymgeour of Glaister
- 1528–1530 – James Scrymgeour, (Constable of Dundee)
- 1531–1532 – John Barrie
- 1543–1544 – Walter Scrymgeour of Glaswell
- 1544–1545 – Robert Myln
- 1550 – James Dog of Dunrobbene
- 1551–1565 – James Halyburton
- 1565–1566 – David Lindsay, 9th Earl of Crawford
- 1566–1586 – James Halyburton
- 1586–1590 – James Scrymgeour of Dudhope
- 1590–1592 – James Forrester
- 1592–1593 – James Auchinlek
- 1593–1609 – Sir James Scrymgeour

==== 17th century ====
- 1609–1614 – William Duncan
- 1614–1626 – William Auchinlek
- 1626–1631 – Thomas Halyburton
- 1631–1633 – Thomas Auchinlek
- 1633–1637 Thomas Davidson
- 1637–1643 – James Fletcher
- 1643–1646 – James Piersoun
- 1646–1650 – William Kinneris (Kinnear)
- 1650–1658 – Thomas Mudy
- 1658–1659 – Sir Thomas Mudy
- 1659–1666 – Alexander Wedderburn
- 1666–1667 – George Fletcher
- 1667–1669 – George Brown
- 1669–1670 – John Tarbet
- 1670–1672 – Alexander Watson
- 1672–1677 George Brown
- 1677–1681 – Alexander Wedderburn of Easter Powrie
- 1681–1685 – Alexander Duncan
- 1685–1686 – James Fletcher
- 1686–1687 – Major General John Graham of Claverhouse
- 1687–1688 – James Fletcher
- 1688–1689 – Major General John Graham of Claverhouse
- 1689–1698 – James Fletcher
- 1698–1700 – Alexander Blair

==== 18th century ====
- 1700–1702 – John Scrymgeour
- 1702–1704 – John Duncan
- 1704–1706 – Alexander Blair
- 1706–1708 – George Yeaman
- 1708–1710 – Alexander Blair
- 1710–1712 – George Yeaman
- 1712–1714 – Magister Henry Guthrie
- 1714–1716 – Alexander Ballingall
- 1716–1717 – John Scrymgeour (Installed by order of the Duke of Argyll, see The 'Fifteen)
  * 1717 –1719 Magister Alexander Duncan of Lundie
- 1719–1721 – John Scrymgeour
- 1721–1723 – Thomas Bower
- 1723–1725 – David Maxwell
- 1725–1727 – George Ramsay
- 1727–1728 – Alexander Ferrier
- 1728–1731 – James Fairweather
- 1731–1732 Alexander Robertson
- 1732–1735 – James Fairweather
- 1735–1736 – Patrick Maxwell
- 1736–1738 – Andrew Wardropper
- 1738–1741 – John Donaldson
- 1741–1742 – Alexander Robertson
- 1742–1744 – Patrick Yeaman of Blacklaw
- 1744–1747 – Alexander Duncan of Lundie
- 1747–1748 – Patrick Yeaman of Blacklaw
- 1748–1750 – George Yeaman of Balbeuchly
- 1750–1753 – Patrick Yeaman of Blacklaw
- 1753–1754 – Andrew Wardropper
- 1754–1757 – Patrick Yeaman
- 1757–1758 – Andrew Wardropper
- 1758–1761 – George Yeaman
- 1761–1762 – Patrick Yeaman
- 1762–1764 – John Halyburton
- 1764–1766 – John Barclay
- 1766–1768 – Patrick Maxwell
- 1768–1770 – George Maxwell
- 1770–1772 – Patrick Maxwell
- 1772–1774 – Henry Geekie
- 1774–1776 – Patrick Maxwell
- 1776–1778 – George Maxwell of Balmyle
- 1778–1780 – Henry Geekie
- 1780–1782 – Patrick Maxwell
- 1782–1784 – John Pitcairn
- 1784–1786 – Patrick Maxwell
- 1786–1788 – John Pitcairn
- 1788–1790 – Alexander Riddoch
- 1790–1792 – James Johnston
- 1792–1794 – Alexander Riddoch
- 1794–1796 – Alexander Thoms
- 1796–1798 – Alexander Riddoch
- 1798–1800 – Alexander Thoms

==== 19th century ====
- 1800–1802 – Alexander Riddoch
- 1802–1804 – John Guild
- 1804–1807 – Alexander Riddoch
- 1807–1808 – John Guild
- 1808–1810 – Alexander Riddoch
- 1810–1812 – John Guild
- 1812–1814 – Alexander Riddoch
- 1814–1816 – John Guild
- 1816–1818 – Alexander Riddoch
- 1818–1820 – Patrick Anderson
- 1820–1822 – David Brown
- 1822–1824 – Patrick Anderson
- 1824–1826 – David Brown
- 1826–1828 – Alexander Balfour
- 1828–1830 – Thomas Bell
- 1831 – Robert Jobson
- 1831–1833 – William Lindsay
- 1833–1839 – Alexander Kay
- 1839–1841 – William Hackney
- 1841 – William Johnstone
- 1841–1844 – Alexander Lawson
- 1844–1847 – James Brown
- 1847–1853 – Patrick Hunter Thoms
- 1853–1856 – George Rough
- 1856–1858 – John Ewan
- 1858 – David Rollo
- 1858–1861 – David Jobson
- 1861–1867 – Charles Parker
- 1867–1869 – William Hay
- 1869–1872 – James Yeaman
- 1872–1875 – James Cox
- 1875–1878 – William Robertson
- 1878–1881 – William Brownlee
- 1881–1884 – Alexander Hay Moncur
- 1884–1887 – Hugh Ballingall
- 1887–1890 – William Hunter

=== Lord Provosts ===
Tenure	Provost	Political party
1890–1893	Alexander Mathewson	
1893–1896	Sir James Low	
1896–1899	Henry McGrady	
1899–1902	William Hunter	
1902–1905	Charles Barrie	
1905–1908	William Longair	
1908–1914	Sir James Urquhart	
1914–1920	Sir William Don	
1920–1923	Sir Alexander Spence	
1923–1929	Sir William High	
1929–1932	George Anderson Johnston	
1932–1935	William Huntley Buist	
1935–1940	Sir John Phin	
1940–1946	Sir Garnet Wilson	Liberal Party
1946–1949	Archibald Powrie	
1949	John Campsie Adamson	
1949–1952	Richard Fenton	
1952–1954	William Black	
1954–1960	William Hughes	Labour
1960–1967	Maurice McManus	
1967–1970	Alexander MacKenzie	
1970–1973	William K. Fitzgerald	
1973–1975	Thomas W. Moore	
1975–1977	Charles D.P. Farquhar	
1977–1980	Henry W.C. Vaughan	
1980–1984	James P. Gowans	Labour
1984–1992	Thomas Mitchell	Labour
1992–1995	Thomas M. McDonald	Labour
1995–1996	Norman A. McGowan	Labour
1996–1999	Mervyn J. Rolfe	Labour
1999–2001	Helen Wright	Labour
2001–2012	John Letford	Labour
2001–2012	John Letford	Independent
2012–2017	Bob Duncan	SNP
2017–2022	Ian Borthwick	Independent
2022–present	Bill Campbell (Note: Kevin Cordell serves as the Deputy Lord Provost.)	SNP

== Deputy lieutenants ==
A deputy lieutenant of Dundee is commissioned by the Lord Lieutenant of Dundee. Deputy lieutenants support the work of the lord-lieutenant. There can be several deputy lieutenants at any time, depending on the population of the county. Their appointment does not terminate with the changing of the lord-lieutenant, but they usually retire at age 75.

=== 19th Century ===
- 9 November 1894: Claude Bowes-Lyon, 13th Earl of Strathmore and Kinghorne
- 9 November 1894: Robert Haldane-Duncan, 3rd Earl of Camperdown
- 9 November 1894: Colonel Sir Reginald Ogilvy
- 9 November 1894: Sir John Leng
- 9 November 1894: Sir Thomas Thornton
- 9 November 1894: Edmund Robertson, 1st Baron Lochee
- 9 November 1894: William Robertson
- 9 November 1894: Alexander Hay Moncur
- 9 November 1894: William Hunter
- 9 November 1894: Hugh Ballingall
- 9 November 1894: Alexander Mathewson
- 9 November 1894: William Brownlee
- 9 November 1894: James Erskine Erskine
- 9 November 1894: Duncan Macdonald
- 9 November 1894: John Sharp
- 9 November 1894: Sir James Low
- 9 November 1894: George Addison Cox
- 9 November 1894: George W. Baxter
- 9 November 1894: Henry M'Grady
