= Kinnettles =

Civil parish in Angus, Scotland

Coordinates: 56.609°N 2.939°W

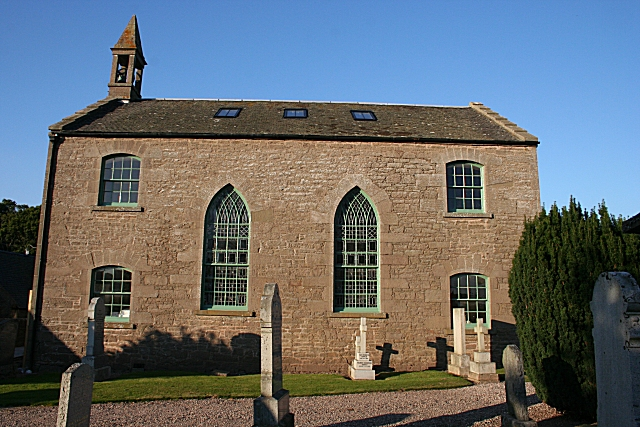
Kinnettles Parish Kirk

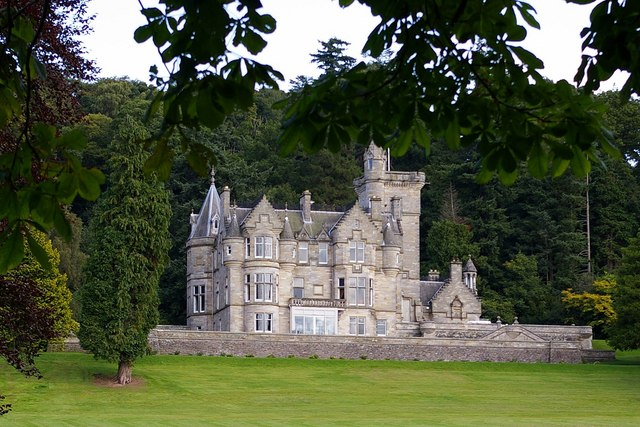
Kinnettles House

Kinnettles is a civil parish in Angus, a council area in the northeast of Scotland. The Parish is bounded on the north and east by Forfar, on the southeast and south by Inverarity and the southwest and northwest by Glamis. The centre of the Parish is dominated by the oblong Brigton Hill (164m) whose steepest slopes descend to the Kerbet Water. The Kerbet valley is well wooded and contains two small hamlets, Kirkton and Douglastown. The only other sizeable group of dwellings is at Ingliston on the flatter area to the northwest of the A94 Forfar to Glamis road. The northern boundary is the "Great Drain", now known as the Dean Water. Strathmore Estates constructed this, from Forfar Loch to the Kerbet, in the 18th century and thus helped to drain this previously boggy area. In addition, it provided a transportation route for marl from the Loch to the Estate.

The parish church dates from 1811 and was designed by Dundee architect Samuel Bell.

There are three local estates: Brigton, Invereighty, and Kinnettles House. The latest iteration of the mansion at Kinnettles House, built in 1864 by merchant James Paterson, has served as home for such people as Member of Parliament (MP) Sir Harry Hope and Wing Commander Dudley Lloyd-Evans.
