= Helen Wright (politician) =

First female Lord Provost of Dundee, Scotland

Bailie Helen Wright
- Born: 1943 (age 82–83)
- Occupation: Councillor
- Known for: politician and campaigner trade union national official first female lord provost of Dundee
- Political party: Labour
- Awards: Lifetime Legend Award in November 2023

Helen W. Wright (born 1943) has served as a councillor in Dundee since 1980. In November 2023, Wright won the Lifetime Legend Award in recognition of her work and achievements over many years. She was the only female member of the 25-member ruling Labour administration when she won the Fairmuir seat in 1980 and was the first female Lord Provost of Dundee when elected to that post in 1999. Wright was a trade union national official in the 1970s, chair of the UK-wide local government women’s committee (NALGWC), a sitting magistrate for 18 years, prison visitor, NHS health board member, Community Justice Authority Regional and Scottish chair, charity worker and holder of senior local government positions and roles. Helen Wright currently holds various positions in Dundee City Council, is a Bailie, a board member of various organisations, and carries out regular voluntary and charity work.

== Career ==
Helen Wright was a national official of a major trades union in the 1970s (chairwoman of the AUEW-TASS National Women's Sub Committee (NWSC) 1977-1981), is a campaigner for women's rights and equality, a director of various organisations, has been a local councillor since 1980, and was appointed as a Fellow of the Al-Maktoum Institute in 2006. She represented the council on the Dundee Health and Social Care Partnership (IJB) from 2018 - 2022, was previously a member of Dundee Local Health Council in the 1980's and the NHS Tayside Board from 2003 - 2009, a sitting magistrate in Dundee District Court 1982-2000, served in many of the senior local government positions including convenor of social work and health, convener of special appeals, convener of equal opportunities, convener of community services, the first female lord provost of Dundee, a prison visitor 1996-2006, chair of the Community Justice Authority (CJA) Scottish conveners’ group 2007-2014 and Tayside CJA convener 2007-2017, chair of the UK local government women's committee (NALGWC) 1989-1992, a charity and voluntary worker - including Director, Children in Scotland 2003 - 2007 and President of the City of Dundee Lions 2015.

== From administration to opposition and beyond ==
When Labour Councillor Wright served from 1999-2001 as the city of Dundee's first female Lord Provost, she headed a minority administration with a Scottish National Party opposition, with Independent, Liberal Democrats and Conservatives as the other minority groups. Labour lost control of Dundee City Council after a March 2009 by-election result which gave the SNP an additional seat.

Opposition to Wright as lord provost started only weeks after taking up the post, as indicated in the 1999 press article "Moves against lord provost”. As well as being the first woman to hold this post, in 2001 she also became the first in the city to be voted out of office after a row about expenditure and expenses.

She had an official portrait painted by artist Adam B. Kerr which is held in the Dundee Art Galleries and Museum's collections.

After holding the Fairmuir seat continuously from 1980, Wright was re-elected to represent the Coldside Ward in the new single-tier unitary authority in 2007 (first election under the STV system), 2012, 2017 and again in 2022.

In 2020, with most UK politicians, she was forced, due to the COVID-19 pandemic in the United Kingdom, to withdraw from personal face-to-face 'surgery' consulting meetings with her constituents but she now holds five face-to-face surgeries per week. She holds the positions of Bailie, Honorary Fellow and Board Member of Al-Maktoum Institute Council, Fleming Trust board member, Dundee Rep and Scottish Dance Theatre Director, Chief Whip of the council Labour Group and holds various shadow spokesperson roles.
