= The Howff =

Burial ground in Dundee, Scotland

Coordinates: 56.4615°N 2.9727°W

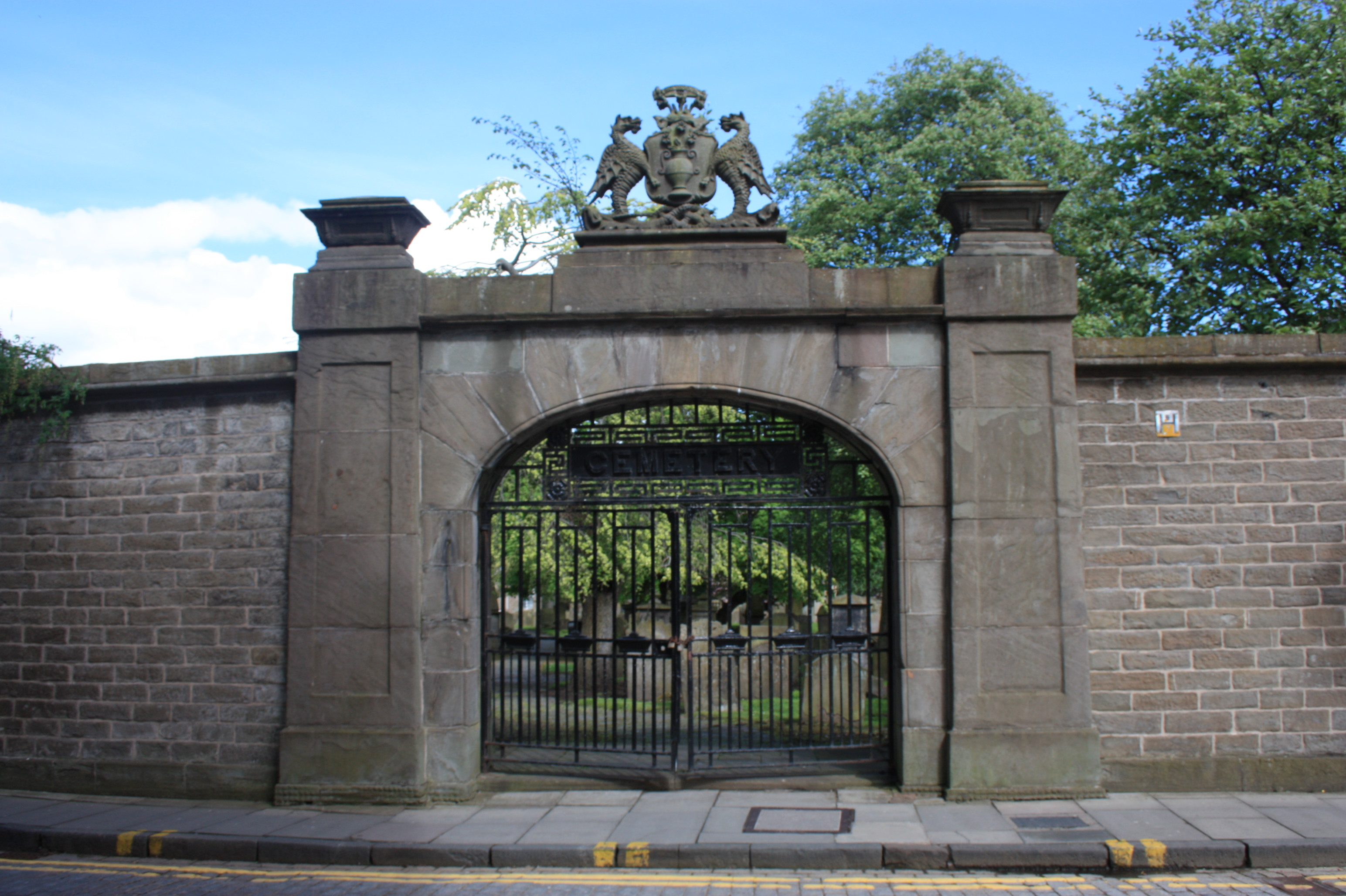
The original west gate, the Howff Cemetery

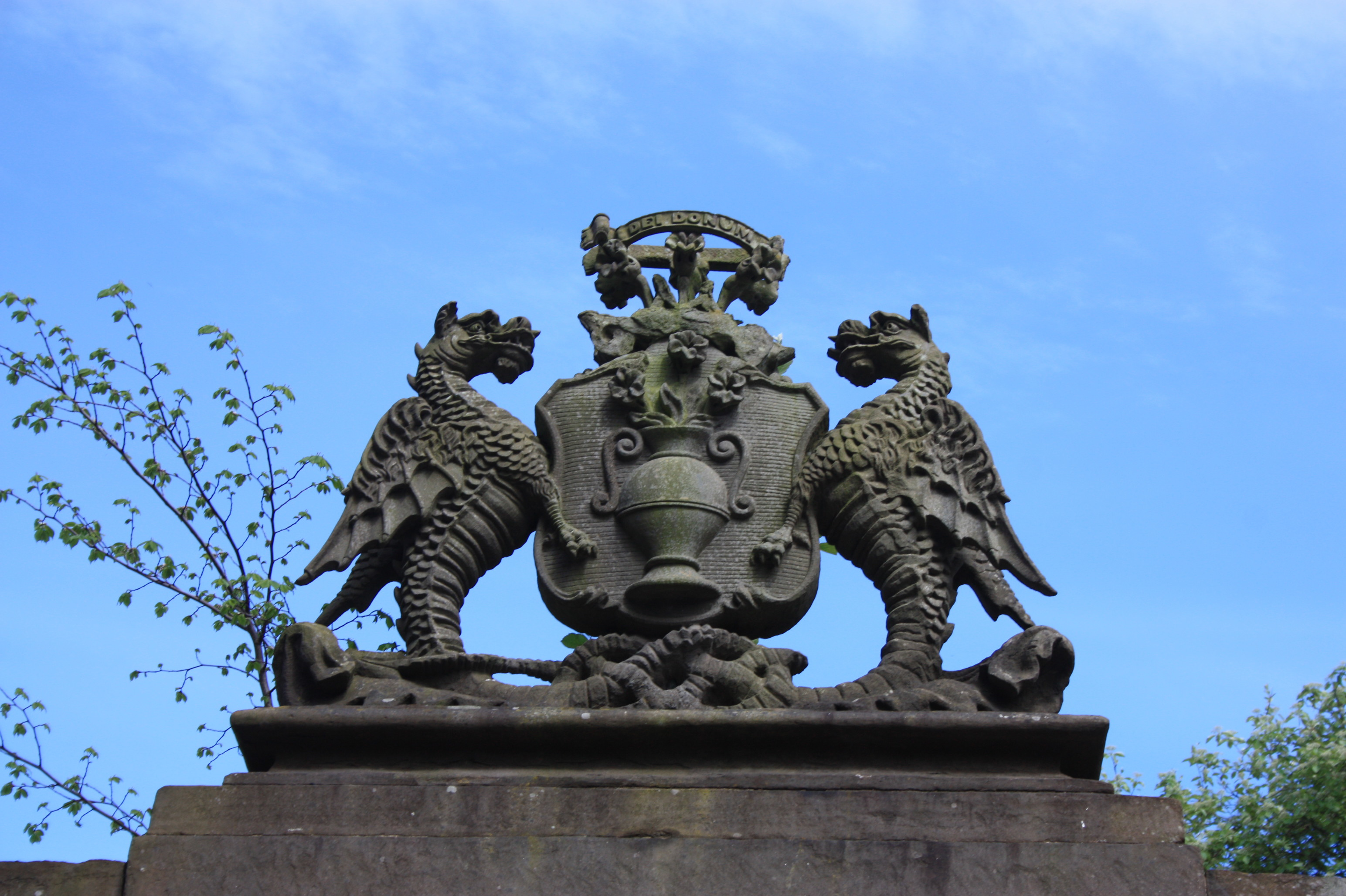
The crest over the entrance, the Howff Cemetery, Dundee

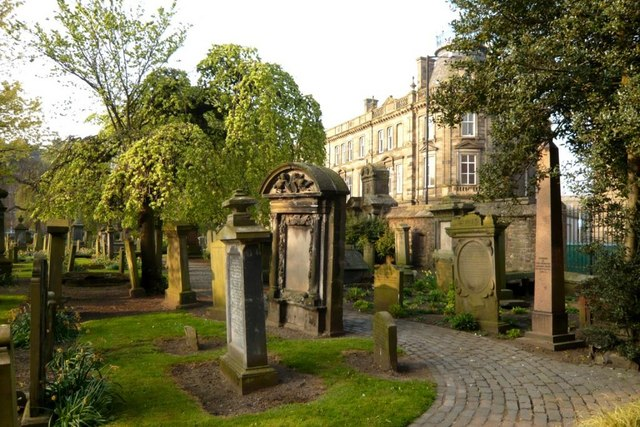
The Howff

The Howff is a burial ground in the city of Dundee, Scotland. Established in 1564, it has one of the most important collections of tombstones in Scotland, and is protected as a category A listed building.

The majority of graves face exactly due east.

== History ==
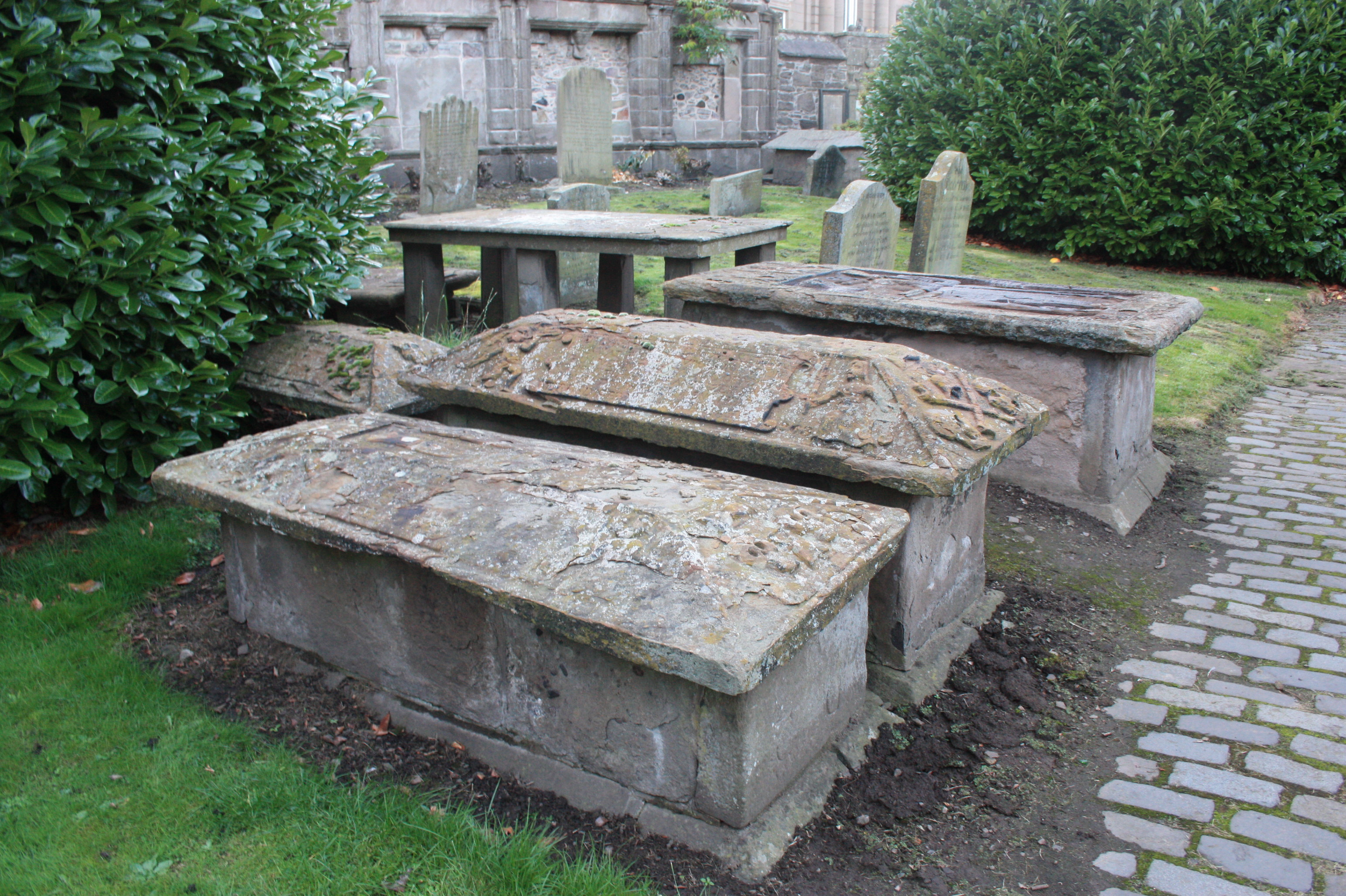
Coffer tombs, The Howff, Dundee

The land of the burial ground was part of the Franciscan (Greyfriars) Monastery until the Scottish Reformation. In 1564 Mary, Queen of Scots granted the land to the burgh of Dundee, for use as a burial ground. It was used for meetings by the Dundee Incorporated Trades, and subsequently became known as The Howff, from the Scots word howff 'an enclosed open space, yard, area (as a timber yard)', likely related to German or Dutch hof 'enclosed space, courtyard'. Old parish records for burials within The Howff begin in the late 18th century. Prior to this records of mortcloth hire, a cloth rented out by the Guildry and Trades to cover bodies or coffins before burial, provide evidence of burials dating back to 1655. Meetings at The Howff ceased in 1776. The last burial took place in 1878 (George Duncan). The walls along the west side date from 1601.

The vault to the extreme south west (now simply saying "Blackness" inside) was the burial Vault of the Wedderburns of Blackness House in Dundee. A sealed window on its exterior appears to indicate this was either a watch-house or part of the original meeting house prior to the vault being built (c. 1630).

The graveyard is highly unusual by Scottish standards, containing a high number of Roman-style coffer tombs. It also contains a high number of inscriptions which philosophise on death itself rather than discuss the person interred.

Of the 80,000 burials in the Howff around 3% are classed as "foreign" but many simply bear this label due to birth at sea, reflecting Dundee's maritime heritage. As an odder distinction, some 10% of the deaths are specifically recorded as "Irish burials", largely labourers in the early 19th century.

== Burials ==
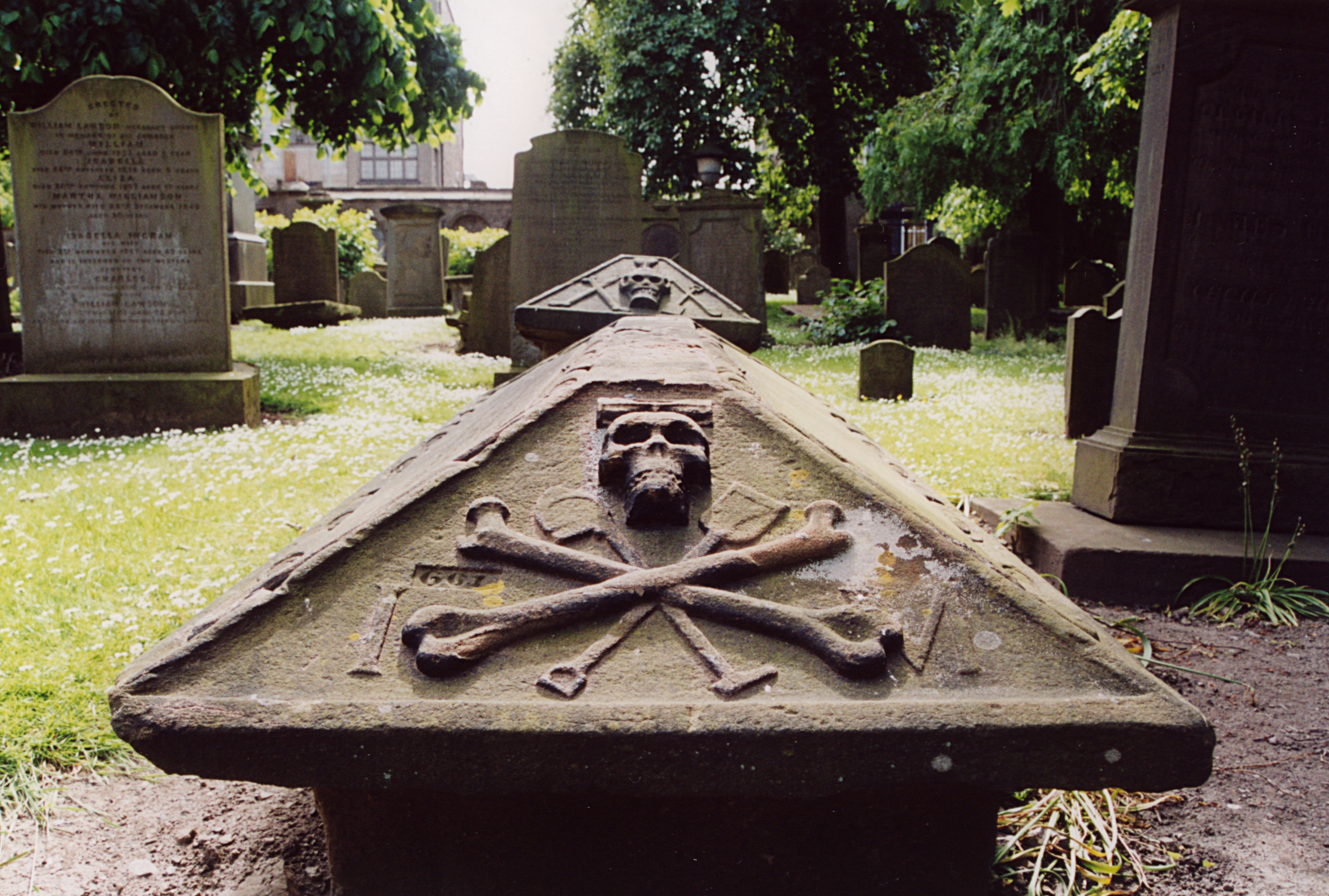
Grave in The Howff

Burials at The Howff include:

- Alexander Bell (1776–1852), surgeon
- Samuel Bell (1739-1813) town architect
- Thomas Bell (1759–1844), Provost of Dundee
- James Chalmers (1782–1853), printer, bookseller and inventor of the adhesive postage stamp
- Sir Alexander Douglas of Glenbervie (1738–1812)
- George Duncan (1791–1878), politician and last person to be buried in the Howff
- George Forrester (1635–1675), Dean of Guild in Dundee
- John Glas (1695–1773), clergyman and founder of the Glasite movement
- Clementina Stirling Graham (1782–1877), Scottish hostess and author
- James and Janet Keiller (1737–1813), creators of Keiller's marmalade
- Baron Jhone Kynnier (John Kinnear) (1511–1584)
- David Lindsay, 1st Earl of Crawford (c. 1360–1407), interred in the now destroyed pre-reformation Greyfriars kirk
- John Lyon (1765–1814), botanist (memorial only)
- John Pitcairn (d.1800), Provost of Dundee
- Alexander Riddoch (1744–1822), eight times Provost of Dundee
- John Scrymsour (sic) (1611–1657), Provost of Dundee
- The Wedderburn and Ogilvy-Wedderburn baronets of Balindean (multiple graves)

== The New Howff ==
In 1834 a new cemetery, which was known as the New Howff, was opened on what was then the northern edge of the town on the lower slopes of Dundee Law. This cemetery, which was influenced by Glasgow Necropolis, was more or less destroyed by later building works. Firstly the construction of Dundee's inner ring road in the 1960s cut through the site, and this was followed by the erection of a multi-storey car park over the New Hoff's southern end. Some grave stones were saved and positioned against its western wall which had originally been the boundary between the cemetery and the Dundee and Newtyle Railway.
