= Samuel Bell (architect) =

Scottish architect (1739–1813)

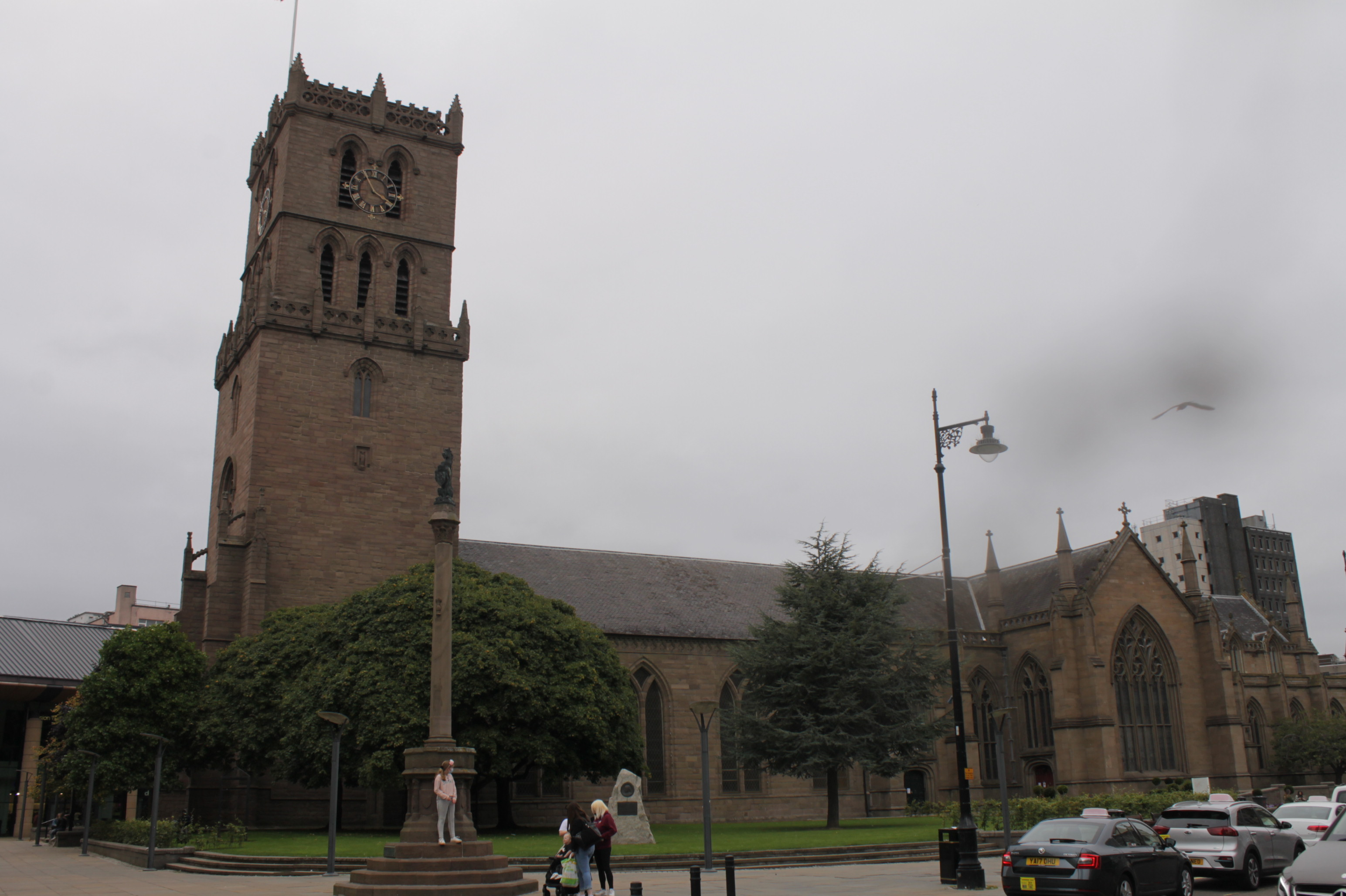
The Steeple Church, Dundee

Samuel Bell (1739–1813) was a Scottish architect mainly associated with the town of Dundee. He was the prime shaper of the city centre and in particular the Nethergate.

== Life ==
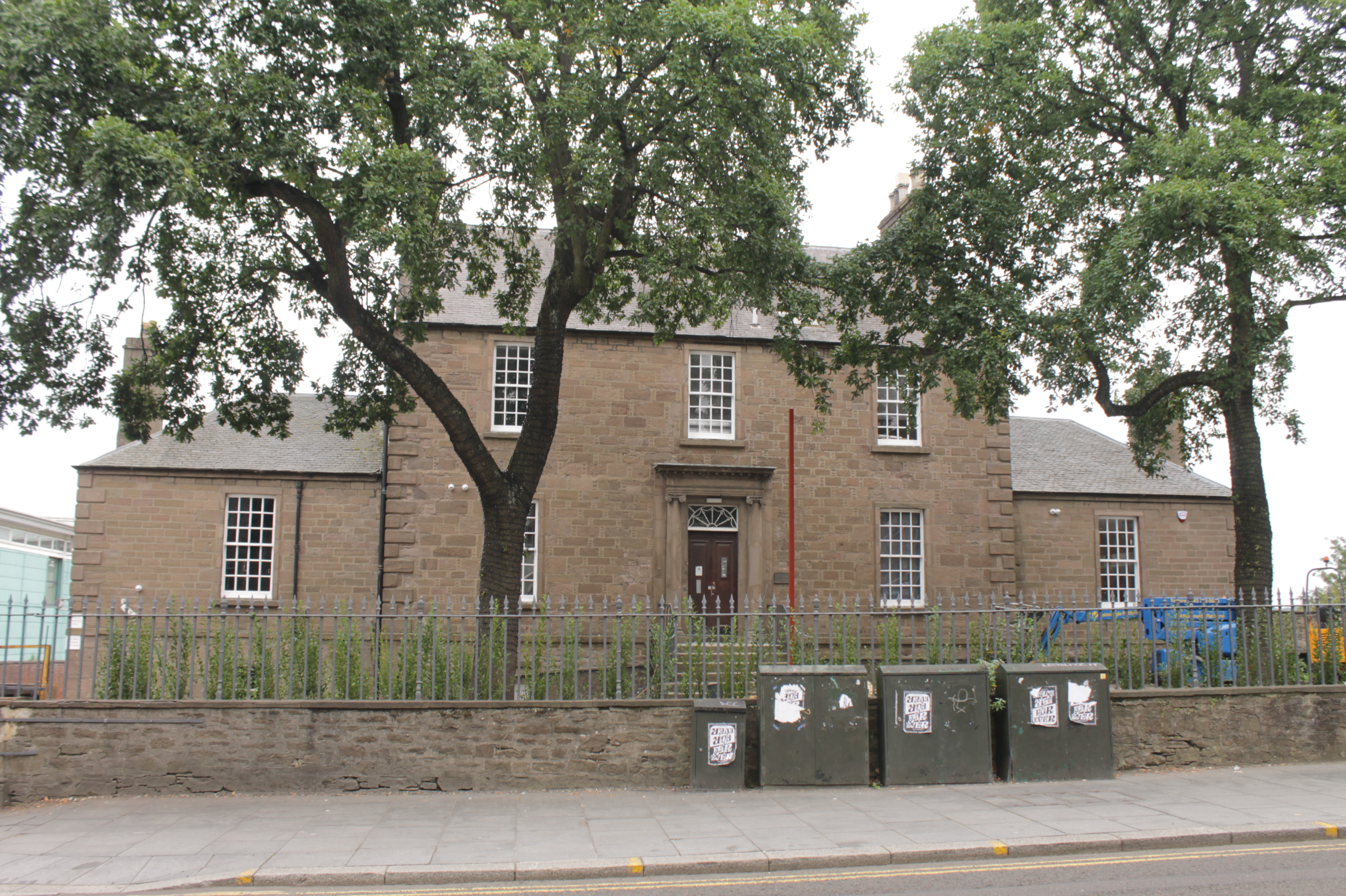
Nethergate House, Dundee

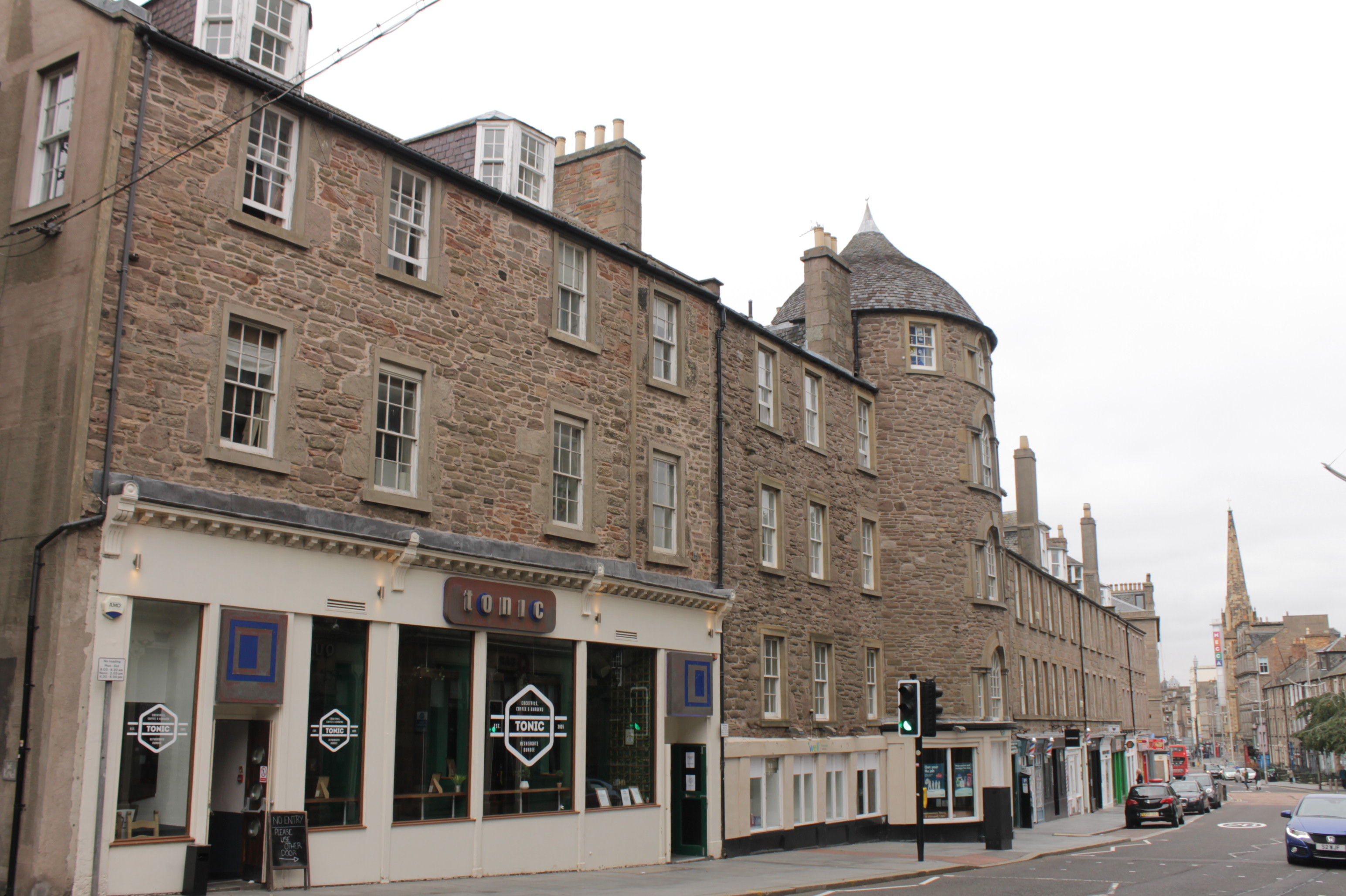
Morgan Tower, Nethergate, Dundee

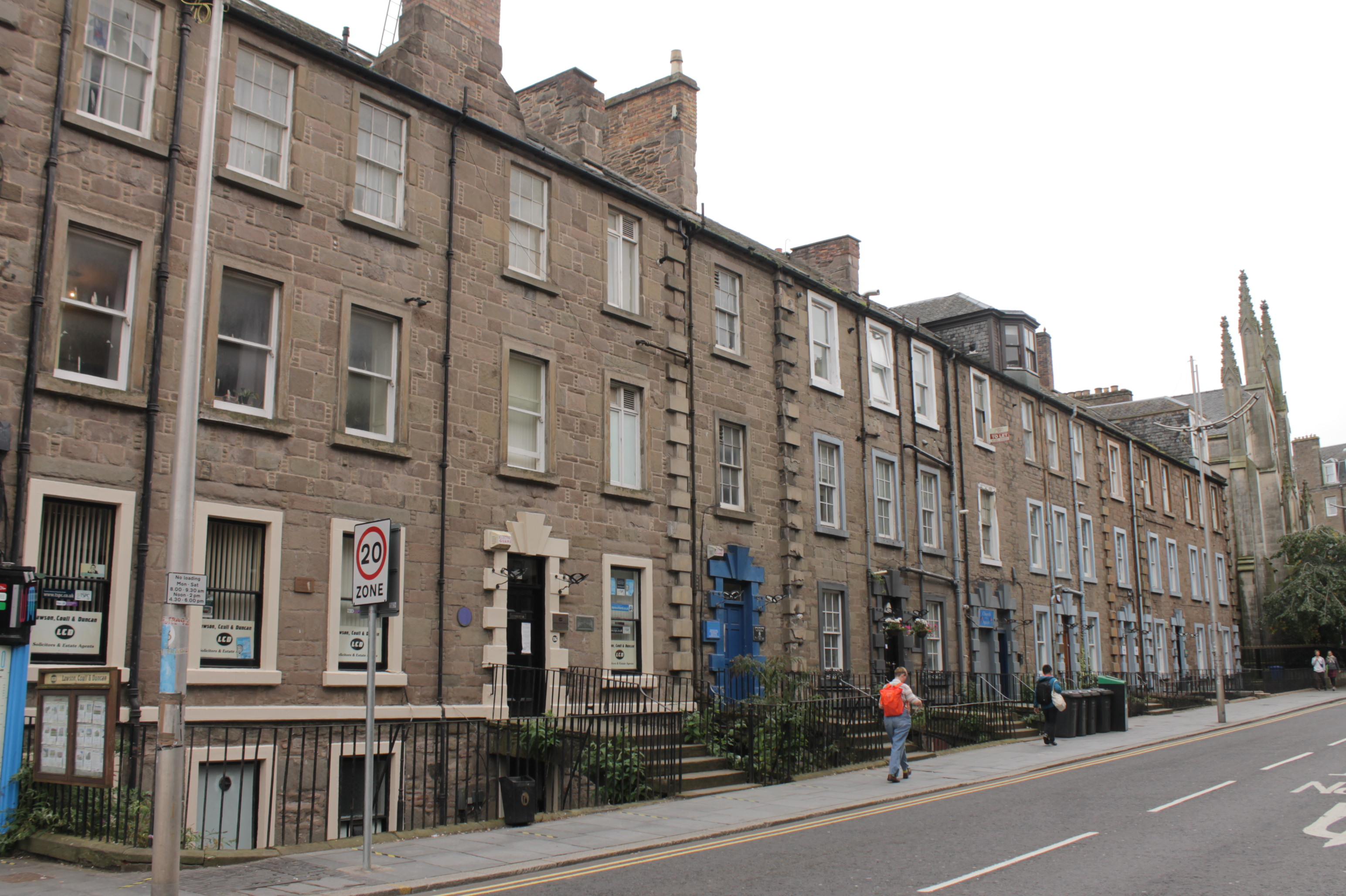
Miln's Building, Nethergate, Dundee

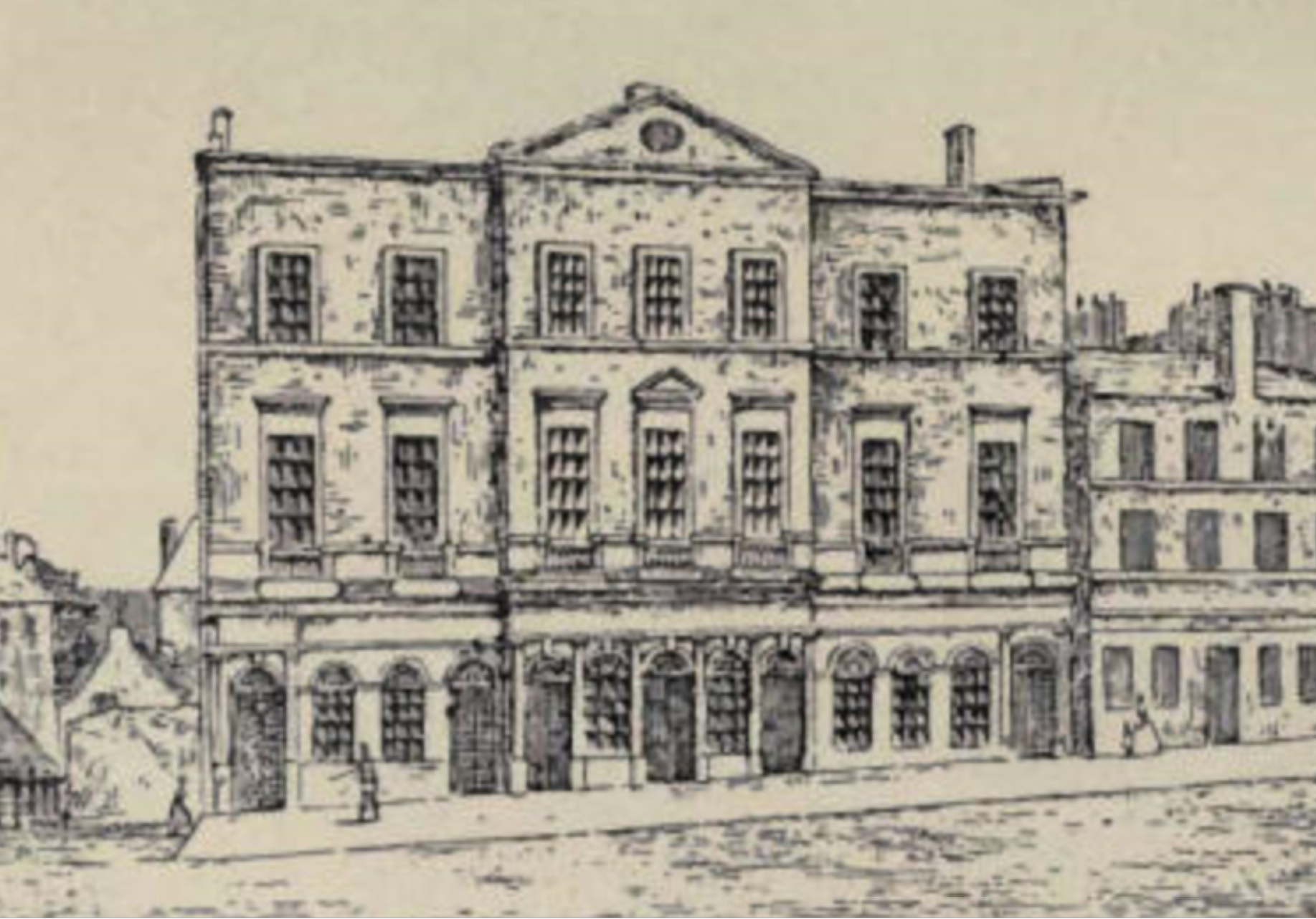
Theatre Royal Dundee

He was born on 6 May 1739, the son of John Bell, a wright in Dundee and originally trained as a wright himself. In this role he would have worked with local architects from 1755 to 1770. He then became an architect and received many local commissions from 1770 onwards.

He was the first person to be officially Town Architect for Dundee. His most important commission in terms of prestige was the major rebuilding of Dundee's primary church: the Steeple Church.

He died on 23 January 1813 and is buried in The Howff burial ground in Dundee.

== Main works ==
All works are in Dundee unless otherwise stated.

- St Andrews Church (1772) working with James Craig
- Trades Hall (1776)
- English Episcopal Chapel (1783)
- St Clements Church (1786) later renamed the Steeple Church
- Forfar Parish Church (1788)
- "Miln's Building" at 136 Nethergate (1790)
- Morgan Tower, 133-139 Nethergate (1790)
- Town house for Alexander Riddoch (1790) now known as Nethergate House
- Sailor's Home (1790)
- Trinity House (1790)
- Lintrathen manse (1795)
- Tannadice manse (1797)
- Duntrune Mill (1799)
- Aberlemno Parish Church (1799)
- Theatre Royal (1808)
- Kinnettles Parish Church (1811)
- St Rule's Church, Monifieth (1812)

The Theatre Royal still exists as a frontage; at 7 to 21 Castle Street Nethergate House also survives.

== Family ==
Not known
