= John Lyon (botanist) =

Scottish botanist and plant collector (1765–1814)

John Lyon (1765–14 September, 1814) was an 18th/19th century Scottish botanist and plant collector in the US who died during his explorations.

== Life ==
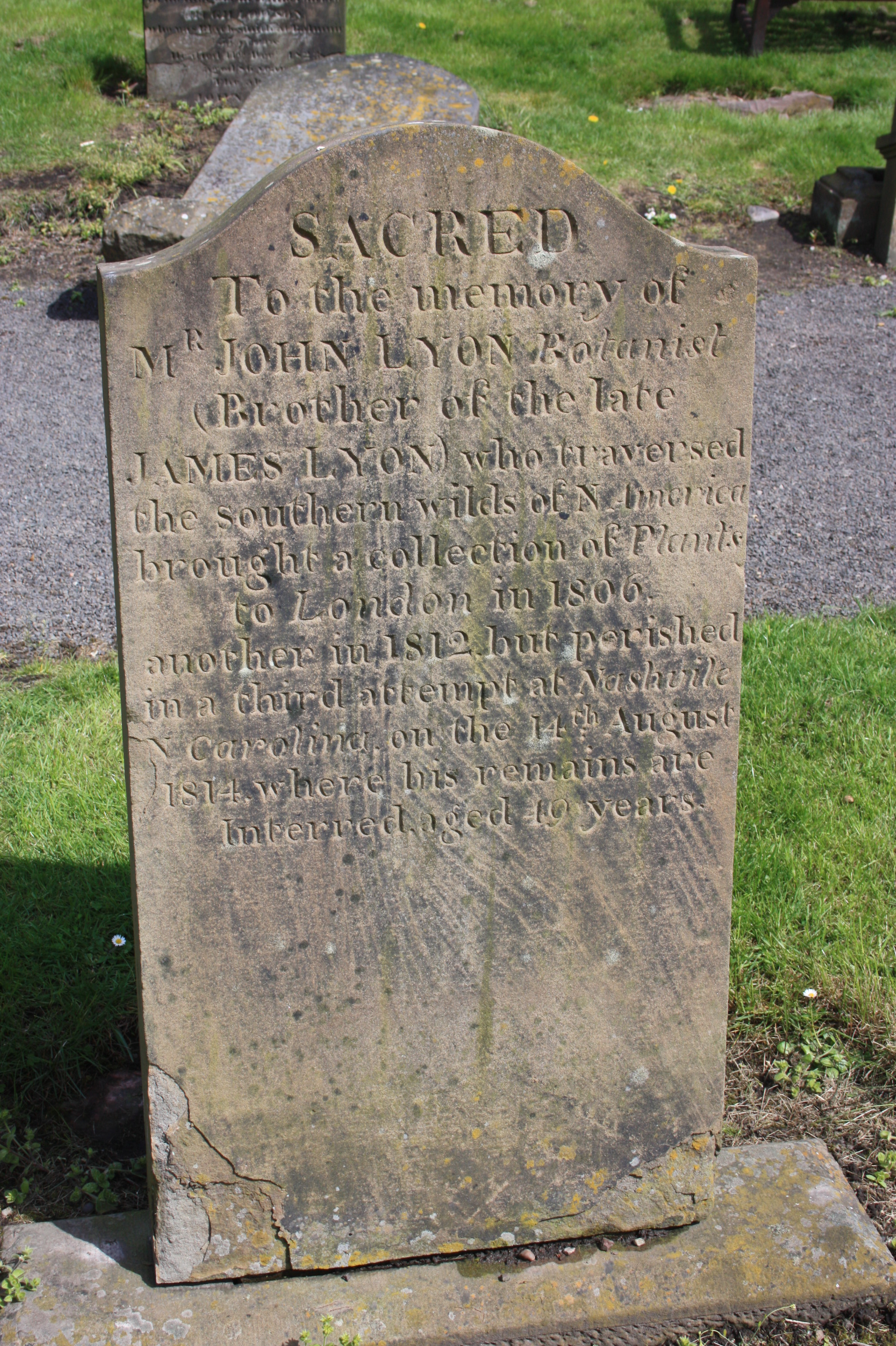
The memorial to John Lyon, the Howff Cemetery, Dundee

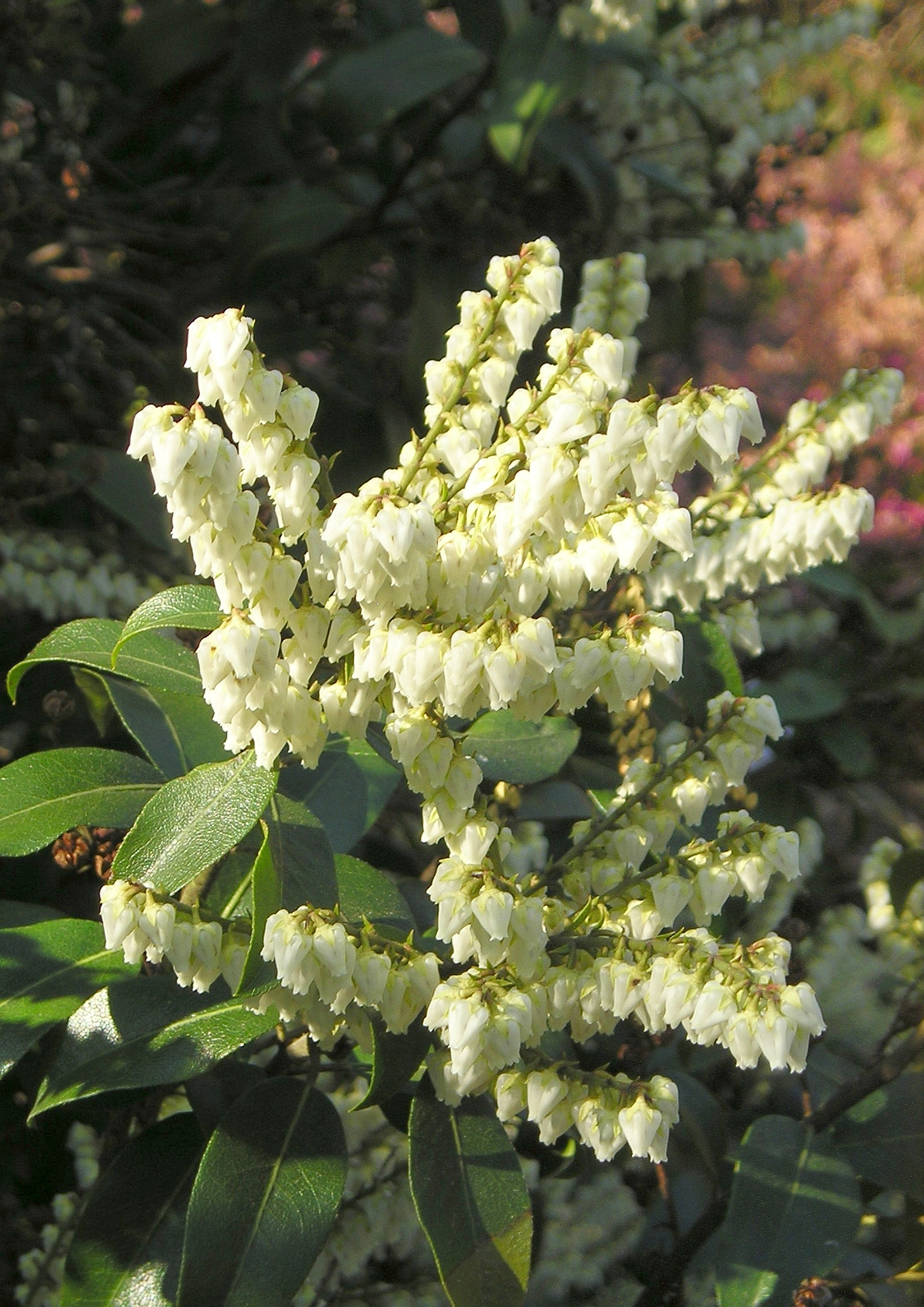
Pieris floribunda

He was born in or near Dundee where his family appear to have been involved in the blossoming jute industry there in the late 18th century. Multiple sources give his birthplace as "Gillogie" but, outwith reference to Lyon, there is no record of this place name anywhere in Scotland, so it appears to have been wrongly transcribed at some point.

In 1783 he appears as John Lyon junior, living with his father, John Lyon, a merchant on the Murraygate in east Dundee.

He appears to have trained as a nurseryman and gardener, probably on a large country estate near Dundee.

He was certainly living in Pennsylvania by 1796 when he joined William Hamilton at Woodlands near Philadelphia as Director of planting. From 1799 he began plant-collecting in the Allegheny Mountains. He did much collection in the state over the next nine years, and left the estate in 1805, being replaced

In 1806 he took a collection of plants from America to London. Returning to America the following year he began to collect more widely, concentrating on the Appalachian Mountains but ranging from Georgia to Florida. He was especially fond of western North Carolina and collected on the Roan Highlands, Grandfather Mountain and Pilot Mountain.

He died of bilious fever caught on his travels on 14 August 1814 aged only 49. He is buried in an unmarked grave in Nashville, North Carolina but is memorialised in the Howff Cemetery in central Dundee. His family were informed that he had died at Nashville on 14 August and this date is recorded on their family grave.

Some sources wrongly speculate that his grave was "found" at the Riverside Cemetery, Asheville, North Carolina. Although this is clearly a John Lyon (a common name) it has the wrong date of death and is not John Lyon the botanist. Despite the date of death being wrong (but in the correct year) the grave itself now has multiple tales spun around it as to how he ended there.

== Botanical Contribution ==
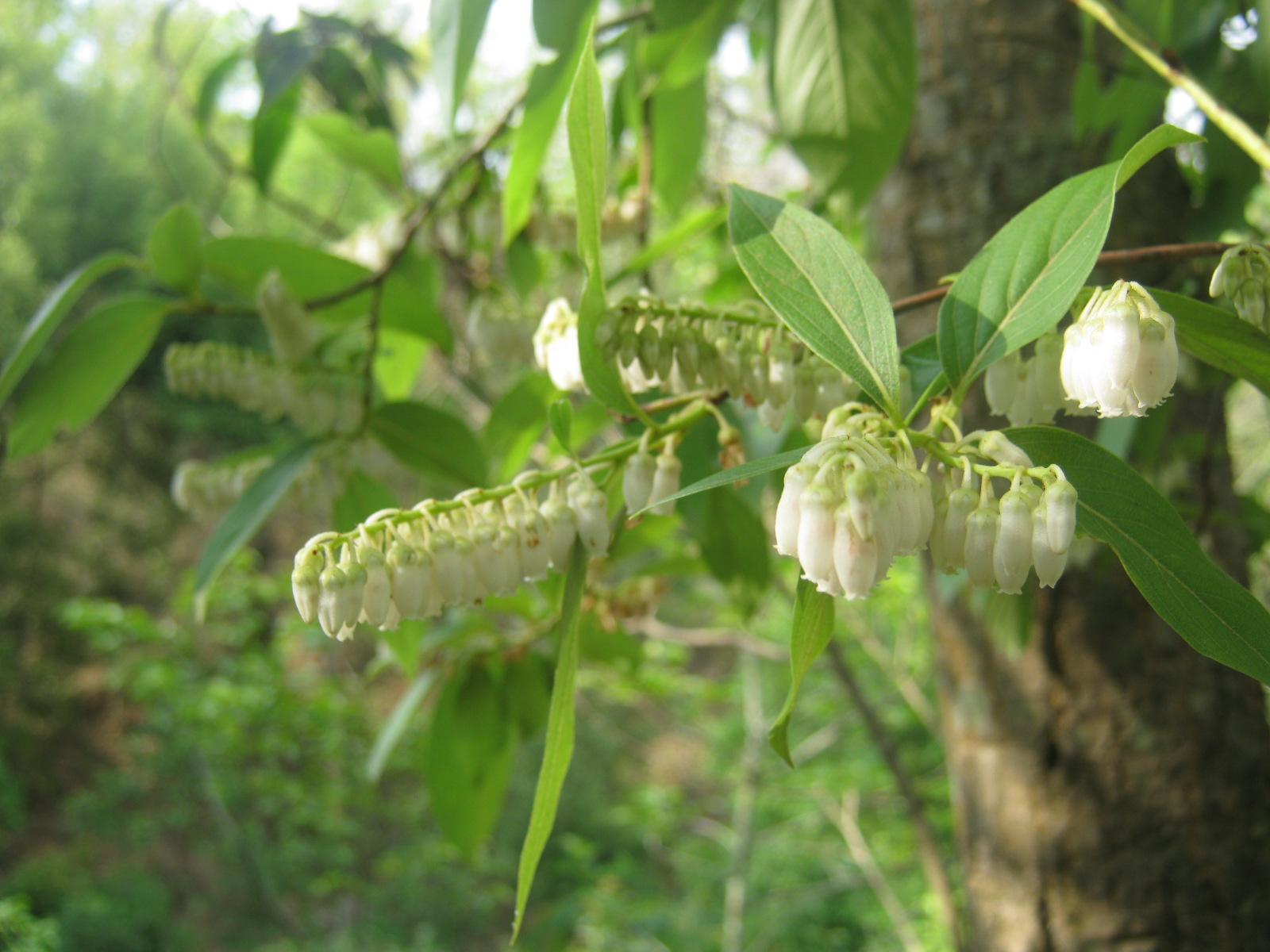
Lyonia ovalifolia Flowers

He is credited with bringing 31 new species into cultivation.

Calycanthus fertilis found in 1806.

The most popular flowering shrub which he introduced to Britain was Pieris floribunda, discovered in September 1807 and taken to Britain around 1809/10.

The Lyonia species (similar to Pieris) is named after him.
