= Murray Elder, Baron Elder =

British politician (1950–2023)

The Right Honourable The Lord Elder
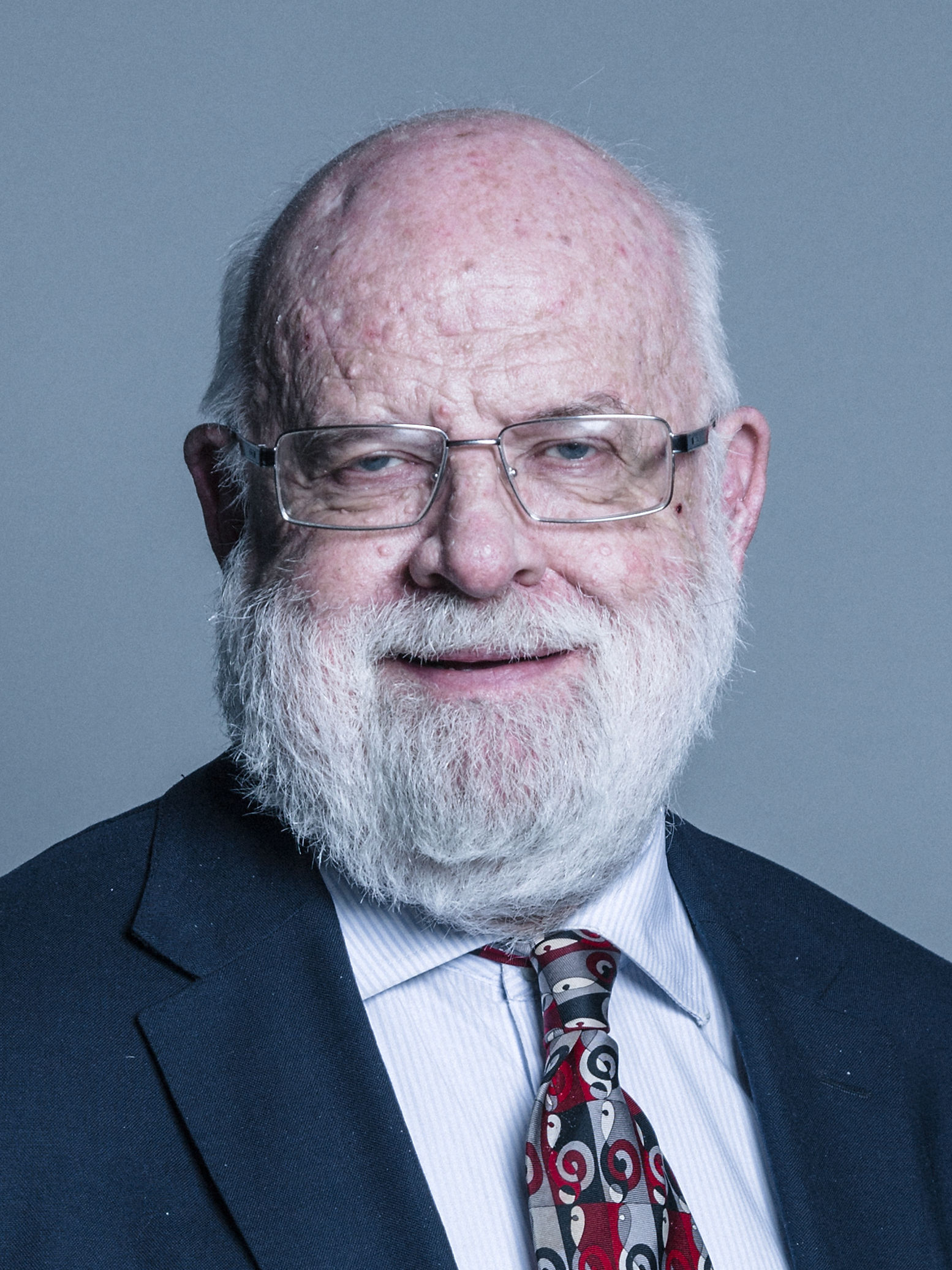
- Official portrait, 2018

Member of the House of Lords
- Lord Temporal
- Life peerage 19 July 1999 – 24 October 2023

Personal details
- Born: Thomas Murray Elder; 9 May 1950 Kirkcaldy, Scotland
- Died: 24 October 2023 (aged 73) London, England
- Party: Labour
- Education: University of Edinburgh

Thomas Murray Elder, Baron Elder (9 May 1950 – 24 October 2023), was a British Labour politician and member of the House of Lords. A childhood friend of Gordon Brown, he served as the general secretary of the Scottish Labour Party, the chief of staff to Labour leader John Smith, and a special adviser to Donald Dewar at the Scottish Office.

== Education ==
Elder was born in Kirkcaldy in 1950. He was educated at Kirkcaldy High School and graduated from the University of Edinburgh with a Master of Arts in economic history. He was a childhood friend of Gordon Brown.

== Career ==
From 1972 to 1980, Elder worked as an economist for the Bank of England. From 1984 to 1992, he was a member of the Scottish Labour Party, and from 1988 its General Secretary. He was also a Labour member of the Executive of the Scottish Constitutional Convention (1989–1992). He was the party's parliamentary candidate for Ross, Cromarty and Skye in the 1983 general election, but lost to Charles Kennedy.

Elder was the chief of staff to MP and Labour leader John Smith until Smith's death in 1994. He was a special adviser to Donald Dewar, Secretary of State for Scotland, at the Scottish Office from 1997 to 1999.

On 19 July 1999, Elder was created a life peer as Baron Elder, of Kirkcaldy in Fife, and was introduced to the House of Lords on 21 July. Peers are required to swear or affirm the oath of allegiance to the new monarch and cannot sit or vote in the House of Lords until they have done so. Following Charles III succession to the throne in September 2022, and Elder made his solemn affirmation on 19 October 2023.

Elder was the chancellor of Al-Maktoum Institute, a postgraduate research-led higher-education institute based in Dundee. Elder was investigated over the payments from the Al-Maktoum College of Higher Education and was found not to have registered payments in the correct manner. He was also investigated over the misuse of parliamentary envelopes during the dismissal of the former principal of the college.

== Personal life and death ==
Elder underwent a heart transplant in 1988; living another 35 years after the procedure, he was one of the longest-surviving heart transplant recipients. He was the third Westminster parliamentarian, after Chris Smith and Alan Haworth, to have climbed all the Munros, the Scottish 3000 ft hills. He completed his round of the 284 peaks with an ascent of Beinn Sgritheall on 9 June 2007 and was no.3897 in the Scottish Mountaineering Club's list of Munroists.

On 24 October 2023, Elder collapsed outside of the House of Lords chamber and was taken to hospital, where he died at the age of 73. The cause of death was given as heart and kidney failure.

== See also ==
- Commission on Scottish Devolution

== Sources ==
- "DodOnline". Archived from the original on 3 October 2006.
