= Clementina Stirling Graham =

Scottish hostess and author (1782–1877)

Clementina Stirling Graham (1782–1877), of Duntrune, was a Scottish hostess and author, known for her Mystifications. Her portrait hangs in the Scottish National Portrait Gallery.

== Life ==
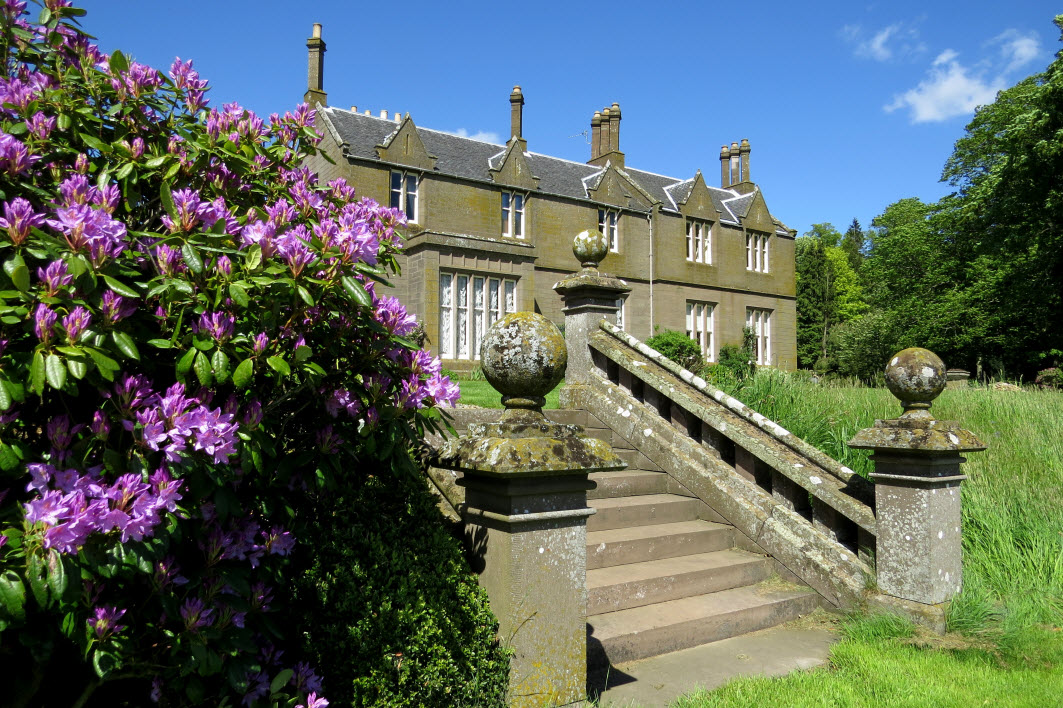
Duntrune House near Dundee

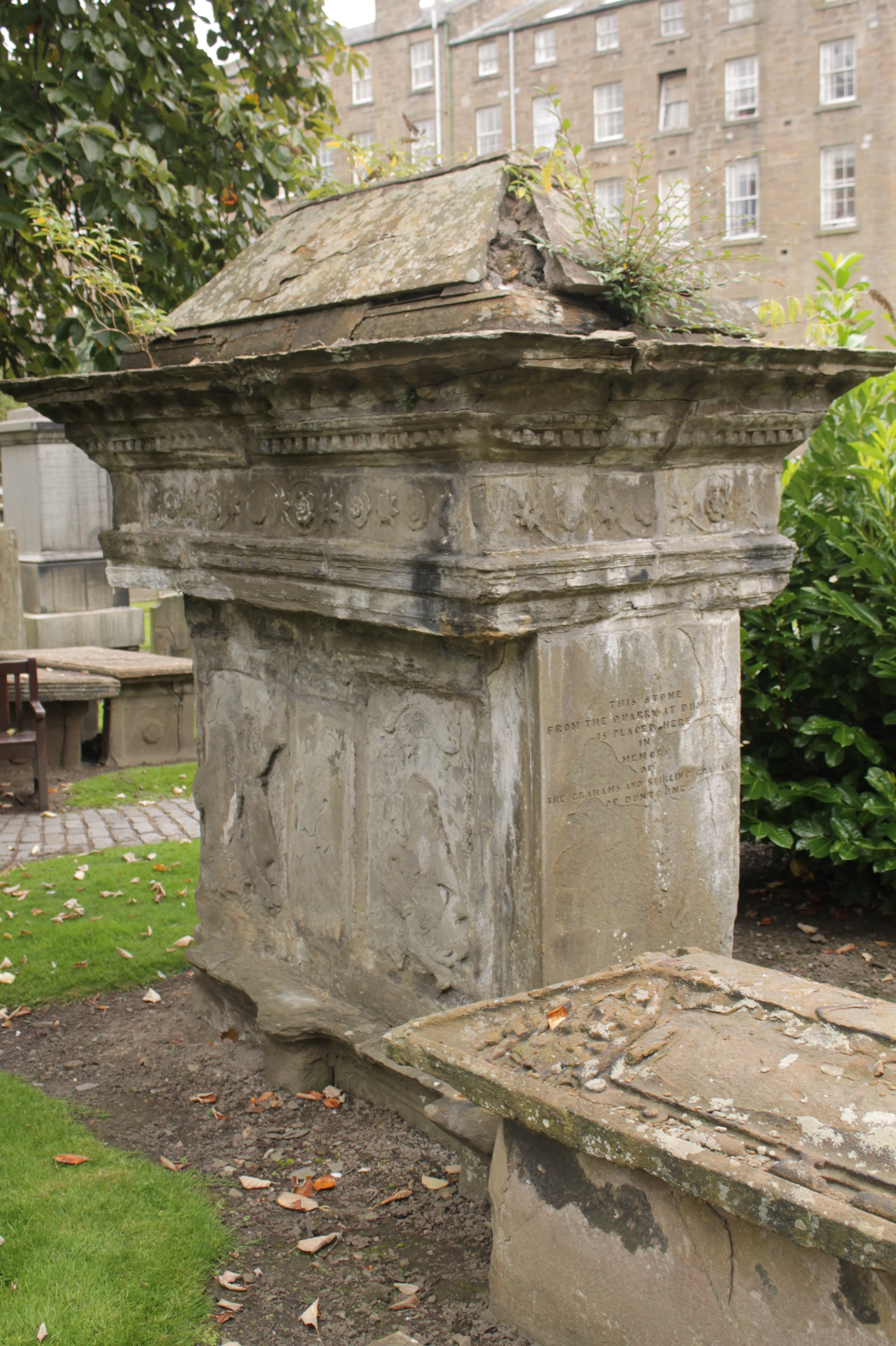
The Stirling-Graham tomb the Howff, Dundee

Clementina, born in May 1782, was the elder daughter of Patrick Stirling of Pittendriech, by his wife Amelia Graham of Duntrune, Forfarshire. Her mother succeeded to the small estate of Duntrune, near Dundee, on the death of her brother Alexander in 1802, and her husband and herself then assumed the surname of Graham. Mrs. Graham was one of four daughters of Alexander Graham of Duntrune (d. 1782), whose ancestors William and James, both active Jacobites, in 1715 and 1745 respectively assumed the title of Viscount Dundee, as the nearest representatives of their kinsman John Graham of Claverhouse, Viscount Dundee.

Her own opinions were with the Whigs, a member of the social circle of Edinburgh Whigs, of whom Francis Jeffrey and Lord Cockburn were leaders.

She lived at Duntrune House at Wellbank in Dundee which overlooked the estuary of the Tay and had a distant view of Saint Andrews. She usually spent her winters in Edinburgh where she was well known for her wit and personations.

She died 23 August 1877. She is buried in the Stirling Graham family plot in The Howff graveyard in central Dundee, which is marked by a tablet inserted into the west side of memorial No. 172 erected to William Raitt. This formally lavish tomb is situated at the Barrack Street side of the burial ground next to the footpath.

Her portrait hangs in the Scottish National Portrait Gallery.

== Works ==
In early life Miss Graham enjoyed personation, and mystified her acquaintances by presenting herself to them disguised as somebody else. The pranks she played on Jeffrey and others were recorded by her in her old age at the request of her friend Dr John Brown in the volume of Mystifications, first privately printed in 1859 together with a few poems and prose sketches. Dr Brown edited the first published edition of Mystifications in 1865. She also translated from the French and published in 1829 The Bee Preserver, by Jonas de Gelieu, a Swiss author, for which she received a medal from the Highland Society.

She also wrote some songs.

Her work is now in the public domain and some are available online.

- Mystifications
- The Bee Preserver 2nd Edition

== Archives ==
Archive Services at the University of Dundee hold a collection of papers relating to Clementina Stirling Graham.
