= Al-Maktoum College of Higher Education =

College in Dundee, UK

- Former name: Al-Maktoum Insititue of Islamic Studies
- Established: 2001
- Chairman: HE Mr Mirza Al-Sayegh
- Chancellor: Murray Elder, Baron Elder
- Location: Dundee, Scotland
- Website: https://www.almcollege.ac.uk/

Al-Maktoum College Of Higher Education is a college located in Dundee, Scotland, sponsored by Hamdan Bin Rashid Al-Maktoum, deputy ruler of Dubai and minister of finance of the United Arab Emirates. Formerly known as Al-Maktoum Institute for Arabic and Islamic Studies, the college was established in 2001, and has built a mosque at the cost of £1.3 million on its campus for the local Muslim population. The institute has its own publishing press.

== Courses ==
The college offers postgraduate programmes in the study of Islam, Economics, and Arabic. The college offered degree programs but agreements with Universities have been withdrawn, including Aberdeen. The College's partnership agreement with the university of Aberdeen was terminated in September 2012. All students previously enrolled on higher education programmes at the College were transferred to the university of Aberdeen.

== QAA oversight reports ==
The college has been reviewed by the Quality Assurance Agency for Higher Education a number of times, and since 2018 it meets UK standards.

According to the report, in January 2018 the college had 18 registered students, 6 academic staff, 5 visiting fellows, and 6 administrative staff.

== Malory Nye controversy ==
Malory Nye was principal of the college until June 2011 when he was dismissed from his post, together with his wife, Isabel Campbell-Nye, who was head of the English language centre.

The couple alleged that the director of operations, and chairman of the college's board of directors decided to force them out because they're white, British Christians, among other claims. However, all claims were dismissed at an employment tribunal in Glasgow.

The couple also lodged grievances against the chancellor of the college, the Lord, Baron Elder for his handling of the process. Lord Elder was then investigated by the House of Lords Conduct Committee and was found to have broken the House of Lords' Code of Conduct for incorrect registering of lord interest and misuse of the House of Lords stationery for his private business at the college by using a House of Lords envelope to send the former college principal his termination letter. Following the investigation, he issued an apology for his minor breaches of the Code of Conduct.
