= Alexander Riddoch =

Scottish merchant and Provost (1745–1822)

Alexander Riddoch DL (1 September 1745 – 9 December 1822) was a Scottish merchant who served eight non-consecutive terms as Provost of Dundee. His nicknames included the "Old Hawk". "The Gudeman of Blacklunans" and "Archdeacon of the Self-Elected".

In his role in Dundee he failed in his hope to create a neo-classical town in the manner of Edinburgh but nevertheless did much to change its cityscape and history.

== Life ==
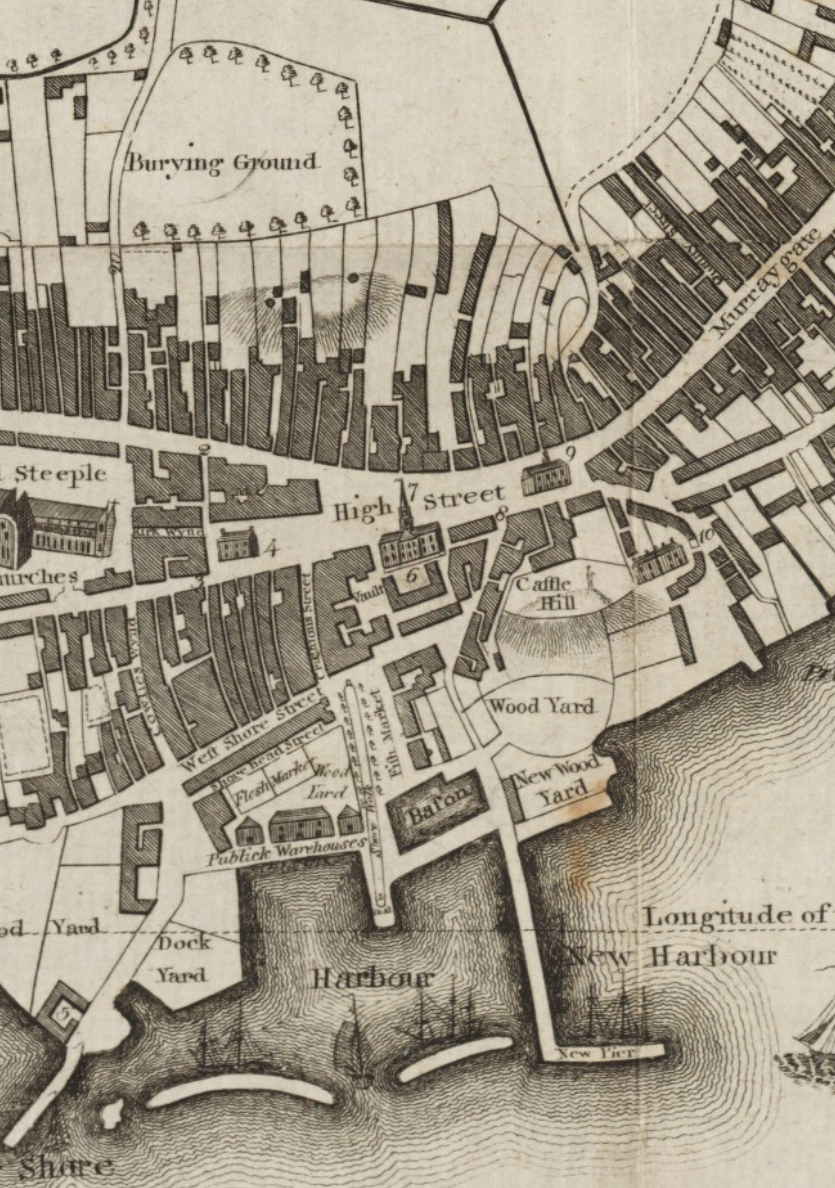
Central Dundee in 1793 showing his woodyard, house and burial place

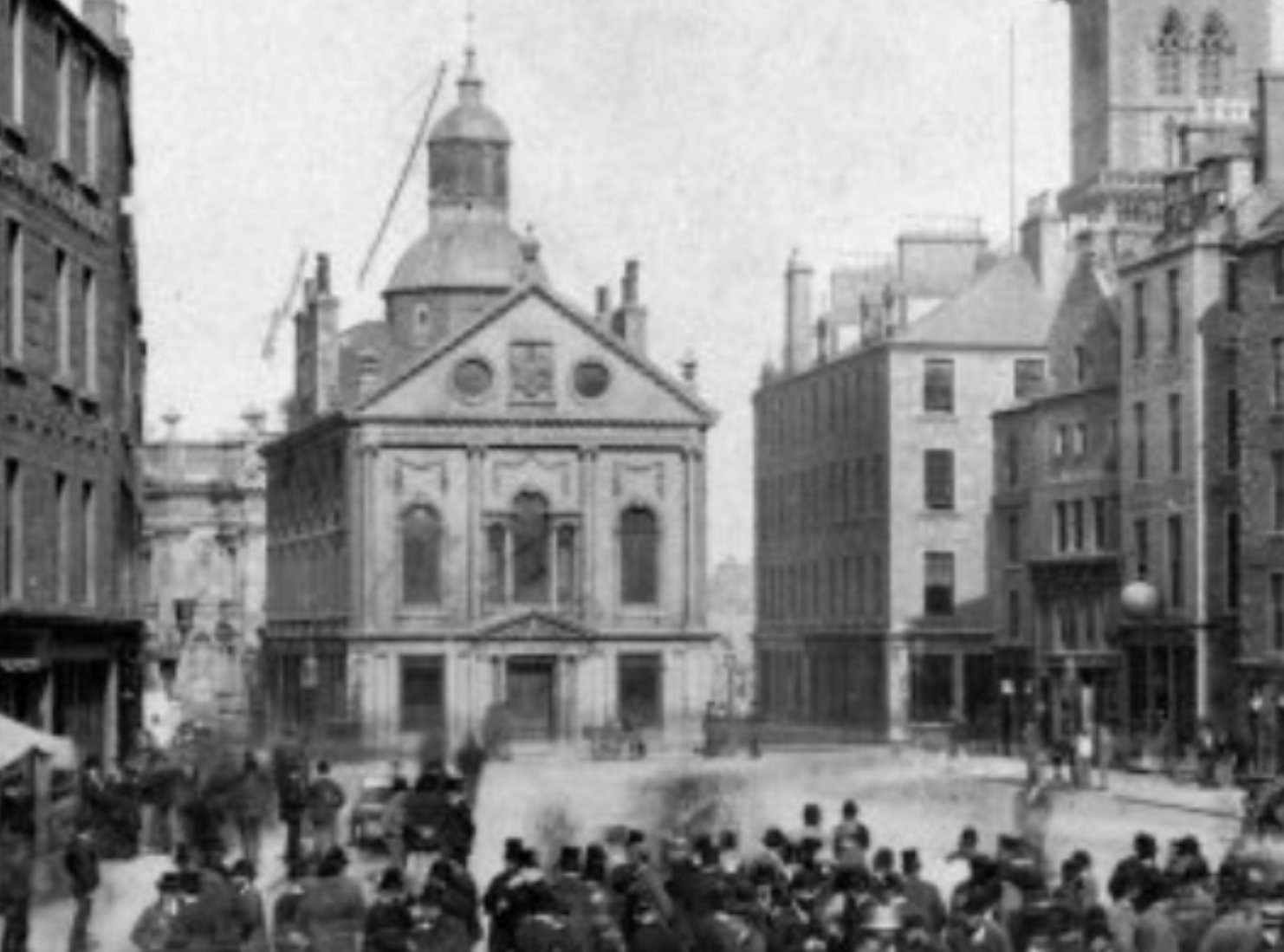
Dundee Trades Hall at the time of Riddoch

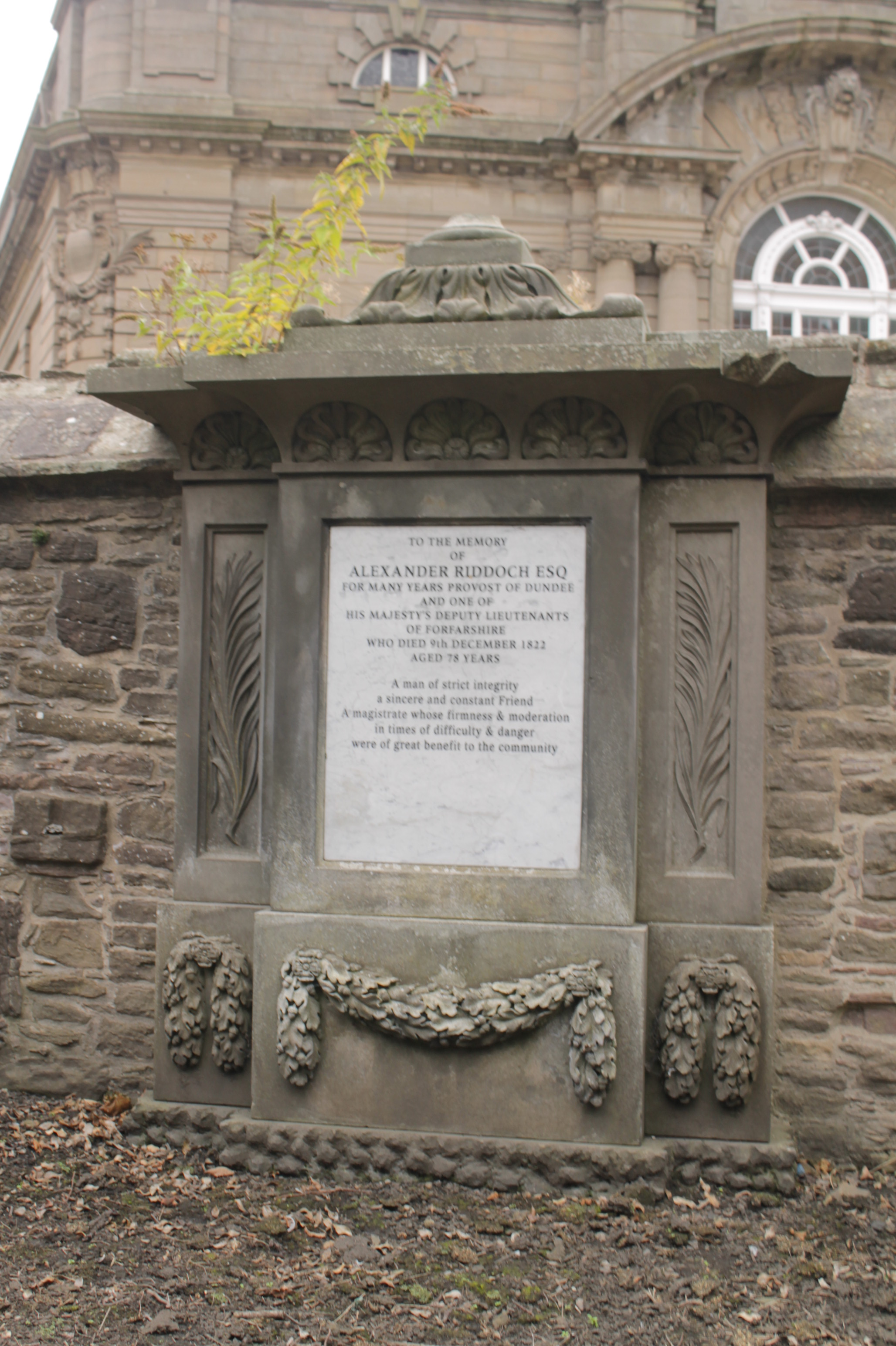
The grave of Alexander Riddoch, the Howff, Dundee

He was born at Cultybraggan Farm, just south of Comrie and west of Crieff in Perthshire on 1 September 1745, the son of John Riddoch and his wife Isobel Dow.

From 1776, he worked as a merchant in Dundee, trading in linen, spirits and oatmeal, alongside other expensive imported goods such as tea and tobacco. He loaned the town council £300 in 1778 (this was normal in those days). He was regarded as a popular and intelligent man. He joined the Town Council in September 1776 and was asked to immediately serve as Treasurer. Some projects were personally funded by the Treasurer at this time, including rebuilding "The Singing Pier" and South Pier as well as paving the roads leading to these.

In 1788 he was elected Provost in succession to John Pitcairn. Dundee operated a plan which held elections for local officials every two years, but did not allow a provost to serve two consecutive terms. Riddoch served a total of eight terms as Provost, the highest number of any official in this position, ending in 1818, and was undoubtedly one of Dundee's most popular and noteworthy politicians.

In his first term as Provost in 1789 he organised a new pier to accommodate the larger vessels being used in sea trade. In this same year he received a petition from the Dundee Reform Committee led by Patrick Stirling and Ebenezer Anderson.

In 1790 he commissioned the town architect Samuel Bell to create Nethergate House, a fine villa in central Dundee.

In Dundee, he had a close relationship with George Dempster MP, from whom it is said he acquired a rather cavalier attitude to finances and was later accused of taking financial advantage of his position, despite clear evidence that he was more than happy to support the town with his own money. Together with Dempster he founded the Dundee Commercial Banking Company in 1792.

Riddoch's term of control covered what might be considered as Dundee's heyday. Projects included the building of Dundee Infirmary and major expansion of Dundee docks. Castle Street, Tay Street and Crichton Street were built and the Nethergait was widened.

In 1793 the first flax mills appeared in Dundee (in Guthrie Street and Chapelshade) and Dundee's prosperity began to rocket.

From at least 1793, he invested in production of sailcloth, partnered with Thomas Webster of Hawkhill and Alexander Strachan (in rivalry to Mr Graham of Fintry). This specifically linked to the Royal Navy's wave of shipbuilding linked to the Napoleonic Wars. Riddoch, Webster and Strachan also jointly invested in rope-making and the whaling industry. He was partner in Thomas and Riddoch, a "twist mill" (thread mill) in the Murraygait. He also had major shares in the Wemyss mill on Seagait. He shared a timber yard with Baillie Peddie near the Castle Hill. He had a major share in the glassworks at Carolina Port.

On 16 November 1792, he was involved in a local riot where the rioters planted a "Tree of Liberty" in the High Street and obliged him (as provost) to dance around it three times reciting their dictated words: Liberty and Equality Forever".

In 1796 he bought the Blacklunans estate and, in the Scottish tradition, was thereafter addressed by the title "Blacklunans". Blacklunans lies between Blairgowrie and Braemar.

Improvements to the harbour of 1804 (sanctioned by Riddoch in his Council role) led to great criticism that Peddie and Riddoch's timber yard was hugely increased in value. It was this action which brought about his public criticism. This criticism was worsened by a two-penny tax on ale in the town to pay for the improvements. The council's expenditure on street improvements were causing considerable debt. The project was relaunched in 1810 as the Dundee Harbour Bill but was heavily opposed and a government enquiry revealed that previous harbour dues had not been re-invested in the harbour as required. This partly reflected on Riddoch as Provost but there was more evidence that his cronies had misappropriated the funds.

In the early 19th century, he came into political conflict with the local radicals, George Kinloch and Robert Rintoul. The latter became editor of the Dundee Weekly Advertiser in 1808. These radicals further divided the views of the city and accused Riddoch of not sufficiently improving the harbour to meet contemporary needs.

Meanwhile, the town improvements were becoming costly. The widening of the Nethergate met opposition amongst the wealthier owners who asked for the Sheriff to mitigate the poor sums offered by the council. The house of Alexander Garland, a wealthy tobacconist, ruled in Garland's favour and resulted in a large bill to the council. Consequently in 1811, a resolution was made to accurately revalue all heritable property in Dundee.

In 1814, as a major step towards a new harbour, Robert Stevenson was commissioned to undertake a full survey of the existing docks. The plans for a new dock continued to be opposed, not for reason of the principle, but for the proposed raising of harbour dues, and local merchants made an alternate plan which was to be run by a Harbour Trust rather than the Town Council. After some argument, Thomas Telford was appointed to execute the works in preference to Stevenson, who was thought to favour using land owned by Riddoch. However, whether persuaded by Riddoch or not, Telford concluded that a new dock was not needed. Nevertheless, the Dundee Harbour Act was eventually passed in 1815.

Riddoch stepped down as Provost permanently in 1819 aged 74, somewhat worn down by the tribulations of his later years in office and absence of public appreciation for his efforts. His final act involved a summons to London to explain his part in the alleged corruption of the Scottish burghs, a trip he made with his erstwhile rivals, Robert Rintoul and James Saunders.

He died in his house on the Nethergate on 9 December 1822 aged 78, and is buried in The Howff burial ground in central Dundee. At the time of his death he was owed £2000 by the city and various city individuals. He left £13000 in his will (the equivalent of over £1.6 million) making him the richest man in Dundee of his age.

The desired improvements of Dundee Docks were eventually undertaken in 1832 by James Leslie.

== Family ==
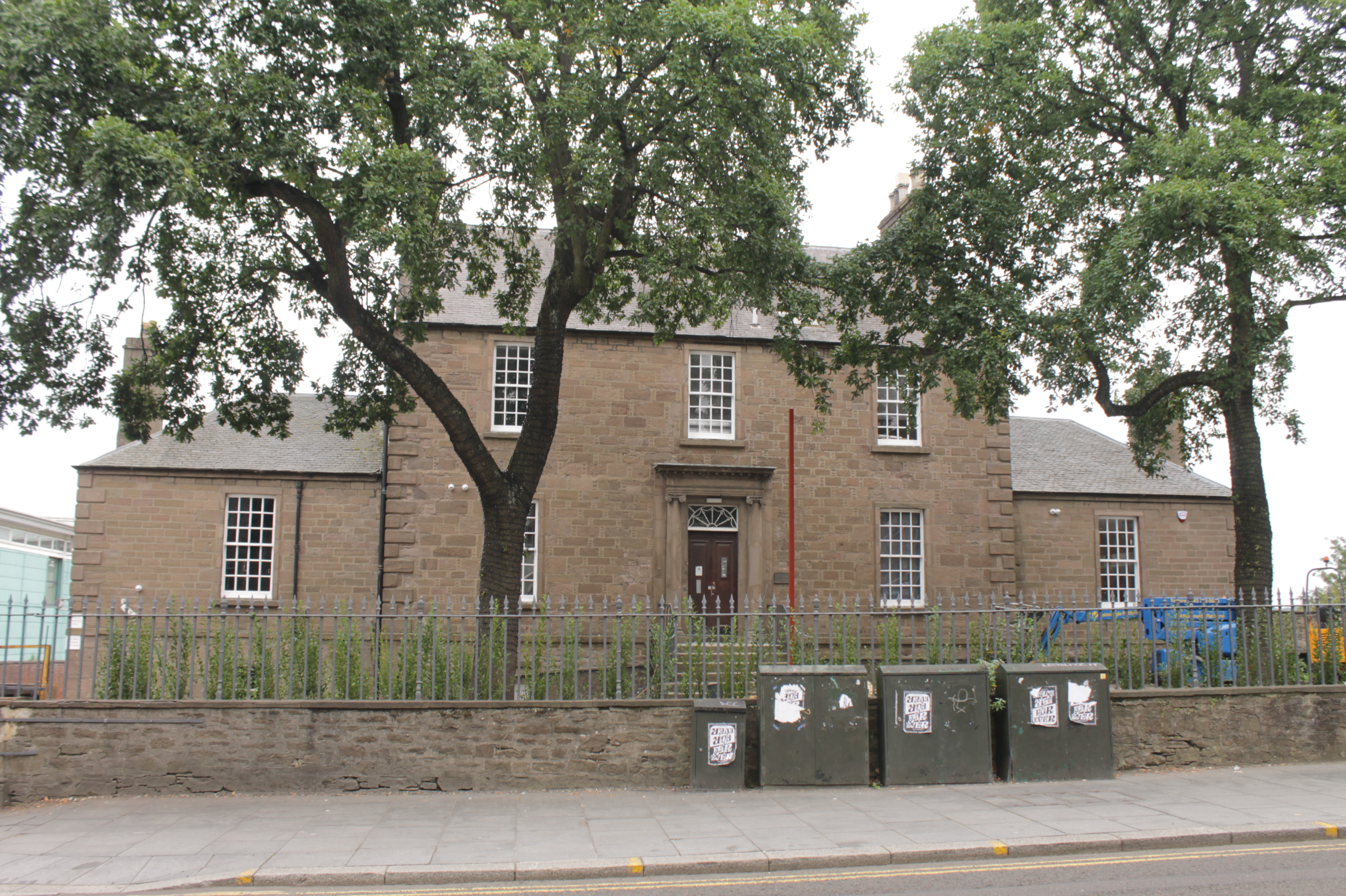
Nethergate House, Dundee

In 1768 he married Margaret Scott at Lethendy church, just north of Perth. They initially lived in Scone, Perthshire.

His first child was not born until 1776.

In 1799 (aged 54) he married Ann Morison, daughter of a local merchant. Ann was still living at Nethergate in 1830.

== Nethergate House ==
Riddoch's house was converted into a branch of the Clydesdale Bank. This closed in 2017 and in 2019 was planned to open as a restaurant. In 2026, the restaurant was re-named "Riddoch's".

Nethergate House is a category A listed building.

The building stands on the south side of the Nethergate immediately west of Dundee Contemporary Arts Centre.
