= James Halyburton (reformer) =

James Halyburton (1518 – February 1589) was a Scottish Protestant reformer.

== Life ==
He was educated at the University of St Andrews, Fife, where he graduated MA in 1538.

From 1553 to 1586 he was Provost of Dundee and a prominent figure in national life. He was chosen as one of the lords of the congregation in 1557, and commanded the contingents sent by Forfar and Fife against Elizabeth I of England in 1559. He took part in the defence of Edinburgh, and in the battles of Langside (1568) and Restalrig (1571).

He had stoutly opposed the marriage of Mary, Queen of Scots, to Lord Darnley, and when, after Restalrig, he was captured by the queen's troops, he narrowly escaped execution. He represented Morton at the conference of 1578, and was one of the royal commissioners to the General Assembly of the Church of Scotland in 1582 and again in 1588.
