= Kinnettles Castle =

Hotel in Angus, Scotland

Coordinates: 56.610082°N 2.93434°W

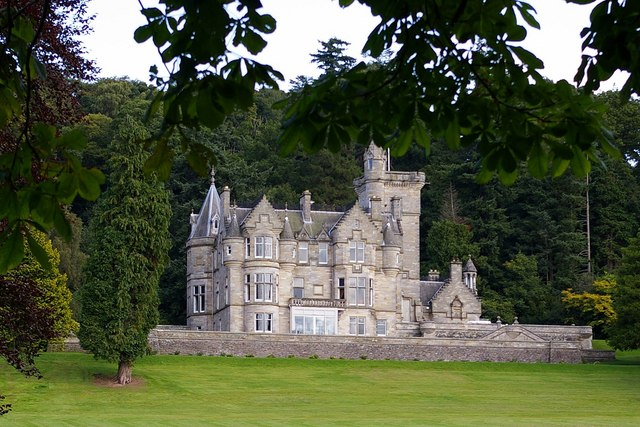
Kinnettles Castle

Kinnettles Castle is a mid-19th century period castle located in Forfar, Angus, Scotland. Set on 44 acres, the Scottish Baronial castle is now a hotel.

== History ==
In the early 14th century, King Robert III granted Alexander Strachan a tract of land in Forfar which went on to become the Kinettles baronial estate. A dated stone situated opposite the castle's dovecot suggests that a modest two-story house occupied the site from 1678.

In the 16th century, ownership of the land was passed to the Lindsays who held it for 200 years before it was passed on to Sir Thomas Moodie, the then Provost of Dundee. A survey carried out in 1791 by the Reverend David Ferney also refers to the "manor house" at Kinnettles, making mention of the fact that it is one of the oldest surviving buildings in the area. The property again traded hands in the 17th century, when it was bought by the Bower family.

In 1802, the Kinnettles estate was sold to John Aberdein Harvey who built a second manor house surrounded by fine parkland. In 1864 James Paterson bought the property and began work on the structure known today as Kinnettles Castle.

The house was bought by Joseph Grimond (grandfather of Jo Grimond) in 1875 who employed Peddie & Kinnear to remodel it.

The existing manor houses were both demolished to make room for a new castle built in the Scottish Baronial style, more as a statement of wealth than as a genuine defence. It is reported that the central tower of Kinnettles Castle was modelled on the much older Ackergill Tower located near Wick in Caithness.

Further changes were made in 1914 when the mansion house and neighbouring farms were bought by Sir James Duncan, who is said to have made ‘costly improvements’ before his brief period of ownership ended with his death some 12 years later. His trustees then sold the property in 1926 to Sir Harry Hope; the castle was occupied by the Hope family until 1960, when it was sold to the Walker-Munro family.

From the more recent ownerships the mansion house and western half of the landscape have become separated from the walled garden and eastern half of the landscape, after further refurbishment from the penultimate owners it was then leased out for a staff training facility.

The only surviving building from the original Kinnettles estate is a farmhouse that was converted into the gardener's house during Paterson's extensive remodeling works.

== Refurbishment ==
Kinnettles Castle, formerly Kinnettles House is owned by Clarenco LLP and operated under the AmaZing Venues brand name. The house was purchased in March 2011, the previous owners (who owned the Castle for 3 years) oversaw an extensive refurbishment, transforming the building from a training centre into a boutique hotel.

Since work was completed, the main body of the castle has been converted into a nine bedroom hotel. The old Gate Lodge at the entrance to the property has also been converted into a two bedroom standalone holiday cottage.

== Awards ==
Since re-opening as a hotel, Kinnettles Castle has been awarded a 5 star exclusive use rating from VisitScotland in both 2013 and 2014. It was then sold to a private equity group who announced its permanent closure in August 2026.
