= List of Darlington F.C. players =

Darlington Football Club, an English association football club based in Darlington, County Durham, was founded in 1883. They entered the FA Cup for the first time in 1885–86, were founder members of the Northern League in 1889, turned professional in 1908 and joined the North Eastern League, which they won in 1913 and 1921. The latter win preceded election to the Football League as members of its newly formed Third Division North. Runners-up in their first season, Darlington were Northern Section champions three years later, thus winning promotion to the Second Division. Their 15th-place finish in 1926 remains their best League performance, and they were relegated back to the Third Division the following year. After 68 years of continuous membership, they were relegated from the Football League in 1988–89. Having made an immediate return as Conference champions, they remained in the League until 2010, when they again dropped into the Conference. After Darlington failed to exit administration in a manner acceptable to the Football Association, that body treated it as a new club, required it to change its name (to Darlington 1883), and placed its team in the Northern League, the ninth tier of English football, for the 2012–13 season. Five years later, the FA approved the club's request to resume its traditional name.

The club's first team have competed in numerous nationally organised competitions, and all players who have played in 100 or more such matches, either as a member of the starting eleven or as a substitute, are listed below. Each player's details include the duration of his Darlington career, his typical playing position while with the club, and the number of games played and goals scored in domestic league matches and in all senior competitive matches. Where applicable, the list also includes the national team for which the player was selected, and the number of senior international caps he won.

== Introduction ==
Of the more than 150 men who made 100 or more appearances in nationally organised league competition for Darlington, Alan Walsh and Jerry Best are first and second in the club's all-time scorers list. Davie Brown scored a club record 39 league goals in a single season, from 40 matches in 1924–25 as Darlington were promoted to the Second Division for the only time in their history. Frank Gray, Ken Hale and Billy Horner went on to manage the club, while Craig Liddle and Neil Maddison had several spells as caretaker manager.

Other players took part in significant matches in the history of the club. On the opening day of the 1921–22 season, Tommy Winship crossed for Bill Hooper to score Darlington's first Football League goal, against Halifax Town; the goal came so quickly that the Northern Echo reported how Hooper could "in all probability, lay claim to the honour of being the first player to score a goal in the Northern Section of the Third Division". Hughie Dickson scored the second with a penalty kick to make the score 2–0, and George Malcolm and Tommy Greaves also played in the match. Dan Cassidy scored the last-seconds winner to defeat Stockport County in the inaugural Northern Section Cup final in 1934. Dave Carr and Keith Morton scored two of the goals that earned Darlington a draw with Chelsea, League champions only three seasons earlier, in the fourth round of the 1958–59 FA Cup, and Carr scored again as Darlington won the replay 4–1 to progress to the last 16 of the competition for only the second time in their history. Ray Yeoman captained the team to promotion from the Fourth Division in 1965–66, and Ian Miller was captain and Paul Arnison, Liam Hatch and Sam Russell also played as Darlington won the 2011 FA Trophy Final.

Ten men listed here – goalkeeper Mark Prudhoe, defenders Ron Greener, Liddle, Kevan Smith and John Peverell, midfielders Andy Toman, Alan Sproates and David McLean, and forwards Walsh and Colin Sinclair – were voted by supporters into a "Dream Team" as part of the 2003 Farewell to Feethams celebrations, when the club left its long-time home. The eleventh man, Marco Gabbiadini, played only 98 times for Darlington. Ron Ferguson's goal that eliminated Sheffield Wednesday from the 1976–77 FA Cup was chosen best goal ever scored at the ground.

== Key ==
- The list is ordered first by number of appearances in total, then by number of League appearances, and then if necessary by date of debut.
- Appearances as a substitute are included.
- Statistics are correct up to 1 July 2024, the first day of the 2023–24 season. Where a player left the club permanently after this date, his statistics are updated to his date of leaving.

Positions key
| Pre-1960s | | 1960s– | |
|---|---|---|---|
| GK | Goalkeeper | | |
| FB | Full back | DF | Defender |
| HB | Half-back | MF | Midfielder |
| FW | Forward | | |

Player
Players marked * were registered for the club as at the date specified above.
Players with name in italics and marked † were on loan from another club for the duration of their Darlington career. The loaning club is noted in the Notes column, and sourced to Neil Brown's Player Database, to the English National Football Archive, or individually.
Position
Playing positions are listed according to the tactical formations that were employed at the time. Thus the change in the names of defensive and midfield positions reflects the tactical evolution that occurred from the 1960s onwards.
Club career
Club career is defined as the first and last calendar years in which the player appeared for the club in any of the competitions listed below.
League appearances and League goals
League appearances and goals comprise those in the Football League (1921–1989 and 1990–2010), the Football Conference (1989–1990 and 2010–2012) and the National League (2016–present). Appearances in the 1939–40 Football League season, abandoned after three matches because of the Second World War, are excluded. (Note: For matches up until the end of 1999–2000: Tweddle (2000), pp. 15, 23–110.; For 2000–01 to 2009–10: "Clubs: Darlington". English National Football Archive. Select season required via dropdown menu, then Season players tab.; For 2010–11 and 2011–12: League: "Club statistics". Darlington F.C. Archived from the original on 17 November 2015. Select season and statistic required via dropdown menus.; For 2010–11 FA Cup and FA Trophy: Match reports linked from "Fixtures 2010/2011 season". Darlington F.C. Archived from the original on 17 November 2015.; For 2011–12 FA Cup and FA Trophy: Stoddart, Craig (10 December 2011). "Quakers' hold on the Trophy is over". The Northern Echo. Darlington. Archived from the original on 20 December 2022.; Walker, Martin (29 October 2011). "Darlington 1 Hinckley United 1". Darlington F.C.; "Hinckley United vs. Darlington 3–0". Soccerway. Perform Group. Archived from the original on 8 July 2023.; For 2013–14 FA Trophy: "Ossett Town v. Darlington". darlofc.co.uk.; "Buxton v. Darlington". darlofc.co.uk.; "Darlington v. Buxton". darlofc.co.uk.; For 2014–15 FA Cup and FA Trophy: "Goals and appearances". Darlington 1883. Archived from the original on 29 May 2015.; For 2015–16 FA Cup and FA Trophy: "Darlington v Hyde United (FA Cup 1Q)". Darlington 1883. Archived from the original on 2 April 2016.; "Darlington v Mossley (FA Trophy)". Darlington 1883. Archived from the original on 2 April 2016.; Stoddart, Craig (14 November 2015). "Disappointment for Darlington with defeat in FA Trophy – and White sent off again". The Northern Echo. Darlington. Archived from the original on 8 July 2023.; For 2016–17: "Goals and appearances 2016–17". Darlington 1883. Archived from the original on 25 May 2017.; For 2017–18: "Goals and appearances Season 2017–18". Darlington F.C. Archived from the original on 2 May 2018.; For 2018–19 onwards, except where sourced below: "Darlington FC: Squad 2018/2019". Soccerway. Perform Group. Select season and competition required via dropdown menu.; For 2018–19 cup appearances: "Statistics: Season 2018–2019". Darlington F.C. Archived from the original on 28 April 2019.; For 2019–20 FA Cup 2nd and 3rd qualifying rounds and FA Trophy qualifying round: Simpson, Ray (21 September 2019). "Quakers win first FA Cup tie in five years". Darlington F.C. Archived from the original on 23 September 2019.; Simpson, Ray (5 October 2019). "Tyrone and Justin put Quakers through". Darlington F.C. Archived from the original on 6 October 2019.; Simpson, Ray (23 November 2019). "Sub Justin scores the winner". Darlington F.C. Archived from the original on 7 January 2021.; For 2020–21 FA Cup 2nd and 3rd qualifying rounds: Simpson, Ray (3 October 2020). "Quakers win penalty shootout to go through in Cup". Darlington F.C. Archived from the original on 8 November 2022.; Simpson, Ray (13 October 2020). "Early Liddle goal sets up Quakers goal spree". Darlington F.C. Archived from the original on 13 April 2023.; For 2021–22 FA Cup 2nd qualifying round: Simpson, Ray (18 September 2021). "Quakers held to a goalless draw in FA Cup". Darlington F.C. Archived from the original on 20 September 2021.; Simpson, Ray (21 September 2021). "Quakers knocked out of Cup by lucky goal". Darlington F.C. Archived from the original on 24 October 2021.; For 2022–23 FA Cup 2nd and 3rd qualifying rounds: "Becky's hat trick puts Quakers into the next round". Darlington F.C. 17 September 2022. Archived from the original on 20 September 2022.; Simpson, Ray (1 October 2022). "Quakers beaten by second half goal at Hyde". Darlington F.C. Archived from the original on 7 October 2022.; For 2023–24 FA Cup 2nd and 3rd qualifying rounds: "Emirates FA Cup Second Qualifying Round – Darlington 3–1 Workington AFC". Football Web Pages. Archived from the original on 11 October 2023.; Simpson, Ray (30 September 2023). "Scarborough go through with late penalty". Darlington F.C. Archived from the original on 11 October 2023.)
Total appearances and Total goals
Total appearances and goals comprise those in the Football League (including play-offs), Football Conference, National League, FA Cup, Football League Third Division North Cup, Football League Cup, Associate Members' Cup/Football League Trophy, FA Trophy and Conference League Cup. Matches in wartime competitions are excluded.
International selection
Countries are listed only for players who have been selected for international football. Only the highest level of international competition is given, except where a player competed for more than one country, in which case the highest level reached for each country is shown.

== Players with 100 or more appearances ==
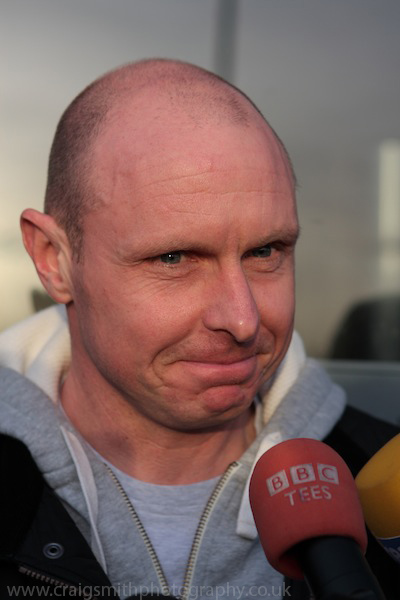
Craig Liddle made more than 300 appearances for Darlington, and was caretaker manager during their last season under the Darlington F.C. name.

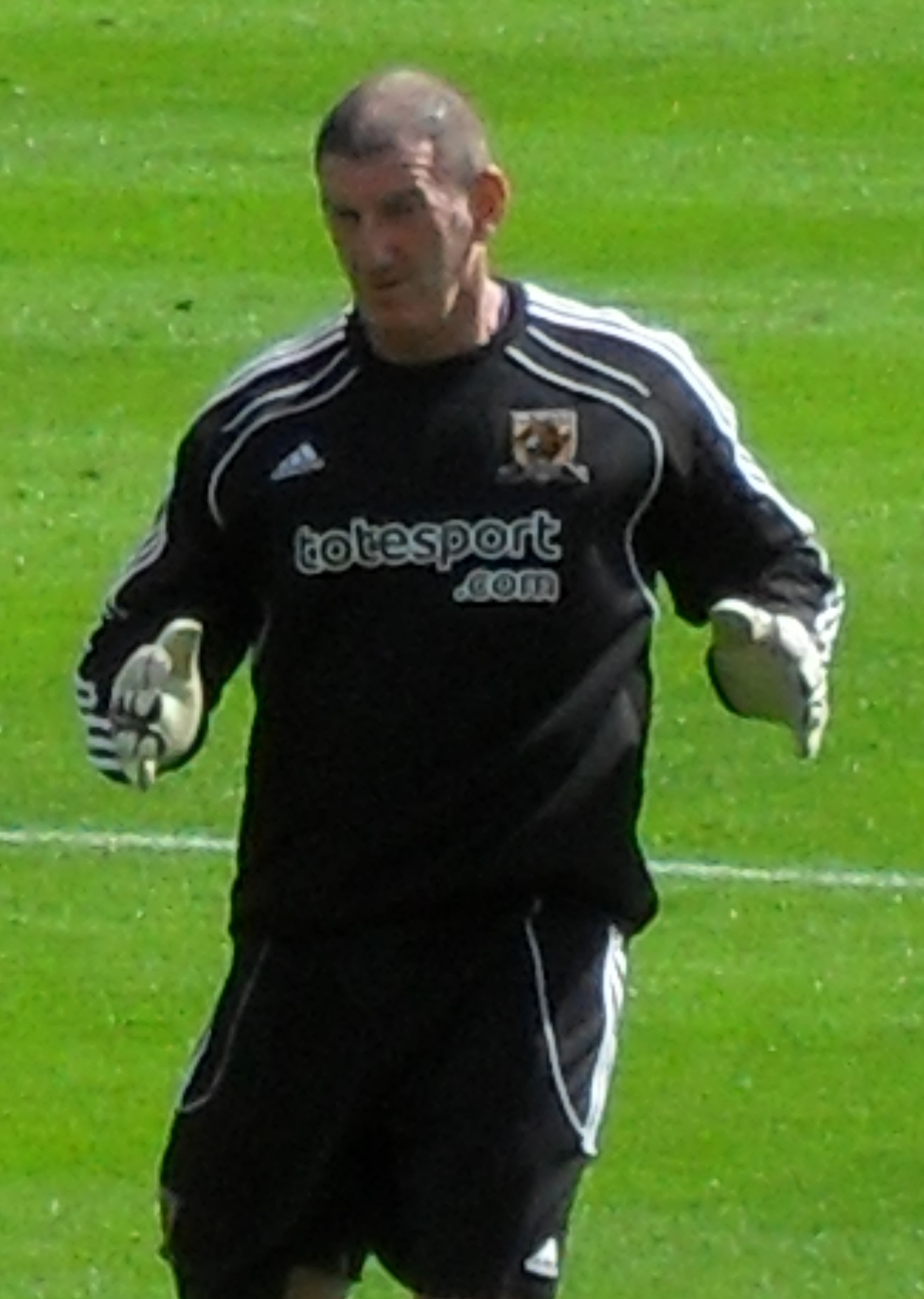
Mark Prudhoe won the 1989–90 Football Conference and 1990–91 Fourth Division titles with Darlington.

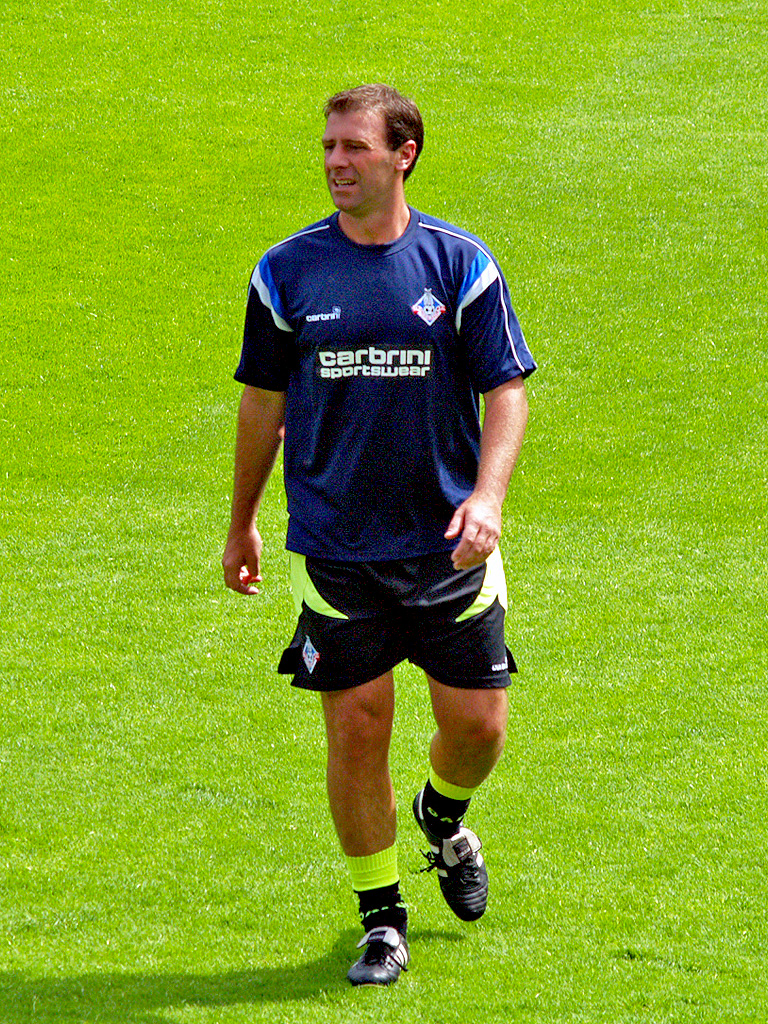
Sean Gregan returned to Darlington as player-coach in 2012, 16 years after leaving for Preston North End.

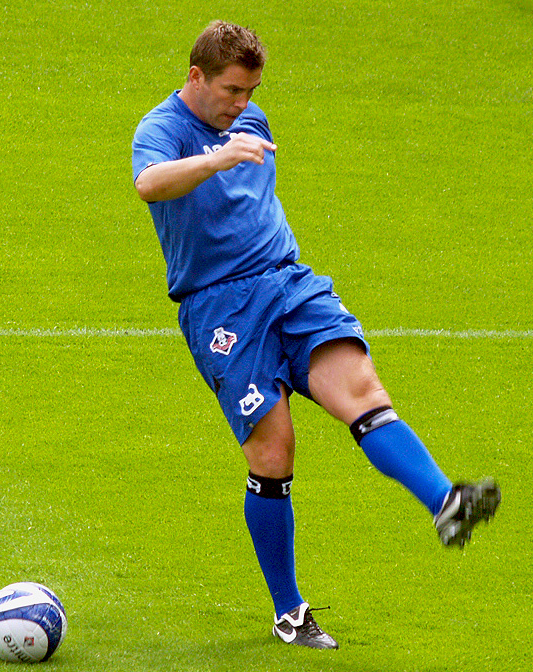
After Andy Collett's playing career ended through injury, he stayed on with Darlington as goalkeeping coach.

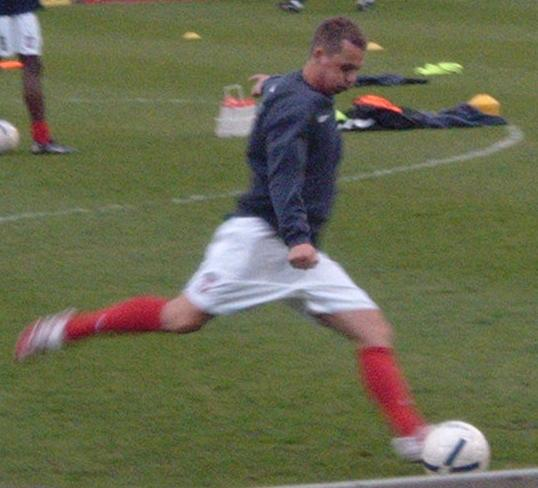
Mark Convery was man of the match in Darlington's last match in the Football League, against Dagenham & Redbridge on 8 May 2010.

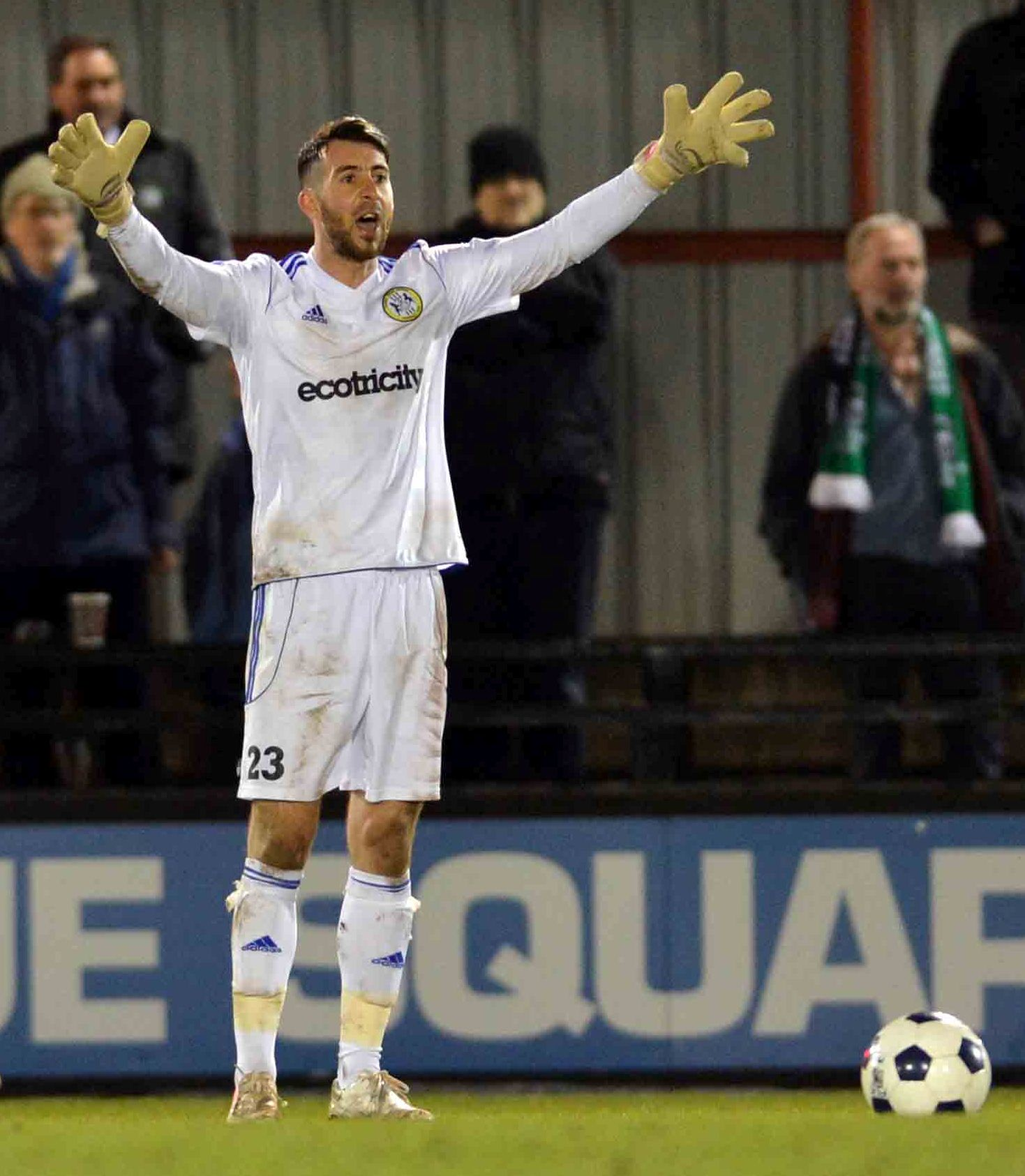
After Darlington's 2010 relegation to the Conference, Sam Russell returned for a third spell with the club. He was in goal, as Darlington won the 2011 FA Trophy Final.

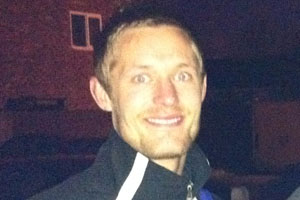
Ian Miller captained Darlington's 2011 FA Trophy-winning team.

Table of players, including playing position, club statistics and international selection
| Player | Pos | Club career | League | | Total | | International selection | Refs |
| Player | Pos | Club career | Apps | Goals | Apps | Goals | International selection | Refs |
|---|---|---|---|---|---|---|---|---|
| Ron Greener | DF | 1955–1967 | 439 | 5 | 490 | 6 | — | |
| John Peverell | DF | 1961–1972 | 419 | 13 | 465 | 14 | — | |
| Brian Henderson | FB | 1952–1964 | 423 | 3 | 463 | 3 | — | |
| Kevan Smith | DF | 1979–1985; 1989–1993 | 382 | 19 | 440 | 22 | — | |
| Hughie Dickson | HB / FB | 1919–1934 | 402 | 37 | 440 | 46 | — | |
| Billy Dunn | GK | 1945–1956 | 340 | 0 | 359 | 0 | — | |
| Ken Furphy | HB | 1953–1962 | 316 | 6 | 349 | 8 | — | |
| Clive Nattress | DF | 1972–1980; 1985 | 303 | 15 | 346 | 15 | — | |
| Alan Sproates | MF | 1965–1974 | 315 | 17 | 343 | 19 | — | (Note: Content sourced to the English National Football Archive because of typo or inconsistency in Tweddle (2000).) |
| David McLean | MF | 1979–1986 | 294 | 46 | 337 | 52 | English schools | |
| Craig Liddle | DF | 1998–2005 | 285 | 17 | 322 | 21 | — | (Note: Middlesbrough) |
| Neil Wainwright | MF | 2000; 2001–2008; 2012 | 264 | 28 | 292 | 30 | — | (Note: Sunderland) |
| Alan Walsh | FW | 1978–1984 | 251 | 87 | 279 | 100 | — | |
| Bill Rutherford | HB | 1952–1959 | 251 | 3 | 269 | 4 | — | |
| Tony Moor | GK | 1965–1972 | 239 | 0 | 268 | 0 | — | |
| Jimmy Cochrane | DF | 1975–1980 | 223 | 5 | 257 | 6 | — | |
| Jimmy Waugh | HB | 1927–1933 | 236 | 10 | 252 | 11 | — | |
| Steven Gaughan | MF | 1992–1996; 1997–1999 | 218 | 18 | 252 | 19 | — | |
| Joe Davison | FB | 1947–1954 | 240 | 7 | 249 | 8 | — | |
| Glenn Naylor | FW | 1995; 1996–2003 | 213 | 47 | 248 | 54 | — | (Note: York City) |
| Tommy Greaves | FB | 1921–1927 | 227 | 1 | 245 | 1 | — | |
| Phil Brumwell | MF | 1995–2000; 2000–2002 | 199 | 1 | 238 | 4 | — | |
| Billy Horner | DF | 1969–1975 | 218 | 5 | 236 | 5 | — | |
| Lance Robson | FW | 1960–1964; 1968–1970 | 213 | 66 | 235 | 72 | — | |
| Ryan Valentine | FB | 2002–2006; 2008–2009 | 210 | 4 | 227 | 4 | Wales U21 | |
| Brian Atkinson | MF | 1996–2002 | 193 | 12 | 224 | 15 | England U21 | |
| Colin Sinclair | FW | 1971–1976 | 203 | 59 | 223 | 65 | Scotland youth | |
| Derek Craig | DF | 1975–1980 | 187 | 10 | 214 | 16 | — | |
| Andy Crosby | DF | 1993–1998 | 181 | 3 | 211 | 4 | — | |
| Mark Prudhoe | GK | 1989–1993 | 180 | 0 | 209 | 0 | — | |
| Les O'Neill | MF | 1965–1970 | 180 | 35 | 201 | 43 | — | |
| Simon Shaw | DF | 1992–1998 | 176 | 12 | 199 | 14 | England semi-pro | |
| Sam Russell | GK | 2002; 2004–2007; 2010–2012 | 173 | 0 | 196 | 0 | — | |
| Dick Strang | HB | 1933–1938 | 171 | 2 | 196 | 3 | — | |
| Garry MacDonald | FW | 1984–1989 | 162 | 35 | 196 | 47 | — | |
| Clark Keltie | MF | 2002–2008; 2012 | 176 | 9 | 194 | 11 | — | |
| Keith Morton | FW | 1955–1961 | 171 | 49 | 194 | 55 | — | |
| George Malcolm | HB | 1919–1925 | 166 | 7 | 189 | 7 | — | |
| Ken Hale | FW | 1968–1972 | 173 | 25 | 188 | 28 | — | |
| Joe Rayment | MF | 1959–1965 | 173 | 31 | 187 | 35 | — | |
| Matt Clarke | DF | 2002–2006; 2006 | 171 | 13 | 186 | 13 | — | (Note: Bradford City) |
| John Eves | FB | 1946–1952 | 176 | 1 | 184 | 1 | — | |
| Adam Reed | DF | 1991–1995; 1997; 1998–2002 | 160 | 3 | 184 | 3 | — | (Note: Blackburn Rovers) |
| Andy Toman | MF | 1989–1993 | 155 | 17 | 183 | 22 | — | |
| Joe Hodgson | HB | 1934–1939 | 160 | 2 | 181 | 2 | — | |
| Michael Oliver | MF | 1996–2000 | 151 | 14 | 179 | 15 | — | |
| Dan Cassidy | HB / FW | 1927–1937 | 165 | 15 | 178 | 19 | — | |
| Brian Keeble | DF | 1965–1969 | 154 | 2 | 176 | 2 | — | |
| Martin Joyce | FB | 1921–1927 | 166 | 0 | 175 | 0 | — | |
| Gary Morgan | DF | 1985–1989 | 146 | 3 | 175 | 3 | — | |
| Norman Parsley | HB | 1945–1952 | 161 | 14 | 174 | 14 | — | |
| Mark Hine | MF | 1986–1990 | 149 | 14 | 174 | 17 | England semi-pro | |
| Stephen Thompson | MF / FW | 2013–2020 | 149 | 34 | 174 | 41 | — | |
| Tommy Varty | FW | 1945–1950 | 162 | 32 | 173 | 33 | — | |
| Joe Jacques | HB | 1965–1969 | 154 | 5 | 173 | 6 | — | |
| Gary Himsworth | MF | 1993–1996; 1999–2000 | 142 | 9 | 171 | 11 | — | |
| Tommy Winship | FW | 1919–1926 | 146 | 17 | 170 | 21 | — | |
| Mark Barnard | DF | 1995–1999 | 143 | 4 | 170 | 5 | — | |
| Tom Alderson | FW | 1933–1936; 1938–1939 | 151 | 46 | 169 | 60 | — | |
| Tom Kelly | HB / FB | 1938–1951 | 157 | 3 | 169 | 3 | — | |
| Ian Miller | MF | 2007; 2007–2011 | 149 | 9 | 168 | 10 | — | (Note: Ipswich Town) |
| Fred Hopkinson | HB | 1928–1933 | 158 | 10 | 167 | 10 | — | |
| Jim Milner | FW | 1957–1961 | 149 | 27 | 167 | 28 | — | |
| Roy Brown | FB | 1947–1956 | 158 | 20 | 164 | 22 | — | |
| Fred Barber | GK | 1983–1986 | 135 | 0 | 163 | 0 | — | |
| Sean Gregan | DF | 1991–1996 | 136 | 4 | 162 | 5 | — | |
| Geoff Barker | DF | 1971–1975 | 151 | 6 | 161 | 6 | — | |
| Terry Galbraith | DF / MF | 2013–2020 | 135 | 15 | 159 | 17 | — | |
| Ben Hedley * | MF | 2019–present | 135 | 0 | 159 | 1 | — | |
| Bill Hooper | FW | 1920–1926 | 141 | 60 | 157 | 64 | — | |
| Trevor Atkinson | HB | 1963–1968 | 139 | 3 | 156 | 3 | — | |
| Billy Robinson | HB | 1922–1927 | 143 | 0 | 155 | 0 | — | |
| Jimmy Lawton | FW | 1961–1965; 1968–1969 | 142 | 63 | 155 | 71 | — | |
| Brian Albeson | DF | 1967–1971 | 136 | 2 | 154 | 2 | England youth | |
| Jarrett Rivers * | FW | 2019–present | 131 | 9 | 153 | 15 | — | |
| Jimmy Willis | DF | 1988–1991 | 128 | 7 | 151 | 8 | — | |
| Phil Lloyd | DF | 1984–1987 | 127 | 3 | 150 | 5 | — | |
| Barry Conlon | FW | 2001–2004; 2006 | 134 | 45 | 148 | 48 | Republic of Ireland U21 | |
| Peter Carr | DF | 1968–1972 | 135 | 1 | 147 | 1 | — | |
| Les McJannet | FB | 1988–1992 | 125 | 6 | 147 | 11 | — | |
| David Crosson | DF | 1976–1980 | 128 | 2 | 146 | 2 | — | |
| Herbert Brown | FB | 1928–1932 | 139 | 7 | 145 | 7 | — | |
| Dave Carr | FW | 1957–1962 | 132 | 50 | 145 | 57 | — | |
| George Stevens | FW | 1920–1925 | 130 | 38 | 145 | 42 | — | |
| Andy Collett | GK | 1999–2003 | 125 | 0 | 145 | 0 | — | |
| Alan Kamara | DF | 1980–1983 | 134 | 1 | 144 | 1 | — | |
| Harry Clark | FW | 1950–1957 | 141 | 27 | 143 | 27 | — | |
| Paul Ward | MF | 1985–1988 | 124 | 9 | 143 | 11 | — | |
| Matty Appleby | DF | 1993–1994; 1994–1996; 2005–2006 | 125 | 8 | 142 | 12 | — | (Note: Newcastle United) |
| Steve Tupling | MF | 1984–1987; 1992 | 122 | 8 | 142 | 10 | — | |
| Eric Young | MF | 1974–1978 | 130 | 15 | 141 | 15 | England youth | |
| Harry Bell | HB | 1955–1959 | 126 | 19 | 141 | 23 | — | |
| Dennis Wann | MF | 1976–1979 | 121 | 13 | 141 | 15 | — | |
| John Stone | DF | 1976–1979 | 120 | 14 | 141 | 15 | — | |
| John Borthwick | FW | 1989–1992 | 117 | 34 | 141 | 40 | — | |
| Alan Harding | MF | 1970–1973 | 129 | 37 | 140 | 38 | — | |
| Allan Gauden | MF | 1968–1972 | 127 | 39 | 140 | 43 | — | |
| Jimmy Seal | FW | 1976–1979 | 122 | 19 | 140 | 22 | — | |
| Billy Coulthard | FB | 1934–1937 | 119 | 0 | 137 | 0 | — | |
| Steve Mardenborough | MF | 1990–1993 | 123 | 19 | 136 | 21 | — | |
| Robbie Painter | FW / MF | 1993–1996 | 115 | 28 | 136 | 34 | — | |
| George McGeachie | MF | 1964–1966 | 119 | 9 | 135 | 10 | — | |
| Alan Roberts | MF | 1985–1988 | 119 | 19 | 135 | 19 | — | |
| Paul Heckingbottom | DF | 1999–2002 | 115 | 5 | 135 | 6 | — | |
| Will Hatfield * | MF | 2019–2022; 2023–present | 113 | 14 | 135 | 18 | — | |
| Billy Eden | FW | 1928–1929; 1932–1935 | 119 | 31 | 134 | 36 | — | |
| Ian Clark | MF | 2001–2005 | 119 | 26 | 134 | 27 | — | |
| Peter Graham | MF | 1970–1973 | 119 | 44 | 131 | 45 | — | |
| Steve Holbrook | MF | 1972–1977 | 116 | 12 | 131 | 13 | English schools | |
| Joe Wheatley | MF | 2017–2022 | 112 | 2 | 131 | 3 | England C | |
| Peter Robinson | DF | 1985–1988 | 112 | 5 | 130 | 7 | England semi-pro | |
| Neil Maddison | MF | 2001–2006 | 115 | 4 | 129 | 4 | — | |
| John Stalker | FW | 1979–1982 | 116 | 36 | 128 | 38 | — | |
| Tom Halliday | FB / HB | 1929–1933 | 118 | 2 | 127 | 3 | English schools | |
| Ron Ferguson | FW | 1976–1980 | 114 | 18 | 127 | 22 | — | |
| David Cork | FW | 1989–1992 | 105 | 23 | 127 | 31 | — | |
| Tommy Taylor | GK | 2021–2024 | 116 | 0 | 126 | 0 | — | |
| Tommy Ward | FW | 1948–1953 | 119 | 32 | 125 | 34 | — | |
| Phil Owers | GK | 1973–1975; 1976–1980 | 114 | 0 | 125 | 0 | — | |
| Norman Lees | DF | 1971–1976 | 120 | 5 | 124 | 5 | — | |
| Mark Hooper | FW | 1924–1927 | 116 | 43 | 124 | 43 | — | |
| Jackie Maltby | FW | 1961–1965 | 114 | 32 | 124 | 36 | — | |
| Jerry Best | FW | 1933–1936 | 109 | 67 | 124 | 80 | — | |
| Ernie Devlin | FB | 1954–1957 | 115 | 1 | 122 | 1 | — | |
| Eddie Rowles | FW | 1975–1977 | 103 | 21 | 122 | 25 | — | |
| Don Burluraux | MF | 1972–1975 | 112 | 13 | 120 | 13 | — | |
| Pat Cuff | GK | 1980–1983 | 110 | 0 | 120 | 0 | English schools | |
| John Towers | FW / HB | 1935–1946 | 107 | 22 | 120 | 27 | — | |
| Kevin Todd | FW | 1983–1985 | 102 | 23 | 120 | 26 | — | |
| Bobby Baxter | FW / FB | 1959–1961; 1969–1970 | 106 | 31 | 119 | 33 | — | |
| Ray Yeoman | MF | 1964–1967 | 104 | 2 | 118 | 2 | — | |
| Alan White | DF | 2007–2009; 2010; 2013–2015 | 99 | 4 | 118 | 8 | — | (Note: Luton Town) |
| Richard Hodgson | MF | 2000–2003 | 98 | 6 | 117 | 10 | — | |
| George Mulholland | DF | 1960–1963 | 106 | 0 | 116 | 0 | — | |
| Lee Ellison | FW | 1990–1994; 1998–1999 | 100 | 20 | 115 | 23 | — | |
| Cliff Mason | FB | 1952–1955 | 107 | 0 | 114 | 0 | — | |
| Barry Lyons | MF | 1976–1979 | 97 | 10 | 114 | 12 | — | |
| Andy Greig | GK | 1919–1924 | 95 | 0 | 114 | 0 | — | |
| Gordon Cattrell | MF | 1973–1976 | 102 | 5 | 112 | 6 | English schools | |
| Martin Burleigh | GK | 1974–1975; 1977–1979 | 101 | 0 | 112 | 0 | — | |
| Darren Roberts | FW | 1996–1999 | 96 | 33 | 112 | 38 | — | |
| Ian Hamilton | MF | 1979–1982 | 103 | 19 | 110 | 19 | — | |
| Bobby Simpson | FW | 1936–1947 | 96 | 14 | 110 | 15 | — | |
| Maurice Wellock | FW | 1929–1932 | 104 | 71 | 109 | 74 | English schools | |
| Jimmy McKinnell | HB | 1926–1929 | 101 | 1 | 109 | 1 | — | |
| Sandy Cochrane | FW | 1926–1929 | 100 | 24 | 109 | 25 | — | |
| Mark Convery | MF | 2001–2005; 2009–2010 | 97 | 3 | 109 | 4 | — | |
| Peter Johnson | DF | 1983–1985 | 89 | 2 | 108 | 2 | — | |
| Davie Brown | FW | 1923–1926 | 97 | 74 | 107 | 77 | — | |
| Steve Foster | DF | 2007–2010 | 92 | 2 | 107 | 3 | — | |
| Ray Spencer | HB | 1958–1961 | 97 | 5 | 106 | 7 | English schools | |
| Andy Mitchell | FW | 1929–1932 | 99 | 32 | 105 | 33 | — | |
| Dickie Davis | FW | 1954–1957 | 93 | 32 | 105 | 35 | English schools | |
| David Preece | GK | 1997–1999 | 91 | 0 | 104 | 0 | — | |
| Liam Hatch | FW | 2008–2009; 2010–2012; 2014 | 85 | 22 | 104 | 29 | England semi-pro | (Note: Peterborough United) |
| Dave Hawker | MF | 1980–1982; 1984 | 95 | 2 | 103 | 3 | — | |
| Frank Gray | DF | 1989–1992 | 85 | 8 | 103 | 9 | Scotland | |
| Jake Lawlor | DF | 2021–2024 | 97 | 6 | 102 | 6 | — | (Note: Hartlepool United) (Note: For the visit to AFC Telford United on 1 November 2022, Soccerway lists the originally declared lineup, which included Lawlor; however, he was injured in the warm-up and replaced in the starting eleven by Kaine Felix, so Lawlor should have one league appearance fewer than listed by Soccerway.) |
| Paul Arnison | DF | 2009–2012 | 89 | 3 | 101 | 4 | — | |
| Paul Emson | MF | 1988–1991 | 82 | 12 | 100 | 12 | — | |

== Notes ==
Player statistics include games played while on loan from:

== Sources ==
- Joyce, Michael (2004). Football League Players' Records 1888 to 1939. Nottingham: SoccerData. ISBN 978-1-899468-67-6.
- Tweddle, Frank (2000). The Definitive Darlington F.C. Nottingham: SoccerData. ISBN 978-1-899468-15-7.
