= Robert Simpson =

Robert, Bob or Bobby Simpson may refer to:

== Entertainment ==
- Robert Simpson (writer) (1886–1934), writer and editor
- Robert Simpson (film editor) (1910–1977), American film editor
- Robert Simpson (composer) (1921–1997), English composer
- Birth name of Rufus Hound (born 1979), comedian, actor and presenter
- Bobby Simpson (Home and Away), soap opera character
- Robert Simpson Jr., former professional name of actor Robert Fuller

== Politics ==
- Robert Kirkpatrick Simpson (1837–1921), member of the New Zealand Legislative Council
- Robert A. Simpson (1910–1998), Alberta politician in Calgary North Hill
- Robert Simpson (Manitoba politician) (1910–1997), member of the Canadian House of Commons
- Robert B. Simpson (born 1943), director of New Brunswick Healthcare Association and New Brunswick politician
- Bob Simpson (British Columbia politician) (born 1956/7), member of Legislative Assembly of British Columbia
- Robert Simpson (Northern Ireland politician) (1923–1997), Northern Irish politician
- Robert Simpson (brewer), mayor of Barrie, Ontario, 1871–72 and 1876

== Sports ==
- Robert Simpson (golfer) (1862–1923), Scottish golfer
- Bobby Simpson (golfer), Scottish golfer who played as a pro in the United States in the early 1900s
- Robert Simpson (hurdler) (1892–1974), American track and field athlete and coach
- Bob Simpson (Canadian football) (1930–2007), Canadian football player
- Bob Simpson (cricketer) (1936–2025), Australian cricketer
- Bobby Simpson (footballer, born 1888) (1888– after 1913), English footballer
- Bobby Simpson (footballer, born 1915) (1915–1994), English footballer
- Bobby Simpson (ice hockey) (born 1956), former NHL ice hockey player
- Robert Simpson (cricketer) (born 1962), English cricketer
- Bob R. Simpson, American business executive, Major League Baseball Texas Rangers co-owner
- Robert Simpson (rugby union), Scotland international rugby union player

== Other ==
- Roberto Simpson Winthrop (1799–1877), born Robert Simpson, rear-admiral of the Chilean Navy
- Robert Simpson (merchant) (1834–1897), Canadian businessman
- Robert Simpson (meteorologist) (1912–2014), American meteorologist
- Robert L. Simpson (Mormon) (1915–2003), American authority of The Church of Jesus Christ of Latter-day Saints
- Bob Simpson (journalist) (1944–2006), foreign correspondent for the BBC
- Robert L. Simpson Jr., artificial intelligence scientist

== See also ==
- Robert Simson (1687–1768), Scottish mathematician
- Robert Simpson-Anderson (born 1942), Chief of the South African Navy
- Simpson (name)
