= Keith Morton =

English footballer (1934–2021)

Personal information
- Full name: Keith Morton
- Date of birth: 11 August 1934
- Place of birth: Consett, County Durham, England
- Date of death: 24 November 2021 (aged 87)
- Positions: Forward; winger

Senior career*
Years	Team	Apps	(Gls)
1953–1954	Crystal Palace	5	(3)
1954–1955	Sunderland	0	(0)
1955–1961	Darlington	171	(49)
Total		176	(52)
- * Club domestic league appearances and goals

Keith Morton (11 August 1934 – 24 November 2021) was an English professional footballer who scored 52 goals from 176 appearances in the Football League for Crystal Palace and Darlington in the 1950s and early 1960s. He played for Palace as an amateur, and was on the books of Sunderland before spending the majority of his career with Darlington. He began his career as a centre forward and finished as an outside right.

== Life and career ==
Morton was born in Consett, County Durham. He began his football career as a teenage amateur with Crystal Palace, and scored three goals from five Third Division South appearances in the 1953–54 Football League season. He returned to the north-east of England and spent a season with First Division club Sunderland, but never appeared for their first team. In May 1955, he signed for Third Division North club Darlington, where he soon established himself as a first-team regular.

In the fourth round of the 1957–58 FA Cup, Ron Harbertson, Dave Carr and Morton scored at Stamford Bridge to give Darlington a three-goal lead over Chelsea, league champions only three years earlier, but they let the lead slip. Unfit for the replay because of injury, Morton's place went to Tommy Moran, who scored twice and created two more to inflict an embarrassing defeat on the First Division side.

In a match against local rivals Hartlepools United at Christmas 1958, he was knocked unconscious and broke bones in his neck when opposing full-back Jack Cameron fell on him after a tackle. He underwent emergency surgery and was in an upper-body cast for four months. Although able to resume his career the next season, he retired in 1961 aged just 26, having made two hundred senior appearances in all competitions, of which all but five were for Darlington. In March of that year, he shared a benefit match with Darlington's appearance-record holder Ron Greener.

After retirement, Morton sold second-hand cars in his native Consett. He died on 24 November 2021, at the age of 87. His funeral service at Delves Lane Chapel was followed by cremation at Durham City Crematorium on 9 December 2021.

== Career statistics ==
Appearances and goals by club, season and competition
Club	Season	League			FA Cup		League Cup		Total	
Club	Season	Division	Apps	Goals	Apps	Goals	Apps	Goals	Apps	Goals
Crystal Palace	1953–54	Third Division South	5	3	0	0	—		5	3
Sunderland	1954–55	First Division	0	0	0	0	—		0	0
Darlington	1955–56	Third Division North	43	14	3	0	—		46	14
Darlington	1956–57	Third Division North	25	14	2	3	—		27	17
Darlington	1957–58	Third Division North	36	6	4	1	—		40	7
Darlington	1958–59	Fourth Division	21	4	3	1	—		24	5
Darlington	1959–60	Fourth Division	20	2	2	1	—		22	3
Darlington	1960–61	Fourth Division	27	9	6	0	3	0	36	9
Darlington	Total		172	49	20	6	3	0	195	55
Career total			177	52	20	6	3	0	200	58
