= Edward Hanlon =

Edward, Eddie, or Ned Hanlon may refer to:

- Edward Hanlon Jr. (born 1944), American lieutenant general
- Eddie Hanlon (1886–1925), English footballer
- Ned Hanlon (baseball) (1857–1937), baseball player and manager
- Ned Hanlon (politician) (1887–1952), former Premier of Queensland

== See also ==
- Ned Hanlan, rower
