= Brian Henderson (English footballer) =

English footballer

Personal information
- Full name: Brian Charles Henderson
- Date of birth: 12 June 1930
- Place of birth: Hexham, Northumberland, England
- Date of death: 7 November 2001 (aged 71)
- Place of death: Darlington, County Durham, England
- Position: Full back

Youth career
- –: Newcastle United

Senior career*
Years	Team	Apps	(Gls)
1950–1952	Carlisle United	0	(0)
1952–1964	Darlington	423	(3)
- * Club domestic league appearances and goals

Brian Charles Henderson (12 June 1930 – 7 November 2001) was an English footballer who made 423 appearances in the Football League playing as a full back for Darlington in the 1950s and 1960s. He was previously on the books of Newcastle United and Carlisle United, but played for neither in the League.

== Life and career ==
Henderson was born in Hexham, Northumberland, later moving to nearby Allendale. As a young boy, he was unable to walk for a year because of a paralytic illness. He began his football career as a junior with Newcastle United before signing for Carlisle United in 1950. He played for Carlisle's reserves in the North-Eastern League, but never played first-team football for them, and signed for Third Division North club Darlington in 1952.

He made his senior debut for Darlington on 17 September 1952, against Carlisle United, but after Ernie Devlin arrived from West Ham United in 1953 and was named captain, he played less frequently than in his first season. When Cliff Mason's departure for Sheffield United in 1955 left a vacancy at full-back, Henderson became a permanent fixture in the position.

He was a member of the Darlington team that caused an upset in the 1957–58 FA Cup by eliminating Chelsea, who had won the league title only three seasons before, to reach the last 16 of the competition. He injured his neck in the first match, in which Chelsea came back from 3–0 down at Stamford Bridge to draw 3–3, but had recovered in time for the replay four days later at Darlington's Feethams ground. The score after 90 minutes was 1–1. In the first nine minutes of extra time, Darlington scored three times to take the match 4–1. He helped Darlington eliminate Crystal Palace and West Ham in the first two rounds of the 1960–61 League Cup before facing Bolton Wanderers, whose team contained five international players, in the third. Darlington took the lead, with a 25-yard (23 m) shot from Joe Rayment, Bolton equalised in the second half against the run of play with a free kick from distance, and Henderson cleared off the line from both Nat Lofthouse and Doug Holden before the latter finally scored a winner seconds from time. The attendance, of 21,023, remains a club record.

He captained the club, and earned a reputation as a hard man. According to the club's historian, "he seemed to have no fear, a crash, bang wallop defender who'd win the ball and set attacks away", and he was reported to have played for six weeks with cotton wool in his boots to ease the pain from a broken ankle. On 4 January 1964, Henderson's right leg was broken in two places during a match against Stockport County. He had to be carried off the field on a canvas toolbag because his partner at full-back, Bobby Whitehead, was already occupying the only stretcher having also suffered a broken leg. Neither man played professionally again. A Darlington XI played a strong Sunderland side in a testimonial match for Henderson at the end of the season. Henderson made 463 senior appearances for Darlington over twelve-and-a-half seasons – 423 in the Football League, 32 in the FA Cup and 8 in the League Cup – which at the time placed him top of the club's all-time appearance list, since overtaken by Ron Greener and John Peverell.

While a Darlington player, Henderson had worked in sales for the club chairman's car company. In later life he made occasional appearances in local football. He settled in Darlington, and died there in 2001 at the age of 71. He had a son, Tim, and grandchildren.
