= Owers =

Owers is a surname. Notable people with the surname include:

- Adrian Owers (born 1965), English footballer
- Anne Owers (born 1947), British prison inspector
- Gary Owers (born 1968), English footballer
- Ginger Owers (1888–1951), English footballer
- Ken Owers (born 1953), English snooker player
- Lloyd Owers (born 1989), English football manager
- Phil Owers (born 1955), English footballer
