= Ian Dickson =

Ian Dickson may refer to:

- Ian Dickson (footballer) (1902–1976), Scottish footballer
- Ian Dickson (TV personality) (born 1963), Australian TV and radio personality and former music mogul
