= David Moir =

David Moir may refer to:

- David Moir (bishop) (died 1847), Scottish Episcopal bishop
- David Macbeth Moir (1798–1851), Scottish physician and writer
- David Moir (footballer) (1897–1969), English footballer
- David Moore (1808-1879), Scottish botanist born David Moir

== See also ==
- Moir (surname)
- Moir (disambiguation)
