= Tommy Winship =

English footballer

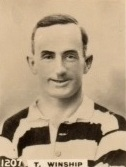
- Winship in Darlington colours

Personal information
- Full name: Thomas Winship
- Date of birth: 14 July 1890
- Place of birth: Byker, England
- Date of death: 1976 (aged 86)
- Place of death: Newcastle upon Tyne, England
- Height: 5 ft 3 1/2 in (1.61 m)
- Position: Outside left

Senior career*
Years	Team	Apps	(Gls)
- Sleekburn Villa
19??–1910	Wallsend Park Villa		
1910–1913	Woolwich Arsenal	28	(3)
1913	Fulham	2	(0)
1913–1915	Woolwich Arsenal / Arsenal (Note: The club was renamed from Woolwich Arsenal to Arsenal in 1914.)	27	(4)
1919	Hartlepools United (Note: Appearances and goals in the Northern Victory League)	8	(2)
1919–1926	Darlington (Note: Because appearance statistics for the North-Eastern League are not readily available – Frank Tweddle's Definitive Darlington F.C. lists goalscorers but not lineups for matches in this competition – these figures include only Football League appearances and goals.)	146	(17)
1926–1927	Crewe Alexandra	21	(1)
1927–192?	Wallsend		
- Trimdon Grange
- Cockfield
- Spen Black and White
19??–1930	Marley Hill UCG		
- * Club domestic league appearances and goals

Thomas Winship (14 July 1890 – 1976), generally known as Tom or Tommy Winship, but also referred to as Wee Winship because of his small stature, was an English footballer who played as an outside left. He scored 25 goals from 224 appearances in the Football League playing for Woolwich Arsenal and Fulham before the First World War and for Darlington and Crewe Alexandra after it.

Winship began his football career with junior clubs in the area local to his native Newcastle upon Tyne. He played in the North-Eastern League for Wallsend Park Villa before joining Football League First Division club Woolwich Arsenal in late 1910. He made nearly 30 first-team appearances in a little over two years, then spent the last few weeks of the 1912–13 season with Fulham before returning to Arsenal, by then a Second Division team. In the two seasons before the Football League was suspended for the duration of the First World War, he took his appearance total to 56 matches, and then returned to the north-east where he worked in shipbuilding before serving in the Royal Engineers.

After the war, he played for Hartlepools United in the Northern Victory League, then helped Darlington reach runners-up spot in the 1919–20 North-Eastern League and win the title the following year. Darlington were elected to the newly formed Northern Section of the Third Division in 1921, and Winship contributed to their second-place finish in their first season and their Northern Section title in 1924–25. Before Winship could represent Darlington in Second Division football, they had to pay £100 to Arsenal to transfer his registration, which that club had retained. He was not a regular at the higher level, but still took his total of league appearances for Darlington to nearly 150 over five seasons. He then spent one last season in the Football League with Third Division Crewe Alexandra before returning to his native north-east of England where he played at non-League level for a further three years.

== Early life and career ==
Winship was born in the Byker area of Newcastle upon Tyne, which was then part of Northumberland, the third child of John Winship, a brickmaker, and his wife Mary. He began his football career in the local area, playing for Sleekburn Villa before joining North-Eastern League club Wallsend Park Villa, and it was from the latter club that he signed for Woolwich Arsenal of the Football League First Division in late 1910. He was reported in the London press as "considered one of the best junior players in the North".

The Woolwich Gazette's correspondent was not overly encouraged by his performance in a reserve-team match against Luton Town's reserves on Arsenal's Manor Ground, assessing him as "a smart little player, who, I fancy, will not be smart enough for the Seniors." The writer was concerned less by his lack of height – at just 5 ft 3 1/2 in (1.61 m), he was nicknamed "Wee Winship" – than by the effect that his build might have on a perceived lack of pace: "I do not think he is fast enough, and he may be a bit too stocky to become appreciably faster." He did give him credit for "one advantage over others who have filled the outside-left position – he can centre, and seldom wastes one, and this is a great thing nowadays."

== Woolwich Arsenal ==
Winship made his first-team debut on Boxing Day 1910 against Football League leaders Manchester United at Old Trafford. Arsenal lost 5–0, and the Daily News' reporter thought their forwards' shooting was the worst he had seen all season and "the only member of the line who was not greatly at fault was Winship, a small youth who was playing as outside left and delighted the crowd by sprightliness and accurate centring from all positions." A fortnight later, the Sheffield Daily Telegraph described Arsenal as having "a couple of capable, enterprising wingers, though Winship was a bit late waking up" in a 3–2 defeat to Sheffield United. He had a run of seven league matches, counting the visit of Aston Villa abandoned because of bad light, before Charles Lewis took over at outside left and David Greenaway returned to the side on the right wing.

Arsenal faced Tottenham Hotspur in the traditional home-and-away Christmas fixtures in 1911. Winship came into the team for the visit to White Hart Lane, a heavy defeat, before returning to the Manor Ground to play a major role in the 3–1 win against their London rivals. Described by the Daily Mirror as having the ideal build for work in the muddy conditions, Winship crossed the ball to set up Lewis's close-range opening goal. Arsenal's second came from the free kick awarded for a foul on Winship, and he scored "an exceptionally clever" third himself. It was his first competitive goal for Arsenal, and his second came a few days later in a 2–2 draw with Aston Villa. In mid-March, he was carried off the field with what the Daily Express called a nasty leg injury in a match against West Bromwich Albion and played no further part in the first team that season. Winship married in Newcastle later that year. His wife, Rose Kilpatrick, was one of two domestic servants of a restaurant proprietor in Byker.

In the 1912–13 season, he played 14 league matches, scoring once, before signing for Fulham in mid-March. Arsenal were relegated to the Second Division at the end of that season, and promptly re-signed Winship, who had played just twice for Fulham. Questions were asked as to the probity of the transfer – Sir Henry Norris had been and remained a director of Fulham before becoming major shareholder in and chairman of Arsenal – but the Football League's management committee ratified his return. Woolwich Arsenal began the 1913–14 season in their new stadium with the visit of Leicester City on 6 September. The visitors took a one-goal lead, and George Jobey scored the equaliser – Arsenal's first goal at what would become generally known as Highbury – with a header from Winship's corner; Arsenal went on to win the match 2–1 with a second-half penalty.

Later that season, the club dropped the "Woolwich" from its name and began to call itself The Arsenal. Winship scored the first goal for the club under that new name to equalise against Bristol City: Jobey sent a free kick across goal "and Winship, running in, crashed the ball into the net with a magnificent first-time drive". He also scored what would have been a winning goal, had the officials not disallowed it; the game was temporarily halted while the police dealt with displeasure among the home support. Winship never established himself as a first-team regular; his Arsenal career ended when the Football League was suspended for the duration of the First World War, at which point he had played 56 first-team matches.

== First World War ==
Winship returned to Tyneside to work in shipbuilding, but kept up his footballing skills when he could. In October 1915, together with a number of other former professional players, he took part in a benefit match for the family of a local footballer killed on active service. The following year he guested for Ashington in Easter fixtures against Blyth Spartans, and was expected to appear for Leeds City at Grimsby Town in the Midland Section of the wartime league competition, but did not. By November 1917, listed as Sapper Winship, he was guesting for Grimsby for their visit to Leicester Fosse, and in September 1918, he was a member of the Royal Engineers Reserve Battalion team that won a five-a-side tournament in aid of the Football National War Fund. He had also found time to serve his country in France. In December 1918, after the war ended but before his demobilisation, Lance-Corporal Winship played for the 1st Royal Engineers stationed at Newark, Nottinghamshire, against a Derby-based eleven featuring the former England international Steve Bloomer, who was making his first footballing appearance since his return from a German prisoner-of-war camp.

By February 1919, Winship was back in the north-east and playing for Hartlepools United in the Northern Victory League. He appeared in eight of the fourteen matches and scored twice. When league football resumed in the 1919–20 season, he did not return to Arsenal, but became one of a number of former Football League players to sign for the re-formed Darlington club, playing in the North-Eastern League.

== Darlington ==
=== North-Eastern League ===
Darlington began the 1919–20 North-Eastern League season well. By mid-October, when Winship contributed two goals to a 5–3 defeat of Sunderland Reserves – he was to finish the campaign with thirteen – Darlington were top of the table, but they were unable to hold on to their lead, and finished as runners-up, two points behind Middlesbrough Reserves. He helped Darlington reach the second round proper (last 32) of the 1919–20 FA Cup, with a goal in the 5–0 elimination of Southern League club Norwich City in the sixth qualifying round, was "ever dangerous" in the goalless draw at home to The Wednesday of the First Division in the first round, and took the corner from which George Stevens opened the scoring in the replay. Darlington faced Second Division Birmingham in the second round without centre forward Dick Healey, and according to the Yorkshire Post's reporter, in his absence "there were long spells in the game when Winship, who is very clever when he gets an opening, was left without the slightest chance of gaining distinction." Winship missed a penalty, Birmingham won 4–0, and "it must have been exasperating to the supporters of Darlington to see Winship having such an idle time on the far wing." The Northern Echo suggested that the reason Winship was not himself was "a staggering blow in the face from the Birmingham right half's elbow" received early on in the match.

Winship was a key player in 1920–21. He scored eleven goals, which included the only goal of the away match against Hartlepools United and a penalty in the 3–2 win away to Middlesbrough Reserves, as Darlington finished one point ahead of the latter to win the title. They were one of four North-Eastern League teams to be elected to the newly formed Northern Section of the Third Division for the 1921–22 Football League season.

=== Football League ===
Within the first minute of Darlington's first Football League match, at home to Halifax Town on 27 August 1921, Winship made a run down the left wing and crossed towards Bill Hooper, whose "driving shot" was "in all probability" the first goal scored in the new division. According to the Northern Echo, Winship was the best player on the field: "time and again he got away down the wing and sent across some lovely centres". He provided numerous assists over the season, including one cross that confused Wrexham defenders into giving away an own goal, and scored goals as well, including two in a 7–3 defeat of Durham City, as Darlington finished in second place.

Although Darlington performed rather less well in 1922–23 season, Winship remained in the thick of the action. Against Rochdale, he scored his side's only goal, struck the crossbar from distance, and was fouled for a penalty, but George Malcolm's kick was saved. The following week, he was again fouled for a penalty, and this time Hughie Dickson's kick produced the only goal of the game. In March 1923, after he scored twice against Bradford, the Derby Daily Telegraph described him as "quite the most consistent forward in Darlington's weak attack" whom "no inducement has yet proved sufficient" to persuade to leave. Arsenal had retained his registration, and listed him for transfer at a fee of £300, a not inconsiderable sum for a man of nearly 33.

At the end of the next season, Winship was awarded a benefit match, in recognition of his five years' service as "one of the most popular players ever connected with the Skerneside club"; he could not play in the match, against a Middlesbrough eleven, because of injury.

He began the 1924–25 season in the reserves, Walter Creasor being preferred at outside left, but soon returned to first-team duties. In their first defeat of the season, away to Rochdale in mid-September, the Athletic News reported that "Winship was the pick of the Darlington forwards, and several of his early centres should have been turned to good account", and two weeks later he produced a "swinging shot which curled into the net" to open the scoring at home to Bradford. Darlington soon established a lead at the top of the division which they were to hold for the rest of the season, despite their team containing numerous "real old stagers", players who were well known before the war. Winship himself was still "nippy", despite his veteran status, though not as quick as the outside-right Mark Hooper.

If Darlington wanted to retain Winship's services for their Second Division campaign, Arsenal required payment to release his registration; a fee of £100 was agreed, and he became Darlington's player. Likewise, they had to pay £150 to Bury for the transfer of full-back Tommy Greaves, who had been with the club a similar length of time. By October, the team were struggling at the higher level, and Winship and other of the older men were dropped in favour of "younger and speedier players". Darlington retained their Second Division status, and Winship brought his career statistics to 17 goals from 146 Football League matches with the club.

== Later life and career ==
Winship, Davie Brown and George Stevens were among the players not offered terms by Darlington for the 1926–27 season. They were given free transfers, and all three returned to the Third Division North with Crewe Alexandra. Winship scored what was to prove his only goal for Crewe in a 3–3 draw with Lincoln City in September, but after the game conceded "without hesitation" that the goal should have been disallowed because a teammate was clearly in an offside position. The Derby Daily Telegraph wrote in December that he had been one of Crewe's most consistent players of the season thus far, that his experience counted for much, and despite his advancing years, he was still capable of being a "very powerful and dangerous raider". A few days later, he twisted his knee in a match against his former employers Hartlepools United and was out for four months. Appearances in the last three fixtures of the season took his total to 23 in senior competitions for Crewe, and put an end to a Football League career in which he scored 25 goals from 224 matches.

Winship returned to his native north-east of England where he set up in business. In December, he returned to the North-Eastern League with his former club Wallsend (renamed from Wallsend Park Villa). He went on to play for Trimdon Grange, Cockfield, Spen Black and White and Marley Hill UCG before retiring at the age of 40. The 1939 Register finds him living with his wife and three adult sons in Second Avenue in the Heaton district of Newcastle and working as a house painter.

Winship died in Newcastle in late 1976 at the age of 86.

== Career statistics ==
Appearances and goals by club, season and competition
Club	Season	League			FA Cup		Total	
Club	Season	Division	Apps	Goals	Apps	Goals	Apps	Goals
Woolwich Arsenal	1910–11	First Division	6	0	0	0	6	0
Woolwich Arsenal	1911–12	First Division	8	2	1	0	9	2
Woolwich Arsenal	1912–13	First Division	14	1	0	0	14	1
Woolwich Arsenal	Total		28	3	1	0	29	3
Fulham	1912–13	Second Division	2	0	—		0	0
Woolwich Arsenal	1913–14	Second Division	15	2	0	0	15	0
Arsenal	1914–15	Second Division	12	2	0	0	12	2
Arsenal	Total		27	4	0	0	27	4
Hartlepools United	1919	Northern Victory League	8	2	—		8	2
Darlington	1919–20	North-Eastern League		13	6	2	6	15
Darlington	1920–21	North-Eastern League		11	3	0	3	11
Darlington	1921–22	Third Division North	34	4	4	0	38	4
Darlington	1922–23	Third Division North	35	3	2	0	37	3
Darlington	1923–24	Third Division North	36	7	4	0	40	7
Darlington	1924–25	Third Division North	34	2	5	1	39	3
Darlington	1925–26	Second Division	7	1	1	0	8	1
Darlington	Total		146	41	25	3	171	44
Crewe Alexandra	1926–27	Third Division North	21	1	2	0	23	1
Career total			232	51	28	3	260	54

== Honours ==
Darlington

- North-Eastern League winners: 1920–21; runners-up: 1919–20
- Football League Third Division North winners: 1924–25; runners-up: 1921–22
