= Cornock =

Cornock is a surname. Notable people with the surname include:

- Don Cornock (1930–1969), Scottish footballer
- Matthew Cornock (1890–1961), Scottish footballer
- Walter Cornock (1921–2007), Australian football goalkeeper and first-class cricketer

== See also ==
- Cornick
