= Hughie Dickson =

English footballer

Personal information
- Full name: Hugh Paris Dickson
- Date of birth: 14 July 1895
- Place of birth: Worksop, Nottinghamshire, England
- Date of death: 15 July 1965
- Place of death: Northallerton, North Yorkshire, England
- Height: 5 ft 8 in (1.73 m)
- Positions: Right half; inside forward

Senior career*
Years	Team	Apps	(Gls)
- Gainsborough Trinity
- Worksop Town
1919–1934	Darlington	402	(37)
- Newburn
- * Club domestic league appearances and goals

Hugh Paris Dickson (14 July 1895 – 15 July 1965), generally known as Hughie Dickson, was an English footballer who scored 37 goals from 402 appearances in the Football League playing for Darlington. He also played non-league football for Gainsborough Trinity, Worksop Town and Newburn. His primary position was right half, but he also played at inside forward and, towards the end of his career, at right back.

== Life and career ==
Dickson was born in Worksop, Nottinghamshire, in 1895. He played for Gainsborough Trinity and for Worksop Town before joining Darlington when the club re-formed after the First World War. By January 1920, Dickson was part of a Darlington half-back line – the others being George Malcolm and Percy Sutcliffe – who, according to the Daily Express ahead of their FA Cup tie with Second Division Birmingham, had acquired "a reputation for upsetting opponents' designs". In the event, they could not upset Birmingham's designs: Tommy Winship missed a penalty, and Darlington lost 4–0. Dickson and right-back Arthur Golightly were their most "conspicuous" players, though both "perceptibly tired under pressure" towards the end of the game. In February, he was one of two Darlington players selected for the North Eastern League representative team to face the Central League. He helped Darlington win the North Eastern League title in 1920–21, after which the club was elected to the Football League's newly formed Third Division Northern Section.

Dickson played in Darlington's first Football League match, at home to Halifax Town on 27 August 1921. He scored the second goal in a 2–0 win, an 84th-minute penalty kick awarded for handball. According to the Derby Daily Telegraph, although "non too big, he has a terrier-like way of tackling, and the Halifax left wing found him a difficult man to get by".

From time to time during the 1922–23 season, he played at inside forward with Bert Burridge at right half, and after goals in each of his first two matches of the 1923–24 season, the Derby Daily Telegraph wrote that "he has been instrumental in putting a lot of 'pep' into the attack", and that although "neither big nor heavy, ... he is the type of player who takes a lot of shifting off the ball. He can shoot, too." By midway through the season, his form was such that "substantial offers" had reportedly been made by First Division clubs for his services, but Darlington did not sell.

In September 1924, a crowd of 5,000 saw Scottish club Raith Rovers, with former Darlington player Peter Bell in their team, visit Feethams for Dickson's benefit match. That season, Darlington won the Northern Section title, thus gaining promotion to the Second Division. They struggled initially at the higher level; but by the turn of the year, Dickson and his fellow half-backs, Billy Robinson in the centre and Burridge on the left, were described as "sound", and having "splendidly served" their teammates.

For 1926–27, Darlington replaced Burridge with Jimmy McKinnell from Blackburn Rovers, and manager Jack English suggested the side would be "largely experimental", a blend of young players and more experienced men. At Fulham early in the season, Dickson reportedly found home forward Frank Penn "so clever that [he] seemed to give him up as a job too bad to be undertaken", but later that month, he was the pick of Darlington's side and scored twice in a 4–2 defeat of Reading. He was injured in the fourth-round defeat to First Division Cardiff City in that season's FA Cup, initially moving out to the wing before having to leave the field entirely for half an hour. Darlington were relegated back to the Northern Section on the final day of the season.

Dickson regularly took the club's penalties, and his follow-up from a saved penalty gave Darlington a 2–1 win against Scarborough in a 1928–29 FA Cup second-round replay. A couple of weeks later, Darlington took a two-goal lead at home to Bradford City, but the league leaders scored twice after Dickson had to leave the field because of an injury that was to keep him out for several weeks, so he missed the 6–2 third-round Cup loss to Bury. He had not long returned to the side when he suffered a head wound while working at Whessoe Foundry. He was taken to hospital where the wound was stitched, and missed only one match while recovering.

He received a second benefit in April 1930, the proceeds of a match against Middlesbrough's first team, by which time he had made approaching 500 appearances for Darlington in all competitions. In the later part of his career, Dickson was used in the right-back position, partnering Herbert Brown. In March 1932, "the club's most popular and consistent player", according to the Yorkshire Post, announced his retirement at the end of the season after 13 years and nearly 600 games. The 3–2 home defeat to Doncaster Rovers on 30 April should have been his last game before entering a career in business, but he was lured out of retirement for a few appearances during the 1933–34 season. On what was his final appearance for the club, on 10 February 1934, he scored Darlington's consolation in a 6–1 defeat at Wrexham. He had played 433 matches in Football League and FA Cup.

== Honours ==
Darlington

- North Eastern League: 1920–21
- Football League Second Division; 1924–25
