= William Ingham =

English footballer active 1902 - 1915

Personal information
- Full name: William Harold Ingham
- Date of birth: 1882
- Position: Centre forward

Senior career*
Years	Team	Apps	(Gls)
–	Aberdare Athletic		
1903–1904	West Ham United	2	(0)
1904–1905	Aberdare Athletic		
1905–1906	Bristol City	1	(0)
1906–1907	Gainsborough Trinity	28	(7)
1907–1909	Plymouth Argyle	78	(19)
1909–1910	Accrington Stanley		
1910–1914	Norwich City	131	(32)
1914–191?	Darlington		
- * Club domestic league appearances and goals

William Harold Ingham (1882 – after 1915) was a footballer who played in the Football League for Bristol City and Gainsborough Trinity, and the Southern League for West Ham United, Plymouth Argyle and Norwich City. He was a centre forward.

== Life and career ==
Ingham began his career with Aberdare Athletic before joining West Ham United in 1903. He made two league appearances in one season with the club and then returned to Aberdare. In April 1905, Ingham played for Aberdare in the Welsh Cup final against Wrexham. He was signed by Bristol City later that year, where he played in one league game. In 1906, he joined Gainsborough Trinity and scored seven goals in 28 league appearances for the club. Having moved to Plymouth Argyle the following year, Ingham was the club's top goalscorer in his first season. He made 80 appearances for Argyle in all competitions and scored 20 goals before joining Accrington Stanley in 1909.

He went on to play for Norwich City and was twice selected to play for the Southern League representative side. Together with Norwich team-mate Percy Sutcliffe, Ingham signed professional forms with North-Eastern League club Darlington in 1914. He scored 18 goals in league competition in the 1914–15 season and scored once from five appearances in the FA Cup. Competitive football was suspended in 1915 due to the First World War and there is no record of Ingham resuming his career after the conflict.
