= Bobby Whitehead =

English footballer (1936–2019)

Personal information
- Full name: Robert Whitehead
- Date of birth: 22 September 1936
- Place of birth: Ashington, Northumberland, England
- Date of death: 6 March 2019 (aged 82)
- Position: Right back

Senior career*
Years	Team	Apps	(Gls)
- Fatfield Athletic
1954–1960	Newcastle United	20	(0)
1960–1962	→ Cambridge City		
1962–1964	Darlington	53	(0)
- * Club domestic league appearances and goals

Robert Whitehead (22 September 1936 – 6 March 2019) was an English footballer who made 73 appearances in the Football League playing as a right back for Newcastle United and Darlington in the 1950s and 1960s. He also played in the Southern League for Cambridge City.

== Football career ==
Whitehead was born in Ashington, Northumberland, and played for local club Fatfield Athletic before turning professional with Newcastle United in December 1954. He made his first-team debut on 28 September 1957 in the First Division match against Burnley, during an influenza epidemic, and played twice more in December 1958. He had a run of games at the end of the 1958–59 season and the start of the next, but his 20th appearance, on 26 December 1959 in a draw with Chelsea, was his last senior match for the club.

He spent time with Southern League club Cambridge City, before returning to the Football League with Darlington of the Fourth Division in 1962. He quickly established himself in the first team, partnering the long-serving Brian Henderson at full back. On 4 January 1964, he was making his 53rd league appearance for the club, at home to Stockport County, when he was stretchered off the field with a broken leg. Within minutes, the same thing happened to Henderson. Neither man played professionally again.

== Death ==
Whitehead died in March 2019, aged 82.
