= Bill Hand =

English footballer

Personal information
- Date of birth: 5 July 1898
- Place of birth: Codnor, Derbyshire, England
- Height: 5 ft 6 in (1.68 m)
- Position: Forward

Senior career*
Years	Team	Apps	(Gls)
?–1920	Sutton Town		
1920–1925	Crystal Palace	100	(15)
- * Club domestic league appearances and goals

William R. Hand (5 July 1898 – ) was an English professional footballer, who played in the Football League for Crystal Palace as a forward. He also played non-league football for Sutton Town.

== Playing career ==
Hand began his career with Sutton Town, and was signed by Crystal Palace in October 1920. He made 100 league appearances (15 goals) for Palace between then and October 1925 when his contract, along with that of Dick Strang, was cancelled due to breach of contract.
