= Palmerston Park =

Football stadium in Dumfries, Scotland

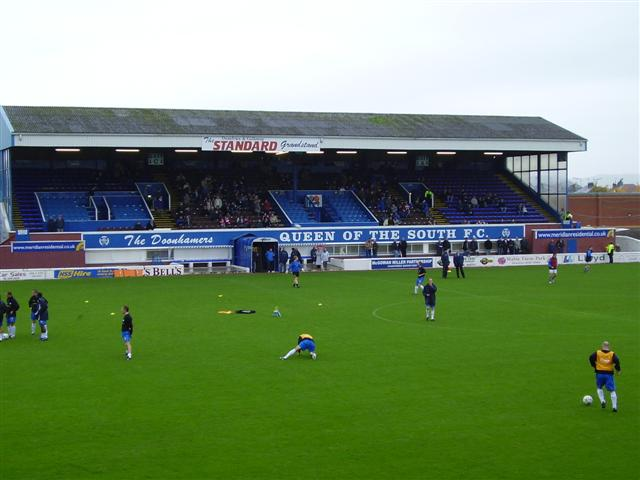
- The main stand at Palmerston Park

- Location in Dumfries and Galloway
- Location: Dumfries, Scotland
- Coordinates: 55°04′13″N 3°37′29″W
- Owner: Queen of the South FC
- Capacity: 8,690 (3,377 seated)
- Surface: Artificial Turf

Construction
- Opened: 1919

Tenants
- Queen of the South F.C. (1919–present); Heston Rovers F.C. (2013–present); 5th Kirkcudbrightshire Rifle Volunteers F.C. (1879–1896)

Palmerston Park is a football stadium on Terregles Street in Dumfries, Dumfries and Galloway, Scotland. It is the home ground of Scottish League One club Queen of the South, who have played there since 1919. South of Scotland League club Heston Rovers have shared Palmerston since 2013. The stadium has a capacity of 8,690 of which 3,377 are seats.

== History ==
Palmerston Park was first opened in 1919, when Queen of the South were formed, although football had been played at the site since the 1870s. The site of the ground was formerly a farm called Palmers Toun. This is on the Maxwelltown side of the River Nith in Dumfries. Jimmy McKinnell, Tom Wylie and Willie McCall were all sold to Blackburn Rovers around the same time by Queen of the South. This combined with the sale of Ian Dickson to Aston Villa helped to fund the purchase of Palmerston Park in 1921 for £1,500.

The Portland Drive Terrace was covered with a roof in 1959, although the floodlights were installed beforehand, as these were first used in a match versus Preston North End in October 1958. These are the tallest free standing floodlights in Scottish football, standing at 85 feet. The current main stand was constructed in 1965, soon after the original had burned down.

On the east side of the ground "Jimmy Jolly's Bullshed", later known as the "Coo Shed", was originally named after one of the founder members of the club in 1919, when it was built around 1933 as the club reached the first division for the first time. This was replaced by an all seater stand in 1995 and was named the East Stand. A challenge game was held in April 1995 to commemorate the opening of the new stand and Queens' 75th anniversary against Rangers. Guest players for Queens in the 2–2 draw included Davie Irons, future managers Rowan Alexander and Ian McCall, Ted McMinn, Andy Thomson. Scenes from the film A Shot at Glory, starring Robert Duvall, were shot at Palmerston Park during 1999.

The club was relegated to the Scottish Second Division in 2012, but carried out some remedial work to the stadium, including new water systems and ticket offices. A redevelopment of the 1960s main stand is planned. During March 2013, Queen of the South were given approval to install a new 5G artificial pitch at Palmerston Park for the start of the 2013–14 season. After the club's final home game of the 2012–13 season, the club sold the turf for £10 per square yard as well as auctioning seven special lots. These were the four corner plots, the two penalty spots and Ryan McCann's 84-yard spot.

== Structure and facilities ==
Of the 8,690 capacity, there are 3,377 seats. Up until the late 1990s the stadium had a capacity of 8,352, but this was reduced when the Terregles Street end terracing was closed. It was given a safety certificate in September 2014, adding standing capacity of 1,968.

There are 2,192 seats in the all seated East Stand. For the 2012–13 season this stand was known as the Galloway News Stand, then from 2013–14 until the 2017–18 season this stand was known as the Rosefield Salvage Stand. For the 2018–19 season, Queens centenary, the stand will be known as the BDS Digital Stand. On 9 March 2021, BDS Digital agreed to continue their sponsorship of the East Stand until May 2024.

Opposite this is the main stand, built in 1965, which now has 1,185 seats. The main stand is a small, classic looking covered stand, where the seating area is raised. There are standing terraces for fans to the left and in front of this stand. Since the 2013–14 season the main stand has been known as the Gates Power Transmission Stand. On 9 March 2021, Alpha Solway committed to sponsoring the main stand until May 2024.

The Portland Drive Terrace, with a capacity of 3,345 is a traditional standing area and is now the largest area of covered terracing in Scotland and is reminiscent of all British football grounds prior to the Hillsborough disaster. The terrace is notable for the clock face mounted in the centre of the roof that used to be an advert for a local hostelry, where Time to Visit The Hole I' The Wa' was written underneath the clock. Since the 2015–16 season the terrace has been known as the Oakbank Terrace. On 9 March 2021, Oakbank agreed to continue their sponsorship of the Portland Drive Terrace until May 2024.

The grass playing surface was widely recognised for its good condition. Iain McChesney described the surface as simply a 'good park'. Jocky Dempster later said in an interview that among his reasons for signing for Queens was, "I liked the park at Queens. As you know it’s a good park, a good surface." Crawford Boyd said, "It was a lovely park, it was a treat to play on that park, a lovely playing surface." Ted McMinn commented, "Palmerston was like a bowling green, you knew when you went to kick the ball you wouldn’t get a bobble."

== Attendances ==
Crowds for Queen of the South fixtures are normally around 2,000 people, unless there is a major cup game against higher league opposition. The first league game against local rivals Gretna at the end of August 2006 attracted almost 5,500 spectators, which was the highest league attendance since 2002. There was a full house at Queens' match against Hibs in the 2006–07 Scottish Cup. Similarly, over 6,000 watched the victory over Dundee in the 2007–08 Scottish Cup.

Modern attendances are small in comparison with Queens' heyday in the 1930s, 1940s, and 1950s. For example, 10,948 watched the team featuring Willie Savage, Willie Culbert and Willie Ferguson in Queens first ever game in the top flight of Scottish football in 1933, the 3–2 win against Celtic. 13,000 watched a Queens side managed by George McLachlan and captained by Savage knock Rangers out of the Scottish Cup in January 1937. The highest recorded attendance at Palmerston Park was set on 23 February 1952, when a crowd of 26,552 squeezed very tightly in to see Queens play in a Scottish Cup third round tie against Hearts. Jackie Oakes scored the only Queens goal in a 3–1 defeat.

== Other uses ==
The stadium held its first live concert in June 2015, with performances by Status Quo, Big Country and Reef.

== Transport ==
Dumfries railway station, which is served by trains on the Glasgow South Western Line, is the closest railway station to Palmerston Park. The walk between the two sites takes between 15 and 20 minutes. The A75 road bypasses Dumfries; people travelling to Palmerston from the north or east should follow the A76 road (Glasgow Road) into Dumfries, then the A780 road and Terregles Street lead to Palmerston. Car parking is available in surrounding streets and in the Ice Bowl behind the Rosefield Salvage Stand.
