= David Moir (footballer) =

English footballer

Personal information
- Full name: David Leslie Moir
- Date of birth: 2 May 1897
- Place of birth: Heaton, Newcastle, England
- Date of death: 1969 (aged 72)
- Place of death: North Walsham, Norfolk, England
- Height: 5 ft 11 1/2 in (1.82 m)
- Position: Centre half

Senior career*
Years	Team	Apps	(Gls)
1921–1923	Tottenham Hotspur	0	(0)
–	London University		
1923	Northampton Town	0	(0)
1923	Darlington	1	(0)
- * Club domestic league appearances and goals

David Leslie Moir (2 May 1897 – q4 1969) was an English footballer who played as a centre half in the Football League for Darlington. He was on the books of Tottenham Hotspur without playing League football for them, and also played for London University.

== Life and career ==
Moir was born in Heaton, Newcastle, the second child of David Moir, a police constable, and his wife Elizabeth. He began his senior football career with Tottenham Hotspur, but never played for the first team. He played for London University's football team, and had a month's trial in early 1923 with Northampton Town, who were looking for a stand-in to allow player-manager Bob Hewison to concentrate on his managerial duties. His only appearance in the Football League was for Darlington on 1 September 1923, deputising for Billy Robinson in the Third Division North match against Accrington Stanley; Darlington lost 2–0.

The 1939 Register finds Moir living with his wife, Margaret, and two children in Bodenham Road, Birmingham, working as a commercial traveller (branch manager), and serving as a special constable. He died in 1969 in the North Walsham area of Norfolk.
