= Percy Sutcliffe =

English footballer

Personal information
- Full name: Percy Sutcliffe
- Date of birth: 28 July 1889
- Place of birth: Ramsbottom, England
- Date of death: 1971 (aged 81–82)
- Height: 5 ft 8 in (1.73 m)
- Position: Centre half

Senior career*
Years	Team	Apps	(Gls)
- Ramsbottom
191?–1912	Haslingden		
1912–1914	Norwich City		
1914–1923	Darlington (Note: Football League figures only)	53	(0)
1923–1924	Hartlepools United	19	(0)
- * Club domestic league appearances and goals

Percy Sutcliffe (28 July 1889 – 1971) was an English footballer who made 72 appearances in the Football League playing as a centre half for Darlington and Hartlepools United in the 1920s. He also played Southern League football for Norwich City.

== Life and career ==
Sutcliffe was born in 1889 in Ramsbottom, Lancashire. He began his senior football career with Southern League club Norwich City, and made his first-team debut on 21 December 1912 against Reading. He was a regular in the side, making 61 appearances and scoring 4 goals in all senior competitions in the one-and-a-half seasons he spent with the club.

Together with Norwich teammate Billy Ingham, Sutcliffe signed professional terms with North-Eastern League club Darlington ahead of the 1914–15 season; the pair linked up again with Aaron Travis, with whom both had played at Norwich and who had joined Darlington some months earlier. He helped them reach the first round proper of the 1914–15 FA Cup, in which they faced Bradford City of the First Division. Although Darlington paid Bradford too much respect, the Yorkshire Post picked out Sutcliffe and Eddie Hanlon as "effective spoilers of their opponents' tactics".

He returned to the Darlington side after the First World War to play his part in their second North-Eastern League title, in 1920–21, and subsequent election to the Football League in its newly formed Northern Section of the Third Division. He still retained the good opinions of his former employers: when Darlington hosted Norwich in the FA Cup in 1919, "the visiting directors held a wholesome respect for Sutcliffe, whom they classed as a really good half-back." Ahead of the next round, against Second Division Birmingham, the Daily Express described the Darlington half-back line – Sutcliffe, George Malcolm and Hughie Dickson – as having acquired "a reputation for upsetting opponents' designs".

Sutcliffe played at centre half in Darlington's first match in the Football League, a 2–0 win against Halifax Town, captained the team, and at the end of the 1921–22 season, in recognition of his five years' service, a benefit match was played against Middlesbrough attended by 8,000 spectators. His services were retained for 1922–23, and by the end of that season he had played 53 Football League matches. Darlington offered him a new contract, but he considered the terms unacceptable, and was given a free transfer.

He spent his final season in senior football with near neighbours Hartlepools United. He began the season as a first-team regular, but was dropped from the side in January and appeared only once more. He left Hartlepools at the end of the season and ended his Football League career.
