= Tom Wylie (footballer, born 1896) =

Scottish footballer

Thomas Wylie (born 14 March 1896) was a professional footballer who played for Queen of the South, Blackburn Rovers and Swindon Town.

A left back from Darvel in Ayrshire, Wylie joined Queens from Galston in August 1920 (neither were Scottish Football League members at that time) and made nine appearances and scored three goals for the club before he joined Blackburn Rovers in February 1921. He was the last of three players to make such a move in a short time frame, after Jimmy McKinnell and Willie McCall. This (along with the transfer of Ian Dickson to Aston Villa) helped fund the Dumfries club's purchase of Palmerston Park.

Wylie left Blackburn in 1926 after 174 Football League First Division appearances and 17 in the FA Cup. He had a short spell with neighbouring Darwen, then joined Swindon Town; he remained in Wiltshire until 1930 when he returned to Ayrshire and appeared for Junior sides Beith and Irvine Meadow.
