= Colin Sinclair (footballer) =

Scottish footballer

Personal information
- Full name: Colin MacLean Sinclair
- Date of birth: 1 December 1947 (age 78)
- Place of birth: Edinburgh, Scotland
- Height: 5 ft 10 in (1.78 m)
- Position: Forward

Senior career*
| Years | Team | Apps | (Gls) |
| – | Linlithgow Rose | | |
| 1969–1971 | Raith Rovers | 49 | (14) |
| 1971–1976 | Darlington | 203 | (59) |
| 1976–1977 | Hereford United | 22 | (2) |
| 1977 | → Dunfermline Athletic (loan) | 4 | (0) |
| 1977–1979 | Newport County | 30 | (5) |
| – | Linlithgow Rose | | |
- * Club domestic league appearances and goals

Colin MacLean Sinclair (born 1 December 1947) is a Scottish former professional footballer who played in the Scottish Football League for Raith Rovers and Dunfermline Athletic, and in the English Football League for Darlington, Hereford United and Newport County. A forward, he made more than 300 League appearances in all, and ended his career where it had begun, with Scottish junior club Linlithgow Rose.

Sinclair was a member of the Darlington "Dream Team" selected in 2003 via a competition in the club's match programme, as part of the "Farewell to Feethams" celebrations when the club left its longtime home ground.

After retiring from football he went on to develop a successful career in both the licensed and hotel trades from his base in Linlithgow.
