= Gordon Cattrell =

English footballer

Personal information
- Full name: Gordon William Cattrell
- Date of birth: 18 December 1954 (age 71)
- Place of birth: Sunderland, England
- Position: Midfielder

Youth career
- 1970–1972: Leeds United

Senior career*
Years	Team	Apps	(Gls)
1972–1973	Leeds United	0	(0)
1973–1976	Darlington	102	(5)
1976–19??	Bishop Auckland		

International career
1970	England Schoolboys	5	(0)
- * Club domestic league appearances and goals

Gordon William Cattrell (born 18 December 1954) is an English former professional footballer who made 102 appearances in the Football League playing as a midfielder for Darlington. He began his professional career as an apprentice with Leeds United, but never played for the first team, and after leaving Darlington he played non-league football for Bishop Auckland.

As a youngster, Cattrell represented Durham schools at under-15 level, and made five appearances for the England Schools under-15 team, including against West German Schoolboys at Roker Park, Sunderland, in May 1970.
