= Robert L. Simpson Jr. =

American computer scientist (1946–2020)

- Born: July 28, 1946
- Died: December 26, 2020 (aged 74)
- Occupation: Computer scientist

Robert L. Simpson Jr. (July 28, 1946 – December 26, 2020) was an American computer scientist specializing in applied artificial intelligence. He served as chief scientist at Applied Systems Intelligence, Inc. (ASI), where he led the development of the company's core technology, PreAct. ASI later rebranded as Veloxiti Inc.

== Career ==
Simpson's research career included significant roles in government, academia and the private sector. At the Georgia Tech Research Institute (GTRI), he served as a principal research scientist. His work there included co-leading an ARDA-funded project, "Case-Based Reasoning for Knowledge Discovery", which sought to model the implicit processes used by intelligence analysts. He also conducted studies on Internet Voting, focusing on the technical and policy implications of data privacy and security.

As a principal investigator at IET, Simpson managed a DARPA project evaluating cognitive systems for the Personalized Assistants that Learn program. He also worked on the DARPA Fast Connectivity for Coalition and Agents Project (FastC2AP), which demonstrated the use of agent-based technology for interoperability in military architectures.

Simpson is recognized for his early contributions to Case-based reasoning. In 1985, he became the first student to receive a Ph.D. under Janet Kolodner at the Georgia Tech Department of Information and Computer Science.

=== NCR Corporation ===
During a ten-year tenure at NCR Corporation, Simpson was a member of the Corporate Technology staff and director of the Human Interface Technology Center (HITC). His work at the HITC focused on intelligent software agents, image understanding and spoken language. While at NCR, he served on the Privacy Steering Committee and represented the company on the World Wide Web Consortium (W3C) Privacy Outreach Committee. He also contributed to the establishment of the International Security Trust and Privacy Alliance. During this period, he secured research and development contracts from DARPA and the National Institute of Standards and Technology (NIST).

=== Military service ===
Simpson served in the United States Air Force (USAF), retiring as a lieutenant colonel in 1990. From 1985 to 1990, he was the Program Manager for Machine Intelligence at DARPA. In this capacity, he managed research investments for the Strategic Computing Program, overseeing developments in knowledge-based systems, automated planning and machine learning. His work during this era was documented in an oral history recorded by the IT History Society.

== Major publications ==
- Simpson, Robert; Rouff, Christopher; Roberts, Joe and Edwards, Gary. "An Autonomic System for Close Air Support." In Proceedings of Sixth IEEE Conference and Workshops on Engineering of Autonomic and Autonomous Systems, San Francisco, CA. April 14–16, 2009.
- Simpson, Robert and Twardy, Charles. "Refining the Cognitive Decathlon." In Proceedings of Performance Evaluation of Intelligent Systems – PerMIS08. Aug 19-21, 2008, NIST, Bethesda, MD.
- Whitaker, Elizabeth and Simpson, Robert. "The Evolution and Evaluation of an Internet Search Tool for Information Analysts," In Proceedings of 20th Annual FLAIRS Conference, Key West, FL., 7–9 May 2007.
- Whitaker, Elizabeth; Simpson, Robert; Burkhart, Laura; MacTavish, Reid and Lobb, Collin. "Cognitive Factors in Homeland Defense: Reusing Intelligence Analysts' Search Plans." In Proceedings of Human Factors and Ergonomics '04, New Orleans, LA., 20–24 September 2004.
- Whitaker, Elizabeth and Simpson, Robert. "Case-Based Reasoning in Support of Intelligence Analysis," In Proceedings of 17th Annual FLAIRS Conference, Miami, FL., 17–19 May 2004.
- Whitaker, Elizabeth and Simpson, Robert. "Case-Based Reasoning for Knowledge Discovery," In Proceedings of Human Factors and Ergonomics '03, Denver, CO., 13–17 October 2003.
- Mark, William and Simpson, Robert L. "Knowledge-Based Systems: An Overview," IEEE Expert, Vol. 6 Number 3, June 1991; pp. 12–17.
- Simpson, Robert L. "Computer Vision: An Overview," IEEE Expert, Vol. 6 Number 4, August 1991; pp. 11–15.
- Barber, J., Bhatta, S., Goel, A., Jacobson, M., Pearce, M., Penberthy, L., Shankar, M., Simpson, R. & Stroulia, E. 1992 AskJef: Integration of case-based and multimedia technologies for interface design support. In Gero, J. S., editor, Artificial Intelligence in Design '92, pp. 457–474. Dordrecht: Kluwer.
- Griffith, A, Simpson, R. and Blatt, L. "Interface Lab: A Case-Based Interface Design Assistant," In Proceedings of CAIA '94, San Antonio, 1–4 March. 1994, IEEE Computer Society Press.
- Simpson, Robert L., "DOD Applications of Artificial Intelligence: Success and Prospects," Proceedings of the SPIE Conference on Applications of Artificial Intelligence VI, Vol. 937, 1988.
- Simpson, Robert L., "Applications of AI Capability," SIGNAL, 1986.
- Simpson, Robert L., "A Computer Model of Case-Based Reasoning in Problem Solving: An Investigation in the Domain of Dispute Mediation," Report #GIT-ICS-85/18, School of Information and Computer Science, Georgia Institute of Technology, Atlanta, GA, June, 1985.
- Kolodner, J.; Simpson, R; and Sycara, K., "A Process Model of Case-Based Reasoning in Problem Solving," Proceedings of the Ninth International Joint Conference on Artificial Intelligence, pp. 284–290; Morgan Kaufmann Publisher, Inc., August, 1985.
- Kolodner, J.; Simpson, R., "The MEDIATOR: Analysis of an Early Case-Based Problem Solver," Cognitive Science, Vol. 13, Number 4, October–December, 1989, pp. 507–549.
- Kolodner, J.; Simpson, R., "Experience and Problem Solving: A Framework." In Proceedings of the Sixth Annual Conference of the Cognitive Science Society, Boulder, CO, 1984.

== Sources ==
- Norberg, Arthur (1990). "An Interview with Robert L. Simpson, Jr" (PDF).
- Overpeck, J. T.; Webb, T.; Prentice, I. C. (January 1985). "Quantitative interpretation of fossil pollen spectra: Dissimilarity coefficients and the method of modern analogs". Quaternary Research. 23 (1): 87–108. Bibcode:1985QuRes..23...87O. doi:10.1016/0033-5894(85)90074-2.
- Slade, Stephen (March 1, 1991). "Case-Based Reasoning: A Research Paradigm". AI Magazine. 12 (1): 42–55. doi:10.1609/aimag.v12i1.883.
