= Dick Strang =

Scottish footballer

Personal information
- Full name: Richard Strang
- Date of birth: 19 March 1900
- Place of birth: Rutherglen, Scotland
- Date of death: 15 February 1971 (aged 70)
- Place of death: Darlington, England
- Height: 6 ft 0 in (1.83 m)
- Position: Centre half

Senior career*
Years	Team	Apps	(Gls)
1923–1924	Birmingham	0	(0)
1924–1925	Crystal Palace	24	(0)
1925–1926	Poole		
1926–192?	Worcester City		(1)
1929–1932	Halifax Town	99	(2)
1932–1933	Northampton Town	7	(0)
1933–1938	Darlington	171	(2)
Total		301	(4)
- * Club domestic league appearances and goals

Richard Strang (19 March 1900 – 15 February 1971) was a Scottish footballer who made 301 appearances in the English Football League playing as a centre half for Crystal Palace, Halifax Town, Northampton Town and Darlington in the 1920s and 1930s. He began his professional career with Birmingham, but never represented that club in competitive first-team football, and also played non-league football for Poole and Worcester City.

== Life and career ==
Strang was born in Rutherglen. He was playing for a junior club in Glasgow when English First Division club Birmingham beat off competition to sign him in September 1923. He never appeared for Birmingham's first team, and was allowed to leave the club on a free transfer the following May for Third Division South team Crystal Palace. Described in the Derby Daily Telegraph as a "lean and lanky" centre-half with competence in both the defensive and the creative aspects of his role – "a rare breaker-up and knows a thing or two about feeding his forwards" – Strang had progressed well with Palace and become a regular in the team when, in October 1925, he and forward Bill Hand were charged with breach of contract in respect of training requirements and given two weeks' notice to leave the club.

He initially signed for Poole of the Western League, then moved into the Birmingham & District League with Worcester City. He scored once in league competition, and also scored the winning goal in the semi-final of the 1927 Worcestershire Senior Cup against Stourbridge; Worcester lost to Cradley Heath in the final after a replay.

Strang returned to the Football League with Halifax Town of the Third Division North in 1929. He played 99 league matches over three seasons, and his "heroic" performance in an FA Cup tie in 1931 made a major contribution to the struggling club's survival. In those days, progress in the FA Cup provided a significant income stream, and in 1931, the club was on the verge of financial failure. Drawn away to Newark Town in the first round, Halifax conceded an early goal, but after Newark lost a man to injury, they equalised by half-time. The second half was a rearguard action as Halifax clung on to the draw, and then won the replay and their second-round tie before losing in the third round:

One of the tensest struggles I have ever seen followed. Town had to defend as if for dear life – they simply dare not lose – while Newark attacked like furies. In the last 15 minutes the suspense was almost unbearable, ... Dick Strang, at centre halfback, was a hero for Halifax Town on that never-to-be-forgotten day."

His services were not retained at the end of the 1931–32 season, and he and Halifax teammate John McFarlane moved on to Northampton Town. Strang was little used in Northampton's first team, and in the summer of 1933, he joined Darlington, for whom he played 171 matches in the Third Division North before finishing his senior career in 1938.

Strang died in Darlington, County Durham, in 1971 at the age of 70.
