= Kevan Smith (footballer) =

English footballer (born 1959)

Personal information
- Full name: Kevan Smith
- Date of birth: 13 December 1959 (age 66)
- Place of birth: Eaglescliffe, England
- Height: 6 ft 3 in (1.91 m)
- Position: Defender

Senior career*
Years	Team	Apps	(Gls)
1979–1985	Darlington	245	(11)
1985–1986	Rotherham United	59	(4)
1986–1988	Coventry City	6	(0)
1988–1989	York City	31	(5)
1989–1993	Darlington	98	(5)
1992	→ Hereford United (loan)	6	(0)
1993	Sliema Wanderers		(1)
1993–1994	Hereford United	18	(0)
1994	Whitby Town		(0)
- * Club domestic league appearances and goals

Kevan Smith (born 13 December 1959) is an English former footballer who played as a defender. Smith is best known for his time at Darlington, for whom he made over 340 appearances. He participated in three of Darlington's promotions.

== Career ==
Smith first appeared for his local team, Darlington, when he was on trial in a game against the club's professionals under Len Walker, before playing in the reserves against Barnsley. In the summer of 1979, Walker left Darlington, but newly appointed manager Billy Elliott invited Smith back.

Smith made his debut against Torquay United in September 1979 as the Quakers lost 4–0. Teammate Clive Nattress called him 'Smudger', a nickname that stuck with him for the rest of his time at the club. Smith was known as a brave, hard-working, and committed player.

However, it was under Elliott's successor Cyril Knowles, who said he could not believe Smudger was a footballer, that Smith really came into his own and by his own admission, improved as a player. Knowles, who joined Darlington in 1983, was a very demanding manager, and the 1984/85 season saw Darlington promoted from the Fourth Division, but Smith left for Rotherham feeling the manager did not rate him highly enough.

Smith later moved to Coventry City for £65,000. He was in the Coventry squad when they won the FA Cup, although he did not play. Smith played only a handful of top-flight games for the Sky Blues, partly due to injury. He moved to York City in 1988, but his brief time at the club was unsuccessful.. However, both Darlington and rivals Hartlepool United were interested in securing his services.

Smith rejoined Darlington, who had recently been relegated to the Conference, after speaking to Brian Little. In under a year, Smith had dropped from the top of English football to the bottom. But this second spell at Darlington would prove to be the best years of Smith's career.

Darlington won promotion from the Conference at the first attempt, and the following season (1990/91) were promoted from the Fourth Division to the Third. Little then left to join Leicester City, which was a significant blow to Smith, who begged him to stay as the pair were very close. Little recommended Smith for the management job at Darlington, but instead Smudger convinced Frank Gray to take the job. Rumours persisted about Smith taking over as the Quakers struggled in the higher league. Smith tried to quash the rumours but was dropped by Gray.

Smith felt he was too young for the job, but when Gray left the club in 1992, he applied for the position. However, Ray Hankin was given the position on a temporary measure. Smith had hoped to get the job and had an interview, though the Quakers installed Billy McEwan on a permanent basis. The pair's relationship was rocky at best. In the summer of 1992 Smith required a major operation and was told he would need ten weeks to recover but came back after nine. Upon his return, McEwan said he wanted a new center back.

McEwan and Smith continued to have a strained relationship, with McEwan eventually informing Smith he was being released on a free transfer. By this stage, Smith was close to a testimonial and refused to leave. The relationship between the pair continued to deteriorate, causing Smith to be further isolated and training on his own. Towards the end of his time at the club, Smith regained his place in the team.

Between September 1997 and October 1998 Smith was joint Manager of Northern League club Crook Town working with former Darlington teammate Paul Cross.

The public and fanzine Mission Impossible backed the player. Smith returned to the Quakers to work for them as Football in the Community (FITC) Officer and went on to be Assistant Manager at Hull City with Little.

== Honours ==
Darlington

- Football League Fourth Division: 1990–91; third-place promotion: 1984–85
- Football Conference: 1989–Football Conference1989–90
