= Willie McCall (footballer, born 1898) =

Scottish footballer

Personal information
- Date of birth: 8 October 1899
- Place of birth: Kirkton, Dumfries and Galloway, Scotland
- Date of death: 22 March 1965 (aged 65)
- Place of death: Dumfries, Scotland
- Height: 5 ft 9 in (1.75 m)
- Position: Outside forward

Youth career
- 1918–1919: Maxwelltown Juniors

Senior career*
Years	Team	Apps	(Gls)
1919–1920	Queen of the South	34	(14)
1920–1922	Blackburn Rovers	11	(0)
1922–1923	Wolverhampton Wanderers	15	(1)
1923	Southampton	8	(2)
1925–19??	Queen of the South		
- Carlisle United
- * Club domestic league appearances and goals

William McCall (8 October 1899 – 22 March 1965) was a professional footballer who played as a forward for Dumfries-based club Queen of the South in Scotland, and Blackburn Rovers, Wolverhampton Wanderers and Southampton in England in the 1920s.

== Football career ==
McCall was born in Maxwelltown, then a separate burgh from Dumfries across the River Nith. While a pupil at Glasgow Street School, he was the captain of the Scottish Schoolboys' team.

He served in the Great War with the 5th Battalion, King's Own Scottish Borderers, and after the war returned to football, and the Maxwelltown Juniors (known locally as the "Fish Suppers"). Joining Queen of the South in 1919, the year of their formation, he played for Queen's as a forward during his stay at Palmerston. McCall made 24 appearances in season 1919–20 scoring 11 goals and ten appearances in season 1920–21 scoring three goals.

McCall was a goalscorer along with left winger, Dave Halliday, for then non-league Queen of the South as they won the Dumfries Charity Cup Final in 1920 defeating Dalbeattie Star. This was the first ever trophy win for fledgling Queens.

McCall moved from Queen of the South to Blackburn Rovers in December 1920. McCall was one of the three players to make such a move in a short time frame along with Jimmy McKinnell and Tom Wylie. This along with the transfer of Ian Dickson to Aston Villa helped fund Queens' purchase of Palmerston Park.

McCall made only 11 league appearances for Blackburn before joining Wolverhampton Wanderers in June 1922.

After six months at Molineux, McCall moved to the south coast to join Southampton in January 1923 in an exchange deal with George Getgood joining Wolves. McCall had a reputation for being quick and scored on his debut at The Dell against Coventry City on 10 February. Although McCall scored again in March, he lost his place to Len Andrews and soon became disillusioned. He left the club in May 1923 and was transfer listed at £500. It was not until September 1925 that he eventually found a new club, back with Queen of the South, at a reduced fee of £250.

McCall finished his professional playing career with Carlisle United.

== Later career ==
He became trainer for a local team in Dumfries, Troqueer Juniors. McCall worked with the Caledonian bus company at their Eastfield Road premises in Dumfries.

Aged 68 he died in Dumfries Infirmary. He was survived by his wife, son and married daughter. His son flew into Prestwick Airport for the funeral from Canada where he had been living for 11 years.
