= Norman Lees =

English footballer

Personal information
- Full name: Norman Lees
- Date of birth: 17 November 1948
- Place of birth: Newcastle upon Tyne, England
- Height: 5 ft 9 in (1.75 m)
- Position: Midfielder

Youth career
- –: Hull City

Senior career*
Years	Team	Apps	(Gls)
1966–1971	Hull City	5	(0)
1970–1971	→ Hartlepool (loan)	20	(1)
1971–1977	Darlington	120	(5)
198?–198?	Beograd-Woodville		

Managerial career
- 1986: Parafield Gardens
- 1986–1987: Beograd-Woodville
- 1988–1989: Modbury
- 1990–1992: Cumberland United
- 1998–1999: White City Woodville
- * Club domestic league appearances and goals

Norman Lees (born 17 November 1948) is an English former footballer who made 145 appearances in the Football League playing as a defender for Hull City, Hartlepool and Darlington in the 1960s and 1970s. He continued his career in Australia as player and coach.

== Life and career ==
Lees was born in Newcastle upon Tyne. He began his football career as an apprentice with Hull City, and made his first-team debut for the club on the last day of the 1966–67 Football League season, in a 4–1 defeat away to Crystal Palace in the Second Division. Over the next three and a half years, he made just five more senior appearances for Hull, and in December 1970, he joined Fourth Division club Hartlepool on loan. He scored Hartlepool's first goal in his debut match, a 2–1 win at home to York City, and played regularly for the remainder of the season, finishing with 20 appearances, all in league competition.

In the 1971 close season, Lees moved on to Darlington, also a Fourth Division club. He was involved in one potentially disastrous incident while playing in a floodlit match at the Darlington's Feethams ground. While retrieving the ball, which had gone out of play, he noticed that rubbish beneath a wooden stand had caught fire. Fortunately the fire had not taken hold and was quickly extinguished. Over six seasons he scored 5 goals from 120 league appearances before his contract was cancelled in 1977.

Lees continued his football career with 15 years in Australia, first as a player and later, after taking courses under the auspices both of the Australian Soccer Federation and the English Football Association, as a coach. After coaching amateur team Parafield Gardens, he was appointed head coach of South Australia State League team Beograd-Woodville in December 1986, but was dismissed in mid-season after the club committee disagreed with his selection policy.

After his successor resigned early the following season, Lees was offered an apology and his old job back. He was by then committed to a junior coaching role at West Adelaide Hellas, but a couple of months later was appointed head coach of Modbury, newly promoted to the State League. Ahead of the 1990 season, he was appointed assistant to Arthur Ruttley at Port Adelaide; three months later, Ruttley was sacked and Lees "resigned in protest", again over a matter of team selection. Appointed head coach of Cumberland United ahead of the 1991 season, Lees resigned his post in March 1992 and returned to England.

He remained in England for a six-year period, then resumed his coaching career in 1998 with a year as head coach of White City Woodville. After making a final return to England, he worked for a printing firm on Tyneside.
