= Dave Carr (footballer, born 1937) =

English footballer

Personal information
- Date of birth: 19 January 1937
- Place of birth: Wheatley Hill, England
- Date of death: 12 November 2013 (aged 76)
- Position: Inside forward

Youth career
- –: Spennymoor United

Senior career*
Years	Team	Apps	(Gls)
1957–1962	Darlington	132	(42)
1962–1965	Workington	108	(47)
1965–1966	Watford	10	(3)
Total		250	(92)
- * Club domestic league appearances and goals

David Carr (19 January 1937 – 12 November 2013) was an English professional footballer who scored 92 goals from 250 appearances in the Football League playing for Darlington, Workington and Watford.

== Life and career ==
Carr was born in Wheatley Hill, County Durham, and worked as a bricklayer at the local colliery. He played football for Spennymoor United before making his debut in the Third Division North for Darlington during the 1957–58 Football League season.

Carr played his part in Darlington causing an upset in that season's FA Cup by eliminating Chelsea, who had won the league title only two years before. He scored their second goal as they took a 3–0 lead at Stamford Bridge, but Chelsea made the final score 3–3 to earn a replay. Because of injuries, Carr was moved to outside right, a position he had never played, for the replay, but according to the Manchester Guardian, "he had his share of that inspiration that lifted the whole team high above its normal form". The score after 90 minutes was 1–1. In the first nine minutes of extra time, Darlington scored three times to take the match 4–1. Carr, who was by then playing at centre-forward because Ron Harbertson had injured a shoulder, scored the second of those three with a header after Tommy Moran's blocked shot had rebounded to him.

In his five years in Darlington's first team, Carr scored 42 league goals from 132 matches. He moved on to Workington in 1962, and was part of the team that won promotion from the Fourth Division in 1964 under Ken Furphy's management. The following season, Carr scored one of Workington's five goals as they knocked First Division Blackburn Rovers out of the League Cup. He scored 47 goals in 108 league games for Workington before following Furphy to Watford, but his career was ended by a car accident not long after his arrival.

Carr returned to the north-east, where he died on 12 November 2013 at the age of 76.
