= Matthew Cornock =

Scottish footballer

Personal information
- Full name: Matthew Cornock
- Date of birth: 23 June 1890
- Place of birth: Chapelhall, Scotland
- Date of death: 1961 (aged 70–71)
- Height: 5 ft 7 in (1.70 m)
- Positions: Centre forward; inside forward

Senior career*
Years	Team	Apps	(Gls)
1909–1910	Airdrieonians	0	(0)
1910–1911	Darlington		(6)
1911–1912	Barnsley	12	(5)
1912–19??	Castleford Town		
1919–19??	Bellshill Athletic		
19??–1921	Plean Juniors		
1921–1924	Stenhousemuir	73	(30)
1924	Albion Rovers	9	(5)
1924–1925	Forfar Athletic	7	(3)
1925–192?	Queen of the South	2	(0)
- * Club domestic league appearances and goals

Matthew Cornock (23 June 1890 – 1961), also commonly known as Matt Cornock, was a Scottish footballer who played in the Scottish Football League for Stenhousemuir, Albion Rovers, Forfar Athletic and Queen of the South and in the English Football League for Barnsley. A centre forward or inside forward, Cornock also played non-league football in England and Junior football in Scotland.

== Early life and career ==
Cornock was born in Chapelhall, near Airdrie in Lanarkshire. He played football for a local club (Note: The English National Football Archive gives Douglas Park, while John Litster's Record of Pre-War Scottish League Players has Douglas Water.) and then joined Division One club Airdrieonians in May 1909. At the end of his first season with the club, during which he failed to play a competitive first-team match, he was listed as open to transfer. After making an appearance for Airdrieonians in a benefit match in September 1910, Cornock moved into English non-league football three weeks later.

== Football in England ==
He signed for North-Eastern League club Darlington. The transfer was not completed in time for him to play in the first qualifying round of the 1910–11 FA Cup, in which Darlington won 1–0 away at Hartlepools United, but was a regular at centre forward as they progressed through five more qualifying rounds. They eliminated First Division Sheffield United to reach the second round proper, and Cornock scored the winning goal against Second Division club Bradford to take his team into the last 16, an achievement which remains the club's joint best performance in the competition. A profile in the Athletic News ahead of that match described him as "strong and bustling" with a forceful shot. Darlington were eventually eliminated by Swindon Town, who were to finish the season as Southern League champions. Cornock played regularly throughout the season, and scored six times in North-Eastern League competition.

He joined Second Division club Barnsley in May 1911 for a £25 fee, and performed well in pre-season. After their opening two fixtures brought criticism of the forwards, Barnsley omitted George Travers for the visit to Birmingham, moved George Lillycrop across to inside right, and gave Cornock his Football League debut at centre forward. Having justified his selection with two goals in a 3–1 win, he kept his place for five of the next six matches, and scored three more goals, but after two further appearances without scoring, Travers returned to the side and remained in it. Cornock was included in the 13-man training squad that prepared for FA Cup matches as Barnsley went on to win the competition, but did not make the team, although he did make a further six appearances in league competition. Barnsley chose not to retain Cornock's services, and he moved on to Midland League club Castleford Town.

== Return to Scotland ==
By 1919, he had returned to Scotland and was playing for Bellshill Athletic. He "did not exactly shine" on his debut in September, and by January 1921 had moved on to Plean Juniors, where he created a better impression. He appeared in junior international trial matches, playing for the Rest of Scotland against Fifeshire in January and for a national Junior Select against Midlothian in March, and at the end of the 1920–21 season, was selected for the Scottish Junior international tour of Norway.

In March, Cornock was reported to have "no intention of accepting the senior ticket", but in the close season, he did so, signing for Stenhousemuir, who were making their Scottish League debut in the first post-war Division Two season. He played in something more than half the league matches, and scored at a rate of a goal every other game, but in his third season, in which he played mainly at inside left rather than his customary centre-forward role, he lost form, produced only 8 goals from 28 appearances, and was not offered a new contract. The Falkirk Herald suggested that he might have been trying too hard: "a wholehearted player was Cornock, and oftener than not over-anxiety was his undoing."

He signed for Albion Rovers, also of Division Two, for the 1924–25 season, but was not there long. After playing just nine matches and scoring five goals, three of which came against his former club Stenhousemuir, Cornock signed for another Division Two club, Forfar Athletic, against whom he had scored four times in the first twenty minutes of a match two years previously while playing for Stenhousemuir. He scored a hat-trick on his debut, in a 3–1 home defeat of Dumbarton on 28 December, but after playing in the next seven fixtures without scoring, he was not persevered with. He joined Queen of the South for 1925–26, but soon lost his place to the returning Willie McCall, and made only two appearances.

Cornock died in 1961.
