= Herbert Brown (footballer) =

English footballer

Personal information
- Full name: Herbert Archibald Brown
- Place of birth: Wilton Park, County Durham, England
- Height: 5 ft 9 1/2 in (1.77 m)
- Position: Left back

Senior career*
Years	Team	Apps	(Gls)
- Shildon
1928–1932	Darlington	139	(7)
- Spennymoor United
- * Club domestic league appearances and goals

Herbert Archibald Brown (fl. 1928–1932) was an English footballer who made 139 appearances in the Football League playing for Darlington in the 1920s and 1930s. He also played non-league football for Shildon and Spennymoor United. Brown, a left back, partnered Hughie Dickson at full back in the later part of Dickson's career.
