= Alan Kamara =

English footballer

Personal information
- Date of birth: 15 July 1958 (age 68)
- Place of birth: Sheffield, England
- Height: 5 ft 9 in (1.75 m)
- Position: Defender

Senior career*
Years	Team	Apps	(Gls)
- Kiveton Park
1979–1980	York City	10	(0)
1980–1983	Darlington	134	(1)
1983–1987	Burton Albion		
1987–1990	Scarborough	159	(2)
1990–1993	Halifax Town	36	(0)
Total		339	(3)
- * Club domestic league appearances and goals

Alan Kamara (born 15 July 1958) is an English former footballer who played 339 matches in the Football League for York City, Darlington, Scarborough and Halifax Town.
