= John Peverell =

English footballer (born 1941)

Personal information
- Full name: John Richard Peverell,
- Date of birth: 17 September 1941 (age 85)
- Place of birth: Richmond, Yorkshire, England
- Position: Right back

Senior career*
Years	Team	Apps	(Gls)
- Ferryhill Athletic
1961–1972	Darlington	419	(13)
1972–1973	Stockton		
1973–1974	South Shields		
1974	Shildon		
- * Club domestic league appearances and goals

John Richard Peverell (born 17 September 1941) is an English former professional footballer who made more than 400 appearances in the Football League for Darlington, playing primarily at right back. His total of 465 appearances in all competitions for the club is second only to Ron Greener's 490. He was part of the team that won promotion to the Football League Third Division in 1966, and was selected as a member of the Darlington all-time "Dream Team" in 2003.

== Life and career ==
Peverell was born on 17 September, 1941 in Richmond, North Riding of Yorkshire. He played football for Ferryhill Athletic before joining Fourth Division club Darlington. He signed professional forms in September 1959, and made his first-team debut two years later, on 9 September, 1961 at home to Colchester United, taking the place at left back of George Mulholland who was suffering from tonsillitis; Darlington lost the match 2–0, but Peverell stayed in the team for the next match, a League Cup visit to Rotherham United of the Second Division. According to the Birmingham Post, "Rotherham never looked like scoring, but they were given their winner through a second-half own goal by Peverell". He played twice more that season, each time at left back, established himself in the first team at right half in 1962–63, and made the right-back position his own the following season.

He continued to score own goals: of the seven conceded by Darlington during the 1964–65 season, Peverell contributed four. He "thundered [the ball] in with his left foot from 30 yards (27 m)" for his first goal at the right end and the first in a 2–0 win against Hartlepools United on 28 March 1966 that took Darlington to within a point of the division leaders. He was ever-present as the team finished as runners-up – missing out on the title on goal average – and gained their first promotion since 1925. Peverell continued as first choice at right back through relegation from the Third Division and for another five seasons in the Fourth.

Peverell retired from the professional game at the end of the 1971–72 season because of what was described as a long-standing thigh injury, albeit one which had not stopped him being ever-present throughout both that season and the previous one. He made 419 league appearances for Darlington, 465 in all senior competitions, a total second only to Ron Greener's 490. He was described by the Northern Echo as "a no-nonsense right-back", and by Neil Warnock, on whom he inflicted a ruptured spleen and fractured ankle during a match in 1972, as playing like a bouncer. He was selected as a member of the Darlington "Dream Team" via a competition in the club's match programme, as part of the "Farewell to Feethams" celebrations when the club left its longtime home ground in 2003. After the ground was demolished for housing, roads on the development were named after Peverell and Greener.

He went on to play non-league football for Stockton of the Midland League, Northern Premier League club South Shields, whom he captained to the semi-finals of the 1973–74 FA Trophy, and Shildon of the Northern League. After finishing with professional football he made a career in financial services.

== Sources ==
- Tweddle, Frank (2000). The Definitive Darlington F.C. Nottingham: SoccerData. ISBN 978-1-899468-15-7.
