= Ian Dickson (footballer) =

Scottish footballer

Personal information
- Full name: Ian William Dickson
- Date of birth: 30 April 1901
- Place of birth: Maxwelltown, Scotland
- Date of death: 1956 (aged 54–55)
- Position: Centre forward

Senior career*
Years	Team	Apps	(Gls)
1919–1920	Queen of the South		
1921–1923	Aston Villa	76	(30)
1923–1925	Middlesbrough	37	(12)
1925	Wesbrough		
Total		113	(42)
- * Club domestic league appearances and goals

Ian William Dickson (30 April 1901 – 1956) was a Scottish professional footballer whose played as a forward. He played for Queen of the South, Aston Villa and Middlesbrough. He was the grandfather of another Ian Dickson, the Australian television and radio personality.

== Queen of the South ==
Dickson also had spells at Maxwelltown United and Cheshaw Juniors. Dickson and Dave Halliday both played in the trial games that were arranged when the newly formed Queen of the South was looking for players in summer 1919.

After the four trial matches, Queen of the South's first ever game took place on 16 August 1919. Invitations were sent to local councillors and magistrates and the presence of Dumfries Town Band added to the sense of occasion. The opposition was Sanquhar side Nithsdale Wanderers and the challenge game ended 2–2. Among those who played in this first game was Dickson. Halliday joined Queens in January 1920.

With this being Queen's first season after formation their fixtures were challenge games and local cup competitions. This included the Dumfries Charity Cup played over three weekends in May. On 8 May, Queens thrashed Dumfries F.C. 7–1. A week later Queens beat Solway Star 4–0 in the semi-final before facing Dalbeattie Star in the final.

A then record crowd of 4500 (many watching from the grandstand roof and other high points) watched the game. An early Halliday shot went wide following good lead up work involving Dickson. However it was Dalbeattie's physical style of play which took the lead. Queens equalised through Willie McCall (later of Blackburn Rovers) before Halliday's efforts were successful. One Halliday shot hit the post, another missed by inches, before he put Queens ahead five minutes before half time. Connell scored Queens' third goal one minute into the second half before Halliday beat Borthwick to cross for McCall to bring up a 4–1 final score.

Season 1920–21 proceeded in a similar vein with a combination of challenge games and minor cup ties. The Potts Cup, the Southern Counties Challenge Cup and the Charity all ended up at Palmerston Park. The Scottish Qualifying Cup seen Queens make the semis.

- In the Qualifying Cup first round Creetown Volunteers were thumped 9–0. Whithorn were them similarly swatted away on the end of a 12–1 defeat (Dickson hit four). Six were then put past Mid-Annandale by Queens and then five against Solway Star F.C. A 0–0 draw against Johnstone came before a 1–0 Queens replay victory. Queen's cup run then ended with the defeat to East Fife.
- In the Challenge Cup Dickson's 23rd-minute goal opened the scoring in the final in wintry conditions played at Thornhill. After Gray of Queens knocked the Nithsdale Wanderers goalkeeper off his feet in the second half, around half a dozen unruly Wanderers' fans invaded the pitch brandishing flags and sticks. A shout of 'come on' to other fans was thankfully disregarded. Police intervened to remove the fans from the pitch. Unsporting tactics from Wanderers and a disputed penalty followed before Gray knocked the goalkeeper over again, sparking a similar crowd disruption as before. Dickson's goal proved to be the winner.
- In the Potts Cup Queens beat Stranraer 3–0 before a 2–1 replay victory in the final against Nithsdale Wanderers (the initial game was 2–2)
- In the Charity Cup final again Queens were the nemesis of Nithsdale Wanderers with a 3–1 victory to bring the season to an end

Dickson was transferred from Queens in January 1921 to Aston Villa. Jimmy McKinnell from Dalbeattie, Willie McCall and Tom Wylie were all sold to Blackburn Rovers at the same time and this combined with the sale of Ian Dickson to Aston Villa helped to fund Queens' purchase of Palmerston Park in 1921 for £1,500. Dickson was replaced at Queens by Hughie Gallacher.

== Aston Villa ==
In his first season at Aston Villa, Dickson scored two goals from his eight appearances. It was, however, in the 1921/22 season that Villa Park saw the best of him when he scored 28 goals from his 42 appearances, making him Villa's top scorer that season and helping the team to finish 5th in England's top division. He played for the Anglo-Scots that season in the trial at Cathkin Park ahead of the England v Scotland international. However, the incumbent Scotland centre forward was selected to retain his place in the team against England.

Dickson's 31 goals from 76 league games and 8 goals from 7 cup matches give him a total return of 83 games scoring 39 goals.

Ian Dickson Aston Villa appearances and goals by season.

#	Season	Appearances	Goals
1	1920/21	8	2
2	1921/22	42	28
3	1922/23	31	7
4	1923/24	2	1

== Middlesbrough ==
Andy Wilson transferred from Middlesbrough to Chelsea in November 1923. £3,000 of the transfer fee Boro received was spent signing Dickson from Aston Villa for Middlesbrough in December 1923. Before the end of that season, Dickson had scored five league goals. Despite joining halfway through that season, this was only three league goals less than the club's top goalscorer for that season. Andy Wilson ironically finished the season as top scorer at both club's who were also relegated that season.

In season 1924/25, Dickson finished as joint-top goalscorer at Middlesbrough with seven goals, alongside Owen Williams. After being troubled by injuries Boro released Dickson on a free on 1 May 1926. Aged 23 this was the end of his career in senior football.

Decades later, Bernie Slaven joined Dickson as a player to represent Middlesbrough after playing for the Dumfries club.
