= Edward Hanlon Jr. =

United States Marine Corps general

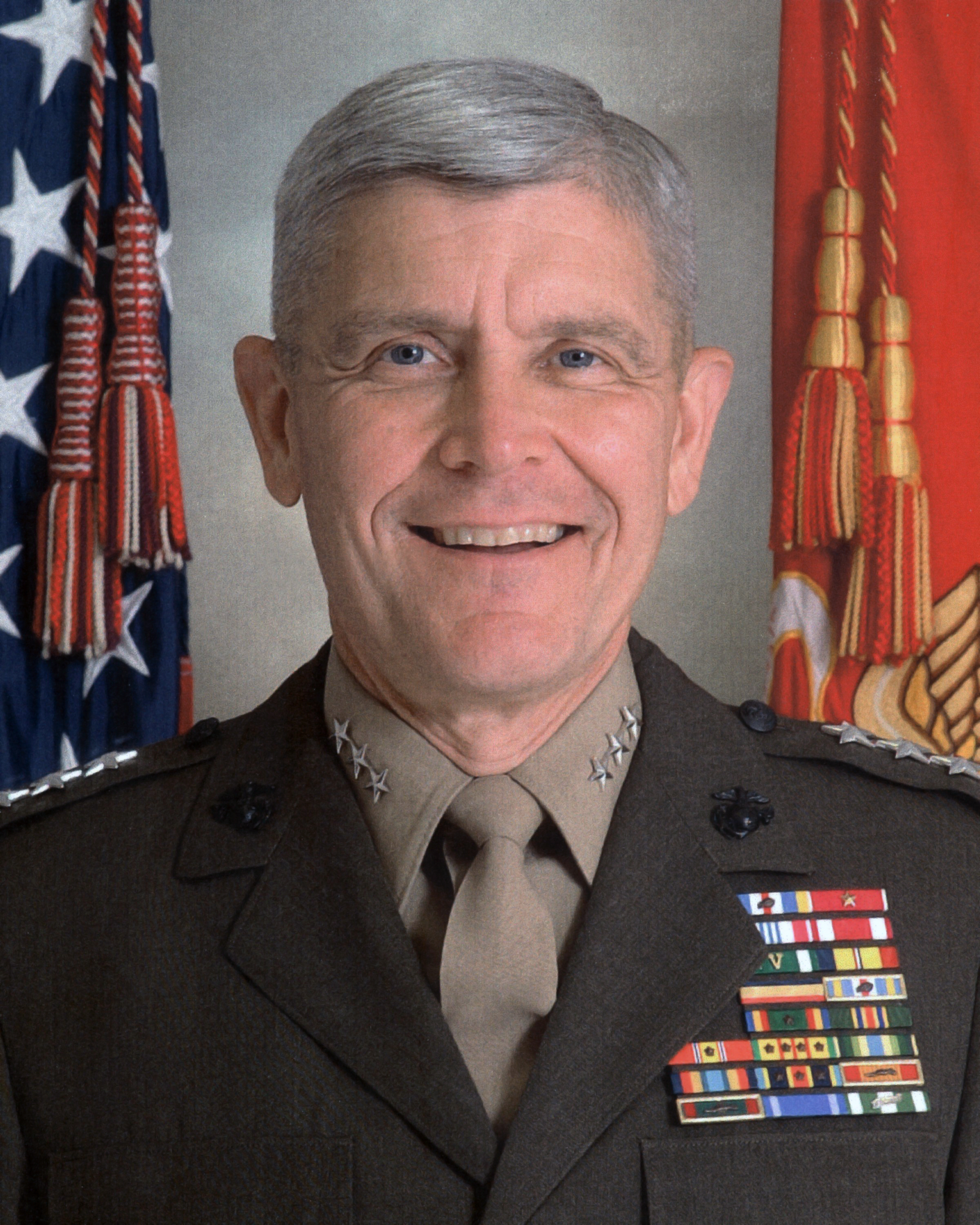
- Official portrait, 2002
- Born: 1944 (age 81–82)
- Allegiance: United States of America
- Branch: United States Marine Corps
- Service years: 1967–2007
- Rank: Lieutenant general
- Commands: 10th Marine Regiment
- Conflicts: Vietnam War
- Awards: Legion of Merit

Edward Hanlon Jr. (born 1944) is a retired United States Marine Corps lieutenant general who served as the U.S. Military Representative to the North Atlantic Treaty Organization (NATO) Military Committee and as Commanding General of the Marine Corps Combat Development Command.

His awards include the Defense Superior Service Medal with oak leaf, Legion of Merit with two gold stars, Defense Meritorious Service Medal, Meritorious Service Medal, Navy and Marine Corps Commendation Medal with Combat "V" and gold star, and the Combat Action Ribbon.
