= Daniel Cassidy (footballer) =

English footballer (1907–1995

Personal information
- Full name: Daniel Cassidy
- Date of birth: 15 June 1907
- Place of birth: Heworth, County Durham, England
- Date of death: 1995 (aged 88)
- Place of death: Gateshead, Tyne and Wear, England
- Height: 5 ft 8 in (1.73 m)
- Positions: Right half; forward

Senior career*
Years	Team	Apps	(Gls)
–	Hebburn		
1926–1927	Southampton	0	(0)
1927–1937	Darlington	165	(15)
- * Club domestic league appearances and goals

Daniel Cassidy (15 June 1907 – 1995) was an English footballer who scored 15 goals from 165 appearances in the Football League playing for Darlington. He played at right half or on the right side of the forward line. He was also on the books of Southampton without representing that club in the league.

Cassidy scored the winning goal in the 1934 Football League Third Division North Cup Final as Darlington came back from a two-goal deficit to beat Stockport County 4–3 at Old Trafford, Manchester. According to the Manchester Guardian's report,

A succession of corner-kicks was gained by Darlington, and from one of these Best headed another equalising goal. Then, when the referee had his watch in his hand, Cassidy dribbled through the Stockport defence, and he had no sooner shot the ball into the net than the whistle sounded for the finish of the match.

His father, also named Daniel Cassidy, was a shipyard labourer born in Derry, Ireland.
