= Robert Simpson (writer) =

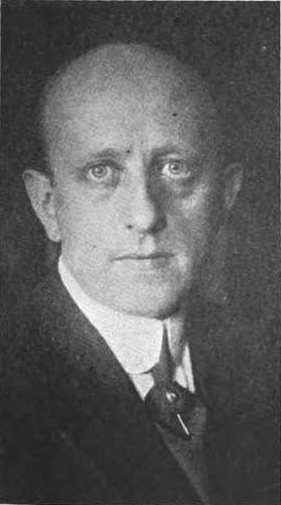
- Born: 1886; Strathy, Scotland
- Died: January 7, 1934 (aged 47–48); New York (state)
- Occupations: Writer and editor
- Spouse: Marie A. Simpson (nee Socin)
- Children: 3

Robert Simpson (1886 - January 7, 1934) was a writer and editor.

== Early life ==
In 1886, Simpson was born in Strathy, Scotland. Simpson's father was Robert Simpson and his mother was Mary Ann Smith Simpson.

== Career ==
In about 1905, Simpson started working in the palm-oil business, trading with West Africa.

In 1907, Simpson immigrated to the United States. In 1916, Simpson became an editor at the Frank A. Munsey Company. In 1917, Simpson was promoted to managing editor of The Argosy, and stayed in that role for three years. He left in 1920 to become a free-lance writer, and returned to editing in 1925, becoming the editor of Mystery Magazine.

Simpson's novels include The Bite of Benin, Swamp Breath, The Grey Charteris, Eight Panes of Glass, and Calvert of Allobar.

== Personal life ==
Simpson was married to Marie A. Simpson, née Socin, and they had a daughter and two sons.
