= David Crosson =

English footballer

Personal information
- Full name: David Crosson
- Date of birth: 24 November 1952 (age 73)
- Place of birth: Bishop Auckland, England
- Height: 5 ft 9 in (1.75 m)
- Position: Right back

Youth career
- –: Newcastle United

Senior career*
Years	Team	Apps	(Gls)
1973–1975	Newcastle United	6	(0)
1975–1980	Darlington	128	(2)
–	Crook Town		
- * Club domestic league appearances and goals

David Crosson (born 24 November 1952) is an English former footballer who made 134 appearances in the Football League playing as a right back for Newcastle United and Darlington in the 1970s.

Crosson was born in Bishop Auckland, County Durham, and began his football career as a junior with Newcastle United. He made his first-team debut in the Texaco Cup in October 1973, and had a run of games in the First Division towards the end of the 1973–74 season. He was unable to dislodge long-time incumbent right-back David Craig, and in 1975 moved on to Fourth Division club Darlington on a free transfer. He played 128 league matches over the next five seasons, scoring twice, before moving into non-league football with Crook Town. Crosson then moved to Tasmania where he played for Rapid and the Tasmania representative side and later went into coaching.
