= Tommy Greaves =

English footballer

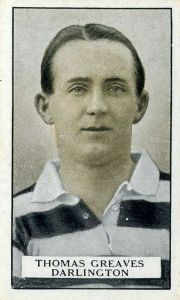
- Pictured in 1926

Personal information
- Full name: Thomas Greaves
- Date of birth: 26 March 1892
- Place of birth: Springwell Colliery, England
- Height: 5 ft 10 in (1.78 m)
- Position: Right back

Senior career*
Years	Team	Apps	(Gls)
–	Hylton Colliery		
1911–1920	Bury	66	(0)
1921–1928	Darlington	227	(1)
- * Club domestic league appearances and goals

Thomas Greaves (26 March 1892 – after 1927) was an English footballer who made 293 appearances in the Football League playing as a right back for Bury and Darlington in the 1910s and 1920s.

== Life and career ==
Greaves was born at Springwell Colliery, County Durham. He began his football career with Hylton Colliery before joining Football League First Division club Bury. He made a successful first appearance at right back as one of four debutants in a goalless draw with Preston North End on 16 September 1911, described in the Manchester Guardian report as "always effective". He kept his place: in October, in a one-goal defeat to Manchester United, he was, again according to the Guardian, "easily the best of a moderate pair of backs".

Bury were relegated to the Second Division at the end of Greaves's first season. As a Second Division team, they lost to Southern League club Crystal Palace 2–0 in the 1912–13 FA Cup. The Daily Mirror wrote that "a feature of the match was the splendid combination of the Palace halves and forwards, who, but for the great play of Greaves at back for Bury, would probably have run up a much bigger score." Even he could not cope with Palace's Davis for the first goal; another player "made an abortive attempt to stop him, and then Greaves hung on like a leech. Greaves, who is head and shoulders taller than Davis, made every effort to check the young forward, getting both in front and behind him; and even roughing-it with his slim opponent. But Davis beat him". His physical style of play was noted in September 1913, in a match against Fulham. The Daily Express correspondent thought "Greaves would do well to relinquish some of his methods of tackling. They savour more of the Rugby code, and it was one of these that maybe cost his side a point" when he conceded a penalty.

During the First World War, Greaves appeared for Bury in the regional competitions, but when the Football League resumed afterwards, he "broke down in the opening match of the season", and was thereafter "persistently dogged by injuries to his limbs". Bury released him, and he returned to the north-east of England, where he was already employed as a schoolteacher in Sunderland, and signed for Darlington, a member of the newly formed Third Division North.

He played in Darlington's first Football League fixture, a 2–0 win at home to Halifax Town on 27 August 1921, and went on to appear in around three-quarters of their matches over the next seven years. From April 1923 to February 1925, they remained unbeaten at home, but Greaves was involuntarily instrumental in the streak coming to an end. Opponents Lincoln City's "all-important point was obtained in rather a remarkable way. Endeavouring to clear a shot Greaves kicked the ball against Marshall and it rebounded off that player into the net." He helped the team gain promotion in 1925, captained the team in the Second Division, and retired from the game in 1928, by which time he was aged 36.
