= Bobby Simpson (footballer, born 1915) =

English footballer

Personal information
- Full name: Robert Simpson
- Date of birth: 15 September 1915
- Place of birth: Bishop Auckland, England
- Date of death: 13 January 1994 (aged 78)
- Place of death: Bishop Auckland, England
- Height: 5 ft 5 in (1.65 m)
- Position: Outside forward

Senior career*
Years	Team	Apps	(Gls)
–	West Auckland Town		
1936–1947	Darlington	96	(14)
1947–1948	Hartlepools United	13	(1)
–	Stockton		
- * Club domestic league appearances and goals

Robert Simpson (15 September 1915 – 13 January 1994) was an English footballer who made 109 appearances in the Football League playing for Darlington and Hartlepools United either side of the Second World War. An outside forward, he also played non-league football for West Auckland Town and Stockton.
