= Jimmy McKinnell (footballer) =

Scottish footballer and manager

Personal information
- Full name: James Templeton Broadfoot McKinnell
- Date of birth: 27 March 1893
- Place of birth: Dalbeattie, Scotland
- Date of death: October 1972 (aged 79)
- Place of death: Brixworth, England
- Height: 5 ft 8 in (1.73 m)
- Position: Left half

Senior career*
Years	Team	Apps	(Gls)
1913–1914	Ayr United		
1914–19??	Nithsdale Wanderers		
19??–1919	Dumfries		
1919–1920	Queen of the South		
1920–1926	Blackburn Rovers	111	(0)
1926–1929	Darlington	101	(1)
1929–1930	Nelson	10	(0)

Managerial career
- 1938–1947: Queen of the South
- * Club domestic league appearances and goals

James Templeton Broadfoot McKinnell (27 March 1893 – October 1972) was a Scottish professional footballer who played as a left half, mainly for Dumfries club Queen of the South, Blackburn Rovers and Darlington.

McKinnell moved from Queens to Rovers at the start of the 1920-21 season. McKinnell was one of three players from the Dumfries club, alongside Willie McCall and Tom Wylie to move to the English Football League around that time. These three transfers combined with Ian Dickson's move to Aston Villa helped fund the Doonhamers purchase of Palmerston Park.

McKinnell played in 111 league matches and 13 FA Cup games in six seasons for the Ewood Park club. McKinnell then signed for Darlington, where he played in 101 league matches and scored one goal in three seasons. McKinnell then signed for Nelson at the start of the 1929-30 season, where he played 10 league matches before retiring at the end of that season.
