= Ernie Devlin =

English footballer

Personal information
- Full name: Ernest Devlin
- Date of birth: 6 March 1920
- Place of birth: Gateshead, England
- Date of death: 1976 (aged 55–56)
- Place of death: Gateshead, England
- Position: Full back

Senior career*
Years	Team	Apps	(Gls)
1941–1946	→ Gateshead (wartime)	113	(1)
1946–1953	West Ham United	70	(0)
1953–1957	Darlington	115	(1)
Total		185	(1)
- * Club domestic league appearances and goals

Ernest Devlin (6 March 1920 – 1976) was an English footballer who made 185 appearances in the Football League playing as a full back for West Ham United and Darlington in the years following the Second World War.

== Football career ==
Devlin was born in Gateshead, County Durham, and began his football career with his hometown club, Gateshead F.C. He played for Gateshead throughout the Second World War, and made 113 appearances in the wartime leagues.

He signed for Second Division club West Ham United on 31 May 1946, ahead of the first postwar Football League season. He made his debut towards the end of that campaign, and played just once in 1947–48, but became a more frequent member of the first eleven over the next couple of years. An injury sustained in a 1–0 defeat of Queens Park Rangers on 4 February 1950 put an early end to his 1949–50 season, and although a regular selection in August and September 1950 he picked up an injury while contributing two own goals to a 5–3 loss at home to Sheffield United, lost his place, and rarely regained it. He played just nine more league matches over the next two and a half years.

Devlin returned to the north-east to sign for Third Division North club Darlington in 1953. He remained with the club for four years, and played 115 league matches. He scored just once, the first goal in a 3–0 home win against Workington on 19 April 1954.
