= Ron Harbertson =

English footballer (1929–2025)

Personal information
- Full name: Ronald Harbertson
- Date of birth: 23 December 1929
- Place of birth: Seghill, England
- Date of death: August 2025 (aged 95)
- Height: 5 ft 10 in (1.78 m)
- Position: Inside forward

Senior career*
Years	Team	Apps	(Gls)
- Astley
- East Chevington
- North Shields
1949–1950	Newcastle United	0	(0)
1950–1951	Bradford City	16	(1)
1951–1952	Brighton & Hove Albion	0	(0)
1952–1954	Bradford City	13	(3)
1954–1955	Grimsby Town	26	(6)
1955–1957	Ashington		
1957–1958	Darlington	49	(21)
1958–1960	Lincoln City	57	(22)
1960–1961	Wrexham	28	(14)
1961	Darlington	14	(2)
1961–1962	Lincoln City	29	(3)
- Grantham
Total		232+	(71+)
- * Club domestic league appearances and goals

Ronald Harbertson (23 December 1929 – August 2025) was an English professional footballer who played as an inside forward.

== Career ==
Born in Seghill, Northumberland, Harbertson played for Astley, East Chevington, North Shields, Newcastle United, Bradford City, Brighton & Hove Albion, Grimsby Town, Ashington, Darlington, Lincoln City, Wrexham and Grantham.

== Death ==
Harbertson died in August 2025, at the age of 95.
