= Phil Owers =

English footballer

Personal information
- Full name: Philip Owers
- Date of birth: 28 April 1955 (age 71)
- Place of birth: Bishop Auckland, England
- Height: 5 ft 11 in (1.80 m)
- Position: Goalkeeper

Senior career*
| Years | Team | Apps | (Gls) |
| 1971–1972 | Shildon | | |
| 1972–1975 | Darlington | 45 | (0) |
| 1975–1976 | Gillingham | 2 | (0) |
| 1976–1980 | Darlington | 69 | (0) |
| 1980 | Crook Town | 21 | (0) |
| – | Bishop Auckland | | |
| – | Brandon United | | |
| 1987 | Hartlepool United | 2 | (0) |

Managerial career
- 2007–2008: West Auckland Town
- * Club domestic league appearances and goals

Philip Owers (born 28 April 1955) is an English former footballer who made 118 appearances in the Football League playing as a goalkeeper for Darlington (in two spells), Gillingham and Hartlepool United in the 1970s and 1980s. He also played non-league football for clubs including Shildon, Crook Town, Bishop Auckland, Brandon United, Spennymoor United and West Auckland Town.

== Life and career ==
Owers was born in Bishop Auckland, County Durham. He began his football career with Shildon, making his senior debut as a 15-year-old, before signing for Fourth Division club Darlington. While still an A-level student, Owers made his first appearance in the Football League, on 6 January 1973; Darlington conceded seven goals to Southport, though no more than one was attributable to the goalkeeper. The Northern Echo reported that "he was in no way to blame for the disgraceful shambles, but looked close to tears as he was applauded down the tunnel". A few weeks later, Owers was interviewed by David Frost for an edition of The Frost Programme focussing on Darlington F.C. as an illustration of the unglamorous side of football, described 40 years later by the Echo as "an insight into a town's heart-aching relationship with its football club, and a reminder of the ridiculous resilience of optimism". Described by Frost as "17 and nursing a dream", Owers said he "want[ed] to get Darlington out of trouble and ... would like to play at Wembley for a big club."

Over the next two and a half seasons, he made 45 league appearances before signing for Third Division club Gillingham on a free transfer; he played only twice before returning to Darlington. After 69 more matches in Division Four over a four-year period, Owers moved back into non-league football with Crook Town and then with Bishop Auckland. The Northern League was equally unglamorous – charges were brought against two men for attacking Owers during a match in 1982 – though he was a member of Bishop's league-winning team in 1984–85. After a spell with Brandon United, he played four matches on a non-contract basis for Fourth Division Hartlepool United in August 1987, before a further spell with Bishop Auckland and a stint with Spennymoor United.

By 1993 he was back at Shildon as a player, and left it as assistant manager in 1999. Back again by April 2003, he was reported to have played for the club in four different decades. Later that year, he was on the bench as Shildon reached the first round proper of the 2003–04 FA Cup, in which they lost 7–2 to Division Two club Notts County.

Owers continued to play into his fifties. He won the Durham Alliance League title with Shildon Railway in 2004–05, and appeared in the Northern League while manager of West Auckland Town in April 2008 at the age of 52.
