= George Stevens (Scottish footballer) =

Scottish footballer

Personal information
- Full name: George Stevens
- Date of birth: 24 February 1891
- Place of birth: Dundee, Scotland
- Height: 5 ft 7 in (1.70 m)
- Positions: Inside left; outside left

Senior career*
Years	Team	Apps	(Gls)
19??–1926	Darlington	130	(38)
1926–1927	Crewe Alexandra	6	(0)
Total		136	(38)
- * Club domestic league appearances and goals

George Stevens (24 February 1891 – after 1926) was a Scottish footballer who scored 38 goals from 136 appearances in the English Football League playing as a left-sided forward for Darlington and Crewe Alexandra.

== Life and career ==
Stevens was born in Dundee, Scotland, and by 1920, he was playing football for English North Eastern League club Darlington. He scored their second goal as they eliminated Football League First Division club Sheffield Wednesday from the 1919–20 FA Cup in front of a Monday-afternoon crowd of 52,388. The following season, he contributed to Darlington's winning the North Eastern League title, thus ensuring their inclusion in the newly formed Northern Section of the Third Division. Stevens helped Darlington to second place in their first season in the Football League, and went one better three years later, when they gained promotion to the Second Division as champions.

Together with teammate Davie Brown, Stevens was released on a free transfer at the end of the 1925–26 season, and returned to the Third Division with Crewe Alexandra. The Daily Express thought their inclusion "should considerably strengthen the attack". Brown scored heavily for Crewe, but Stevens played only rarely, and finished his league career at the end of that season.
