= Billy Robinson (English footballer) =

English footballer

Personal information
- Full name: William Robinson
- Date of birth: 24 August 1903
- Place of birth: Darlington, England
- Date of death: 1973
- Height: 5 ft 8 in (1.73 m)
- Position: Centre half

Senior career*
| Years | Team | Apps | (Gls) |
- Croft
| 1921–1927 | Darlington | 143 | (0) |
| 1927–1928 | Southend United | 4 | (0) |
| 1928 | Torquay United | 0 | (0) |
| 1928–1929 | Carlisle United | 4 | (1) |
- * Club domestic league appearances and goals

William Robinson (24 August 1903 – 1973) was an English footballer who made 151 appearances in the Football League playing as a centre half for Darlington, Southend United and Carlisle United in the 1920s. He was also on the books of Torquay United, but without representing that club in league competition.

Robinson spent six seasons with home-town club Darlington, and contributed to their promotion to the Second Division in 1925. In the club's second season at that level, he lost his place to Jimmy Waugh, the club's then record signing. When Robinson moved on to Southend United at the end of the season, after Darlington had been relegated back to the Third Division North, the Daily Express reported that he "was thought to be unlucky to lose his place in the 'Quakers' side when Waugh was signed from Sheffield United and yet failed to save Darlington from relegation." He played little senior football after leaving Darlington.

In August 1932, he returned to the club as assistant trainer.
