= Ron Greener =

English footballer

Personal information
- Full name: Ronald Greener
- Date of birth: 31 January 1934
- Place of birth: Easington, County Durham, England
- Date of death: 19 October 2015 (aged 81)
- Place of death: Darlington, England
- Height: 5 ft 11 in (1.80 m)
- Position: Centre half

Youth career
- –: Barnsley

Senior career*
Years	Team	Apps	(Gls)
19??–1952	Easington CW		
1952–1955	Newcastle United	3	(0)
1955–1967	Darlington	442	(5)
1967–1969	Stockton		
- * Club domestic league appearances and goals

Ronald Greener (31 January 1934 – 19 October 2015) was an English footballer, who played as a centre half. Born in Easington, County Durham, he played his entire career in his native North-East. He started his career with Newcastle United, before he moved to Darlington in 1955. He spent most of his playing career with Darlington, and set the club's appearance record of 490 first-team appearances.

== Football career ==
Greener worked as a blacksmith at Easington Colliery, and began his football career playing for Easington Colliery Welfare and for Barnsley at youth level, before joining Newcastle United as a professional in 1952. He made his first-team debut on 3 October 1953, in a 2–0 home defeat against Charlton Athletic in the First Division. He played only twice more for Newcastle before signing for Darlington in 1955. He immediately established himself in the first team, playing 132 consecutive games, a run which came to an end in February 1958 when he was snowbound at home, unable to join up with the team travelling to Workington. The run included the "thrashing" of Chelsea, Football League champions only three years earlier, in the Fourth Round of the 1957–58 FA Cup. After letting slip a three-goal lead at Stamford Bridge, Darlington won the replay 4–1 after extra time. His performances earned him selection for the Third Division North representative side to play against the South in April 1957.

He missed most of the club's first season in the newly formed Fourth Division after breaking his leg in August 1958, but returned the following season to play regularly for the remainder of his Darlington career. He was part of the squad which won promotion to the Third Division in 1965–66 under manager Lol Morgan, and a regular first-team player the following season under Jimmy Greenhalgh, but was released on a free transfer at the end of the 1966–67 season. Nicknamed "The Man Mountain", Greener had made 490 first-team appearances for Darlington, still, as of 2010, a club record, his final appearance coming in April 1967 against Bristol Rovers at Feethams. He finished his football career with two years at Stockton.

In 2004, the club named a conference room at their Darlington Arena stadium in Greener's honour, and after the Feethams ground was demolished for housing, a road on the development was named after him.

Greener died in Darlington on 19 October 2015 at the age of 81.

== Honours ==
=== As a player ===
Darlington

- Division Four runner-up: 1965–66
