= Mike Jackson (footballer, born 1939) =

Scottish footballer and manager

Personal information
- Date of birth: 25 August 1939 (age 87)
- Place of birth: Glasgow, Scotland
- Position: Inside forward

Youth career
- 1955–1957: Benburb

Senior career*
Years	Team	Apps	(Gls)
1957–1963	Celtic	57	(23)
1962–1964	St Johnstone	24	(2)
1963–1965	Third Lanark	43	(8)
1966–1967	Drumcondra	?	(?)
1966–1967	Clyde	3	(2)
1967–1970	Queen of the South	94	(22)
1970–1971	Clydebank	12	(0)
Total		233	(57)
- * Club domestic league appearances and goals

Mike Jackson (born 25 August 1939) is a Scottish former professional footballer and manager. Jackson played as an inside forward for Benburb, Celtic, St Johnstone, Third Lanark, Clyde, Queen of the South and Clydebank in Scotland and Drumcondra in Ireland. Jackson had two spells as the manager of the Doonhamers, (1975–78) and (1986–87), the club in Dumfries where he played for the longest time during his career.

== Celtic ==
Mike Jackson signed for Celtic at the start of season 1957-58 having previously played for Scottish Junior club Benburb. Jackson was at Celtic until the summer of 1963, having scored 23 goals in 57 league appearances. Jackson however did not establish himself as a first-team regular and departed Celtic Park during the 1962-63 season.

== St Johnstone & Third Lanark ==
Jackson then signed for St Johnstone, playing in 24 league matches and scoring two goals, before signing for Third Lanark. Jackson played in 43 league matches for the Hi Hi and scored 8 goals for the Cathkin Park club.

== Drumcondra and Clyde ==
Jackson then had a brief spell in Ireland with Drumcondra from the north of Dublin before he signed for Clyde that same season. Jackson played in three league games for the Bully Wee and scored two goals season played for Clyde in which he scored twice in his three league games before leaving at the end of the 1966-67 season.

== Queen of the South ==
Jackson then signed at the start of the 1967-68 season for Dumfries club, Queen of the South. Jackson stayed in South West Scotland for three seasons at Palmerston Park and played alongside players such as goalkeeper Allan Ball, Billy Collings, Jocky Dempster, Lex Law and Iain McChesney. Jackson played in 94 league matches and scored 22 goals for the Doonhamers and departed Queens alongside Collings at the end of the 1969-70 season, with the club finishing in third place in the Second Division and missing out on promotion to the First Division behind Falkirk and Cowdenbeath.

== Clydebank and Benburb ==
Jackson then signed for Clydebank for the 1970-71, where he played 12 league games without scoring any goals. Jackson then returned to Benburb where his career had started to then finish his playing career with the Bens.

== Management ==
Jackson was the manager of Queen of the South on two occasions. Jackson's first spell (1975–78) had him in-charge of former team-mates Allan Ball, Crawford Boyd, Nobby Clark, Jocky Dempster and Iain McChesney. In a Scottish League Cup quarter final versus Rangers, the Ibrox club required extra-time to eliminate the Doonhamers. Jackson on two occasions led Queens to the Scottish Cup quarter finals before the club was eliminated by both of the Old Firm.

Jackson's second spell as the Doonhamers manager (1986–87) had players such as left winger Jimmy Robertson, utility player George Cloy and goalkeeper Alan Davidson playing under his tutelage.
