= Peter Dickson (footballer) =

Scottish footballer

Personal information
- Date of birth: 22 October 1951 (age 75)
- Position: Forward

Senior career*
Years	Team	Apps	(Gls)
1969–1975	Albion Rovers	121	(42)
1975–1982	Queen of the South	191	(40)
1982	Green Gully	8	(3)
1983	Albion Rovers	13	(4)
Total		333	(89)

International career
1976	Scottish League XI	1	(0)
1976	Scotland U23	1	(0)
- * Club domestic league appearances and goals

Peter Dickson (born 22 October 1950) is a Scottish former professional footballer. He played for Parkhead, Albion Rovers and Queen of the South. He started his career as a striker but later played at right back.

Dickson played for Coatbridge club Albion Rovers where he was divisional top scorer in 1974/75. Dickson then joined Dumfries club Queen of the South on 23 November 1975 and went to make 231 appearances scoring 51 goals. Teammates Allan Ball, Iain McChesney, Jocky Dempster and Nobby Clark have all since been interviewed by the club and remembered Dickson for his contribution in the 1975–76 Scottish Cup 5-4 extra time win against Ayr United. George Cloy and Jimmy Robertson have similarly been interviewed and remembered Dickson for his off field antics.

When Dickson left Palmerston he went to play for Melbourne-based Australian clubs Green Gully and Albion Rovers.
