= Jim Donald (footballer) =

Scottish footballer

Jim Donald is a Scottish former professional association footballer best known for his time with Queen of the South.

== Football career ==
Jim Donald signed for Dumfries club Queen of the South in February 1970 from Renfrew Juniors. Donald made his debut at 19 years of age. He started as a winger but after a couple of seasons moved to midfield. Donald was a tireless worker. His career at Queens included 174 league games in which he scored 18 goals. Donald was part of the Queen of the South side of the mid 1970s that would have been promoted to the top tier of Scottish football had it not been for league reconstruction at the end of the 1974/75 season. Among his teams mates then were Allan Ball, Ian McChesney, Nobby Clark, Crawford Boyd and Jocky Dempster. Donald and his teammates also enjoyed consecutive runs to the quarter-finals of the Scottish Cup before being knocked out by Old Firm opposition. In the Scottish League Cup Queens again made it to the quarter-finals when a 2-1 victory over Rangers took the tie into extra time. Another goal for Rangers took the Glasgow club through.

After leaving Queen of the South Donald played 33 league games for Alloa Athletic in which he scored 1 goal. He then moved to Brechin City where he scored twice during his 34 league appearances. After playing in one league game for Montrose F.C. he next moved to Arbroath F.C. for whom he played in two league games before moving to the junior ranks with Rutherglen Glencairn.

== Personal life and retirement ==
Donald was best man at the wedding of Kenny Dalglish. This led to an appearance on This is Your Life when Dalglish was spotlighted on the TV program.

Donald took up the sport of lawn bowls, joining Yoker Bowling Club in 2014. In 2015, he won the fours (rinks) and in 2016 was an integral part on the Senior Fours team that made it to Northfield, Ayr to compete in the Scottish Finals. In the same year he retained the fours (rinks) won the previous year.
