= Maitland Pollock =

Scottish footballer

Personal information
- Full name: Maitland Alexander Inglis Pollock
- Date of birth: 31 October 1952 (age 74)
- Place of birth: Dumfries, Scotland
- Height: 5 ft 8 in (1.73 m)
- Position: Winger

Senior career*
Years	Team	Apps	(Gls)
1970–1973	Nottingham Forest	0	(0)
1973–197?	Walsall	2	(0)
- Burton Albion
1974–1976	Luton Town	6	(0)
1976–1978	Portsmouth	54	(10)
1978–1979	Queen of the South	23	(1)
Total		85+	(11+)
- * Club domestic league appearances and goals

Maitland Alexander Inglis Pollock (born 31 October 1952) is a Scottish former professional footballer. He was born in Dumfries and grew up in Lochmaben.

Pollock was a winger who after serving as an apprentice started his senior career with Nottingham Forest in the era in the likes of Neil Martin. However, he never played a senior league game for Forest in the three years he had at the City Ground as a pro.

He next was at Walsall in season 1973–74 where he played in two league games before going to non league Burton Albion. He then joined Luton Town where in 1974–75 he played six first team league games with the club in the second tier of English league football.

His next club was Portsmouth, a division below Luton where in two seasons he played 54 league games scoring 10 goals.

His last club in senior football was the team from the town of his birth, Queen of the South in Dumfries in the era of Allan Ball, Iain McChesney, Jocky Dempster, Crawford Boyd and Nobby Clark. In season 1978–79 Pollock played 23 league games for the Palmerston Park men scoring one goal. His career in football ended at the age of 26.
