= Graeme Robertson (Scottish footballer) =

Scottish footballer

Personal information
- Full name: Graeme Robertson
- Date of birth: 4 June 1962 (age 64)
- Place of birth: Dumfries, Scotland
- Position: Right-back

Youth career
- 1974–1978: Lochar Thistle

Senior career*
| Years | Team | Apps | (Gls) |
| 1978–1987 | Queen of the South | 237 | (21) |
| 1987–1990 | Dunfermline Athletic | 63 | (3) |
| 1990–1992 | Partick Thistle | 71 | (0) |
| 1992–1994 | Ayr United | 65 | (1) |
| 1999–2000 | Albion Rovers | 6 | (0) |
| Total | | 442 | (25) |
- * Club domestic league appearances and goals as of June 2000

Graeme Robertson (born 4 June 1962 in Dumfries) is a Scottish former professional footballer who played for home-town club Queen of the South, Dunfermline Athletic, Partick Thistle, Ayr United and Albion Rovers.

== Career ==
Robertson started in football with Lochar Thistle in the Dumfries Amateur Leagues before signing for Queen of the South at 16 years old and stayed at the club for 11 seasons, where he was club captain for a spell. Robertson's played alongside the likes of Ted McMinn, Jimmy Robertson and Nobby Clark at Palmerston Park, all of whom recognised the club captain's contributions when the former players were later interviewed by the club. Robertson's time in Dumfries included 237 league appearances.

Graeme Robertson left Queens in 1987 to join Dunfermline Athletic where he played in the top division of Scottish football. Robertson then had a couple of seasons with both Partick Thistle and Ayr United, before retiring as a player, although Robertson did briefly come out of retirement in season 1999–2000 to play for Albion Rovers in six league matches.

Robertson has remained involved in football in a number of coaching roles, that include Raith Rovers and Livingston.

After a period in Scotland, Robertson moved to Shenzhen, China, as part of the Manchester City Football Services scheme, to develop football in the Far East.

In November 2016, Robertson returned from China for one month, to home-town club Queen of the South, to assist with coaching duties alongside caretaker manager Jim Thomson, after the departure of manager Gavin Skelton.

Robertson is stepfather to Jason Cummings, who plays for Hibernian.
