= Tommy O'Hara =

Scottish footballer

Personal information
- Full name: Thomas O'Hara
- Date of birth: 17 August 1952
- Place of birth: Bellshill, Scotland
- Date of death: 27 January 2016 (aged 63)
- Place of death: Kingskettle, Scotland
- Position: Midfielder

Youth career
- St Columba's Boys Guild
- Kirkintilloch Rob Roy

Senior career*
Years	Team	Apps	(Gls)
1971–1974	Celtic	0	(0)
1974–1978	Queen of the South	137	(9)
1978–1980	Washington Diplomats	89	(1)
1981	Jacksonville Tea Men	31	(0)
1982–1983	Motherwell	53	(0)
1983–1984	Falkirk	36	(3)
1984–1985	Partick Thistle	17	(0)
- Lesmahagow
Total		363	(13)

International career
1982	United States	1	(0)
- * Club domestic league appearances and goals

Thomas O'Hara (17 August 1952 – 27 January 2016) was a professional footballer who played as a midfielder. Active in Scotland and the United States, O'Hara made over 350 career league appearances. He also earned one international cap with the US national soccer team in 1982.

== Early career ==
Born in Bellshill and raised in nearby Viewpark, in 1971 O'Hara moved to Celtic from Kirkintilloch Rob Roy (where he had been selected for Scotland at Junior level); however, like his elder brother Pat who had also been on the books at Celtic Park, he failed to progress from the reserves to play in any competitive senior matches in a period when the team was among the strongest in Europe.

== Queen of the South ==
In 1974 O'Hara joined Queen of the South, the club to whom he gave his longest service. In subsequent interviews for the club, he was listed amongst the best players of that time by Allan Ball, Iain McChesney, Crawford Boyd and Jocky Dempster. O'Hara played in one of the more successful sides in the Willie Harkness era at Queens; they enjoyed some notable cup results as well as finishing runners-up in 1974–75 Scottish Division Two, being deprived of promotion to Scotland's top flight only by league reconstruction which meant only the winners of the lower tier moved up.

== NASL ==
In March 1978, O'Hara moved to the United States where he signed with Washington Diplomats of the North American Soccer League. He spent three seasons with the club and amongst his teammates was Johan Cruyff.

Financial difficulties led the team to sell his contract in December 1980 to the Jacksonville Tea Men. He played one season in Jacksonville, then returned to Scotland.

== Return to Scotland ==
O'Hara then played for Motherwell, Falkirk and Partick Thistle in the Scottish Football League. He later worked as a publican in Lanarkshire and Fife, having joined the industry while still playing football at a high level.

== Death ==
Queen of the South, the club to whom O'Hara gave his longest service, were informed of his untimely death on 28 January 2016.

== See also ==
- List of United States men's international soccer players born outside the United States
