= Willie Hunter (footballer, born 1940) =

Scottish footballer (1940–2020)

Personal information
- Full name: William Hunter
- Date of birth: 14 February 1940
- Place of birth: Edinburgh, Scotland
- Date of death: 4 August 2020 (aged 80)
- Position: Inside forward

Youth career
- Edinburgh Norton

Senior career*
Years	Team	Apps	(Gls)
1957–1967	Motherwell	228	(43)
1967–1968	Detroit Cougars	23	(4)
1967	→ Glentoran (loan)	0	(0)
1968–1971	Hibernian	12	(1)
1971	Hellenic	21	(2)
1972–1975	Cape Town City		

International career
1958–1960	Scottish League XI	4	(0)
1959–1962	Scotland U23	4	(1)
1960	Scotland	3	(1)
1960	SFA trial v SFL	1	(0)
1961	SFL trial v SFA	1	(0)

Managerial career
- 1978–1979: Queen of the South
- 1979–1981: Inverness Caledonian
- * Club domestic league appearances and goals

William Hunter (14 February 1940 – 4 August 2020) was a Scottish football player and manager. Hunter spent most of his playing career with Motherwell, although he also played for Detroit Cougars, Hibernian, Hellenic and Cape Town City. Hunter also represented both Scotland and the Scottish League. After retiring as a player, Hunter was manager at Queen of the South and Inverness Caledonian.

== Club career ==
Hunter joined Motherwell from Edinburgh Norton in 1957 with Motherwell then managed by Bobby Ancell. Hunter became part of the side that became known as the 'Ancell Babes'. Although usually played as an inside left, he also played occasionally as a winger, and was compared favourably to Gordon Smith for his performance in that role. His progression stalled after he suffered two broken arms and a broken leg within the space of a few years.

In May 1967, the Detroit Cougars paid £14,000 for his transfer and Hunter moved to the new American professional league, the NASL. His new side survived for only one year however and at the end of the 1968 NASL season, he returned to Scotland to join Hibernian. Hunter was a substitute as his new team lost the 1968–69 Scottish League Cup Final to Celtic, and he played for the Edinburgh team until 1971.

== International career ==
Hunter earned three caps for the Scotland national team while with Motherwell, all in 1960. He scored his only Scotland goal in his first cap in a 3–3 draw with Hungary. He also played in defeats to Turkey and Wales.

== Managerial career ==
After four years playing in South Africa, Hunter became assistant manager of Portsmouth, a role he held for three years. Hunter worked for his former Motherwell team-mate Ian St. John at Portsmouth.

He earned the opportunity to manage in his own right at Queen of the South in 1978, working with players such as Allan Ball, Iain McChesney, Nobby Clark, Crawford Boyd and Jocky Dempster. Hunter left the Dumfries club after only four months. His last involvement in football was as Inverness Caledonian's manager from 1979 to 1981.

Hunter died in August 2020, aged 80.
