= Drew Busby =

Scottish footballer (1947–2022)

Personal information
- Full name: Andrew Douglass Busby
- Date of birth: 8 December 1947
- Place of birth: Glasgow, Scotland
- Date of death: 1 July 2022 (aged 74)
- Place of death: Alexandria, Dunbartonshire, Scotland
- Positions: Midfielder; forward

Youth career
- Dumbarton United

Senior career*
Years	Team	Apps	(Gls)
1966–1967	Third Lanark	11	(5)
1967	Partick Thistle	1	(0)
1967–1970	Vale of Leven	?	(?)
1970–1973	Airdrieonians	93	(43)
1973–1979	Heart of Midlothian	178	(55)
1979–1980	Toronto Blizzard	51	(8)
1980–1982	Morton	51	(5)
1982–1984	Queen of the South	45	(11)
Total		440	(131)

Managerial career
- 1982–1984: Queen of the South
- * Club domestic league appearances and goals

Andrew Douglass Busby (8 December 1947 – 1 July 2022) was a Scottish footballer who played for Third Lanark, Airdrieonians, Hearts, Toronto Blizzard and Morton. Busby also served Queen of the South as their player-manager.

== Career ==
Busby started his senior career at Third Lanark, but the club went out of business in 1967 at the end of his first season. Drew scored Thirds' last goal in a 5–1 defeat at Boghead against Dumbarton on 28 April. Without a club, he dropped down to Junior level for three seasons, playing for his local side Vale of Leven.

Busby returned to the senior game in 1970 with Airdrieonians. Known for his robust style of play, he formed a formidable attacking partnership with Drew Jarvie and scored 43 goals in 93 league games. With Airdrie facing relegation in 1973, Hearts manager Bobby Seith stepped in to sign Busby for a fee of £35,000. In six seasons at Tynecastle, Busby scored 84 goals in all competitions, played in the 1976 Scottish Cup Final and was popular with the Hearts support. Relegation for the second time in three seasons however forced the club to cut costs and Busby was released at the end of the 1978–79 campaign.

Following two seasons in the NASL with the nascent Toronto Blizzard, Busby returned to Scotland and joined Morton (scoring on his league debut for the Greenock club) before becoming player-manager of Dumfries club Queen of the South in 1982. After two seasons with little success, Busby retired in 1984. Former players, Ted McMinn, Jimmy Robertson and George Cloy have all subsequently been interviewed by the club and spoken well of Busby. Crawford Boyd cited a difference of opinion with Busby as being behind his own departure from Queens.

== Personal life and death ==
After retiring from football in 1984, Busby was the landlord of the Waverley Bar in Dumbarton. He published his autobiography in July 2013, titled The Drew Busby Story. In May 2014, Busby was inducted into the Airdrieonians Hall of Fame; two years later, he was a nominee for the club's greatest XI. He was also inducted into the Heart of Midlothian Hall of Fame in 2018.

Busby died at his home in Alexandria on 1 July 2022, at the age of 74 from Hodgkin lymphoma.
