= Jackie Husband =

Scottish footballer and manager

Personal information
- Full name: John Husband
- Date of birth: 28 May 1918
- Place of birth: Dunfermline, Scotland
- Date of death: 29 April 1992 (aged 73)
- Place of death: Renfrew, Scotland
- Height: 5 ft 9 in (1.75 m)
- Position: Centre half

Senior career*
Years	Team	Apps	(Gls)
- Yoker Athletic
1938–1950	Partick Thistle	371	(12)

International career
1946	Scotland (wartime)	1	(0)
1946	Scotland	2	(0)
1946	Scotland (unofficial)	1	(0)
1947	Scottish Football League XI	1	(0)

Managerial career
- 1967–1968: Queen of the South
- * Club domestic league appearances and goals

John Husband (28 May 1918 – 29 April 1992) was a Scottish professional football player and manager. Husband spent the majority of his club career at Partick Thistle, where he made almost 400 appearances in all competitions, and was also capped twice by Scotland. Husband also spent a short time as manager of Queen of the South.

== Playing career ==
=== Partick Thistle ===
Husband signed for Partick Thistle in 1938 and, apart from a brief spell as manager of Queen of the South, spent the rest of his adult life there. He was a centre back and is generally considered as one of Thistle's greatest ever players. He amassed 371 appearances and scored 12 goals during his playing career with Thistle either side of World War II (the vast majority coming in the unofficial competitions during the conflict – as a farm-worker, he was exempt from military service). He was noted for his ability to throw the ball forty yards at throw-ins.

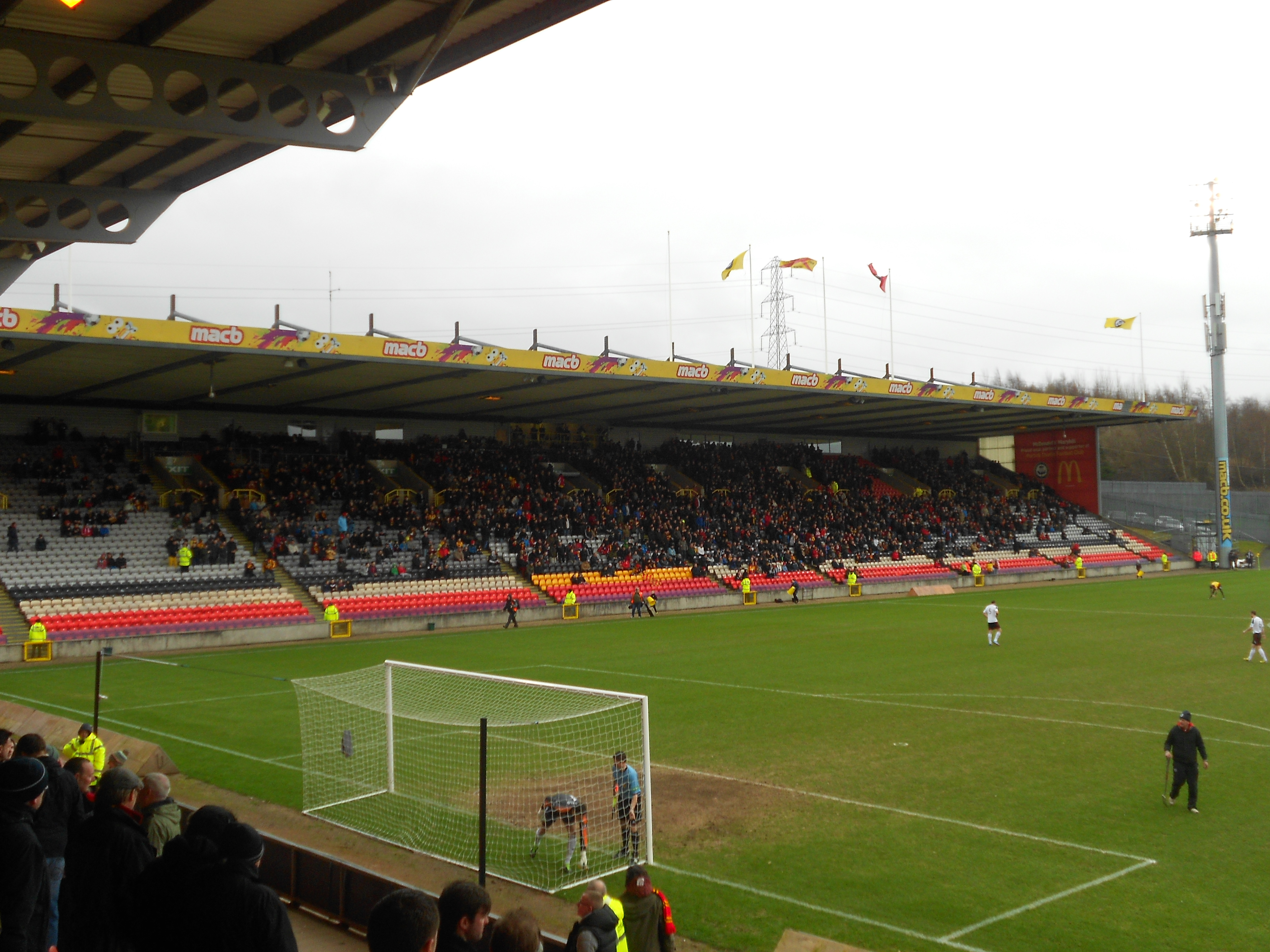
The home support stand at Firhill Stadium, home of Partick Thistle, is named after Husband.

Husband spent 52 years at Partick Thistle, first as reserve player and progressing through roles as player, captain, trainer, coach, physiotherapist and kitman and was a regular at the club until days before his death in 1992. His greatest triumph at Thistle came in 1945 where he captained the team to a win over Hibernian to win the wartime Summer Cup (the competition that replaced the Scottish Cup during the war). The stand opposite the main stand at Thistle's Firhill Stadium is named the Jackie Husband Stand.

=== International ===
Husband collected two caps for Scotland in 1946 against Switzerland (a Victory International considered official by the respective national associations) and Wales (in the 1946–47 British Home Championship), but also played in another Victory International (not considered official), and in an additional fundraising match for the bereaved and survivors of the Burnden Park Disaster, both in that same year and with England the opponents. He also represented the Scottish League once in 1947.

== Managerial career ==
Husband managed Dumfries club Queen of the South in 1967–68. In his time at Palmerston Park he worked with players such as Allan Ball, Iain McChesney, Jim Kerr, Lex Law and Billy Collings.
