= Stewart Cochrane =

Scottish footballer

Personal information
- Date of birth: 18 April 1963 (age 63)
- Place of birth: Dumfries, Scotland
- Position: Striker

Senior career*
Years	Team	Apps	(Gls)
1982–1987	Queen of the South	125	(31)
Total		125	(31)
- * Club domestic league appearances and goals

Stewart Cochrane (born 18 April 1963) is a Scottish former professional footballer who played as a striker for his local club Queen of the South.

== Background ==
Cochrane's father of the same name played once for the Doonhamers in 1957.

== Playing career ==
Cochrane's career ran parallel to the early career of Ted McMinn who played for the same team in amateur football in the Dumfries area and after leaving school they both signed for Scottish Junior club Glenafton Athletic in New Cumnock at the same time. Both then left to join Queen of the South. As a target man, Cochrane fed-off the service of Queens two wingers, McMinn and Jimmy Robertson. Both mentioned Cochrane's contribution to the team when later interviewed by the club, as did former Queens manager Nobby Clark. The Doonhamers gained promotion from the Scottish Second Division in season 1985–86, as runners-up to Dunfermline Athletic by only two points. Then Cochrane was forced to cut-short his playing career after a serious knee injury in November 1986 at East End Park versus the Pars, as Queens went on to escape relegation at the end of the 1986–87 season from the Scottish First Division by only two points.

== Honours ==
Queen of the South

- Scottish Second Division Promotion: 1985–86
