= Billy McLaren =

Scottish footballer and manager

Personal information
- Date of birth: 7 June 1948 (age 78)
- Place of birth: Glasgow, Scotland
- Position: Defender

Youth career
- –1969: Kirkintilloch Rob Roy

Senior career*
Years	Team	Apps	(Gls)
1969–1971	Dunfermline Athletic	29	(2)
1971–1972	East Fife	14	(1)
1972–1973	Raith Rovers	23	(4)
1973–1978	Queen of the South	169	(13)
1978–1980	Greenock Morton	56	(1)
1980–1982	Hibernian	38	(0)
1982–1983	Clyde	16	(1)
1983–1984	Queen of the South	29	(1)
1984–1985	Partick Thistle	5	(0)

Managerial career
- 1989–1990: Queen of the South
- 1990–1992: Hamilton Academical
- 1992–1993: Albion Rovers
- 1993–1996: Queen of the South
- 1998–1999: Albion Rovers
- 1999–2003: Stranraer
- * Club domestic league appearances and goals

Billy McLaren (born 7 June 1948 in Glasgow) is a Scottish former association football player and manager.

== Player ==
McLaren was well-travelled as a player, serving eight different Scottish league clubs. His longest service was to Dumfries club, Queen of the South. In a subsequent interview, teammate Jocky Dempster named McLaren in what he felt was the eleven best players at the club in the 1970s. Iain McChesney was another to name McLaren in the best players at Palmerston Park at the time.

He helped Hibernian gain promotion back to the Scottish Premier Division in 1981 after signing for the club in December 1980. McLaren trained with Hibs part-time while retaining a job as a civil servant.

His last club was Partick Thistle, where manager Benny Rooney had intended McLaren to coach, but he was pressed into service due to injuries to other players.

== Management ==
McLaren managed Hamilton Academical from 1990 to 1992 in a spell that most Accies fans consider to be one of their best ever. In season 1991/1992 Accies won the B&Q Cup, defeating Partick Thistle, East Fife, and Meadowbank Thistle on the way to the final at Fir Park v Ayr United in November 1991. Colin Harris scored the winning goal. Billy McLaren's Accies team came back from behind to win 13 times in season 91/92 and lost out on promotion to the Scottish Premier League by two goals. The team played with a style of football that the fans appreciated, and to this day, that team is credited with giving the fans belief that the club was capable of achieving SPL status. Notably, McLaren brought Billy Reid to Accies, the man would eventually bring them success, with promotion back into Scottish Football's top flight in season 2007/2008. Billy McLaren is still given great respect by the Accies fans when spotted scouting at New Douglas Park.

McLaren managed both Queen of the South and Albion Rovers in two different spells, resigning from the Albion job to retake the Queen of the South job in 1993. McChesney was among his back room staff in both managerial spells at Queens. It was in McLaren's first spell at Queens that he signed the teenage Andy Thomson. He is included in the hall of fame at Palmerston.

He was Stranraer manager during the 2002–03 season, when the club began a remarkable run of being either promoted or relegated every season. This brought an unsuccessful end to a spell during which he had won manager of the month awards in December 1999 and October 2002. The club had pushed for promotion in the 2000–01 season and reached the quarter-final stage of the Scottish Cup for the first time in their history, in the 2002–03 season.

McLaren is currently employed in the senior scouting group for Rangers.
