= Bobby Shearer =

Scottish footballer and manager

Personal information
- Full name: Robert Shearer
- Date of birth: 29 December 1931
- Place of birth: Hamilton, Scotland
- Date of death: 5 November 2006 (aged 74)
- Position: Right-back

Youth career
- Burnbank Athletic

Senior career*
Years	Team	Apps	(Gls)
1951–1955	Hamilton Academical	73	(13)
1955–1965	Rangers	267	(2)
1965–1966	Queen of the South	30	(0)
Total		370	(15)

International career
1961	SFL trial v SFA	1	(0)
1961	Scottish League XI	2	(0)
1961	Scotland	4	(0)

Managerial career
- 1965–1966: Queen of the South
- 1967: Third Lanark
- 1970–1971: Hamilton Academical
- * Club domestic league appearances and goals

Bobby Shearer (29 December 1931 – 5 November 2006) was a Scottish professional football player and manager. Shearer represented Scotland in four full international games.

== Playing career ==
Shearer, a right-back, played 423 times in all competitions for Rangers between 1955 and 1965, including a run of 165 consecutive games. He previously played for Hamilton Academical, his hometown club, and also for Highland League club Inverness Thistle while on National Service in the Army in the early 1950s, at Fort George Barracks just outside Inverness. His combative playing style led to him being nicknamed 'Captain Cutlass'.

He made his full Scotland debut on 15 April 1961, in the infamous 9–3 defeat against England at Wembley. It was frequently joked afterwards that as an orange football had been used, Shearer and Rangers teammate Eric Caldow had refused to kick it, while Celtic players Frank Haffey and Billy McNeill had refused to touch it. Despite this inauspicious start, Shearer won further caps against the Republic of Ireland (twice) and Czechoslovakia in World Cup qualifiers the following month, his final game being a 4–0 defeat in Bratislava.

Shearer captained Rangers to their second domestic treble in 1963–64. In all, he won five league championships, three Scottish Cups and four Scottish League Cups during his time at Ibrox.

He also deputised as goalkeeper (at least) twice, by coincidence against Hearts at Tynecastle Park on both occasions, taking over from Norrie Martin in a League Cup fixture in 1958 which Hearts won 2–1, and more impressively an 82-minute shift in place of the injured Billy Ritchie in a 3–1 Rangers victory in 1960.

== Coaching career ==
After leaving Rangers, Shearer moved to Dumfries club Queen of the South as player-coach in the era of players such as Allan Ball, Iain McChesney and Billy Collings. In January 1967, Shearer was appointed manager of ill-fated Third Lanark, who folded later that year. He moved back to his hometown club Hamilton Academical and served as their manager, amongst other tasks.

== Death ==
He died following a short illness on 5 November 2006, aged 74.
