= Rowan Alexander =

Scottish footballer & manager (born 1961)

Personal information
- Full name: Rowan Samuel Alexander
- Date of birth: 28 January 1961 (age 65)
- Place of birth: Ayr, Scotland
- Position: Striker

Youth career
- 1976–1978: Annan Athletic

Senior career*
Years	Team	Apps	(Gls)
1978–1983	Queen of the South	136	(69)
1983–1984	St Mirren	18	(3)
1984–1986	Brentford	47	(6)
1986–1995	Greenock Morton	310	(98)
1995–1998	Queen of the South	18	(2)
2002–2003	Gretna	2	(1)
Total		531	(179)

International career
- Scotland Semi-Pro

Managerial career
- 1996–1999: Queen of the South
- 2000–2007: Gretna
- 2019–2021: Gretna 2008
- * Club domestic league appearances and goals

Rowan Samuel Alexander (born 28 January 1961) is a Scottish former football player and manager.

Alexander was a prolific goal-scoring striker for Queen of the South and Greenock Morton. Alexander also played for St Mirren, Brentford and Gretna. Alexander later went into management with both the Queen of the South and Gretna.

== Playing career ==
=== Queen of the South (1st spell) ===
After spending his youth career at Annan Athletic, Alexander signed for Dumfries club Queen of the South at the start of the 1978–79 season, where he remained for five years. Whilst at Palmerston Park, Alexander won promotion from the third to second tier of Scottish football at the end of the 1980–81 season, as the Doonhamers finished runners-up to the Spiders in the SFL Second Division. Queens had players such as Allan Ball, Iain McChesney, Crawford Boyd and Jimmy Robertson playing for the club at this time. Ted McMinn, who later joined Alexander at Queens described him as being one of the best players he had the pleasure to play with at the Dumfries club.

After Alexander departed from the Doonhamers he returned to make guest appearances in:-

- The Allan Ball testimonial versus Manchester City. Other guest players for Queens included Davie Cooper, Danny McGrain and Gary Mackay
- The game on 23 April 1995 to mark Queens' 75th anniversary and the opening of the new stand (other guests included Ted McMinn, Davie Irons and Andy Thomson. The game was a 2–2 draw versus Rangers.

In his first spell at the Doonhamers, Alexander played in 136 league matches and scored 69 goals.

=== St Mirren ===
Alexander then played for Paisley club St Mirren at Love Street for the 1983–84 season and played in 18 league matches and scored three goals.

=== Brentford ===
Alexander then moved to England at the start of the 1984–85 season to play for Greater London club Brentford where he remained for two years. Alexander played in 47 league matches and scored 6 goals.

=== Greenock Morton ===
Alexander then returned to Scotland to play for the Buddies Renfrewshire rivals Greenock Morton at the start of the 1986–87 season. Alexander played at Cappielow for nine years, where he played in 310 league matches and scored 98 goals. Alexander is currently 7th in the club's post-World War II league appearances list and is also the third highest post-WW2 league goalscorer. Alexander is five goals and one place ahead of former Doonhamer, Peter Weatherson, although he trails Weatherson by 13 appearances and one place.

Alexander also won caps for the Scotland Semi-Pro team when playing for the Greenock club. Throughout his nine years with Morton, Alexander commuted from his home in Dumfries, combining his part-time football career with primary employment, including as a pig farmer and insurance salesman.

=== Queen of the South (2nd spell) ===
After leaving Morton in the summer of 1995, Alexander returned to the Doonhamers and soon after was appointed joint player-manager alongside Mark Shanks. With Queens newly appointed chairman Norman Blount getting the wheels moving on the club's revival, Alexander and Shanks reached the 1997–98 Scottish Challenge Cup Final with the Doonhamers, where they lost 1–0 to Falkirk who were playing in the tier above Queens. Alexander remained at the club until his sacking in January 1999, having played in 18 league matches and scored two goals during his second spell in Dumfries. Alexander is 14th highest in Queens all-time goalscoring charts with 78 goals, one behind Iain McChesney. He finished the 1998–99 season playing for Cumnock Juniors.

=== Gretna ===
Alexander was then appointed as Mike McCartney's replacement as player-manager of Gretna in November 2000, with the Anvils playing in non-league football in England. Alexander remained in-charge following the club's election into the Scottish Football League. Alexander played in two league matches and scored one goal during the 2002–03 season.

Following Gretna's take over by multi-millionaire Brooks Mileson, Alexander steered the club to the Scottish Third Division title in the 2004–05 season with a record-breaking total of 98 points. Success continued the following season as the club clinched promotion to the Scottish First Division and earned a place in the UEFA Cup after reaching the 2006 Scottish Cup Final, where they were eventually beaten 4–2 on penalties by Heart of Midlothian after the match ended 1–1 after extra-time. Rowan famously wore a traditional kilt in the colours of Gretna for the final.

Following Gretna's success in the 2005–06 season, Alexander signed a new five-year contract with the club and stated his intention to remain with the Anvils for the remainder of his career. Alexander was then replaced towards the end of the 2006–07 season by his assistant, Davie Irons. Alexander turned up for Gretna's first league match in the top tier of Scottish football Fir Park, the home of Motherwell on 4 August 2007 and was then refused entry to the main stand. On 6 November 2007, Alexander was officially sacked by the Anvils and this was announced to the media.

Alexander's sacking and the subsequent liquidation of the Anvils meant that Alexander was unable to receive compensation on his five-year contract. In February 2009, Alexander claimed that he was in financial difficulties as a result of this decision and was unable to obtain another job in Scottish football.

In January 2010, Alexander was appointed assistant manager of Scottish Junior club Glenafton Athletic in New Cumnock and stayed at the club until August 2010. He works as a visiting football coach to primary schools based in Cumbria and the Borders.

=== Gretna 2008 ===
After a long absence from coaching, Alexander returned to the Anvils, becoming manager of Gretna F.C.'s phoenix club, Gretna F.C. 2008, in December 2019.

Alexander was relieved of his duties on 2 September 2021.

== Honours ==
=== Player ===
Morton

- 1994-95 - Scottish Football League Second Division
- 1986-87 - Scottish Football League First Division

=== Manager ===
Gretna

- Scottish Football League Division Three - Champions; 2004–05
- Scottish Football League Division Two - Champions; 2005–06
- Scottish Cup - Runners Up; 2005–06
- Scottish Football League Division One - Champions; 2006–07
