= John Connolly (Scottish footballer) =

Scottish footballer and manager

Personal information
- Date of birth: 13 June 1950 (age 76)
- Place of birth: Barrhead, Scotland
- Position: Outside left

Youth career
- 1966–1968: Glasgow United

Senior career*
Years	Team	Apps	(Gls)
1968–1972	St Johnstone	96	(41)
1972–1976	Everton	108	(16)
1976–1978	Birmingham City	57	(9)
1978–1980	Newcastle United	49	(10)
1980–1982	Hibernian	34	(8)
1982–1983	Gateshead	?	(?)
1982–1983	Blyth Spartans	?	(?)
1983–1984	Gateshead	?	(?)
Total		344	(84)

International career
1973	Scotland	1	(0)

Managerial career
- 1982–1983: Blyth Spartans
- 1984: Whitley Bay
- 2000–2004: Queen of the South
- 2004–2005: St Johnstone
- * Club domestic league appearances and goals

John Connolly (born 13 June 1950) is a Scottish former football player and manager who played as an outside left.

Connolly played for St Johnstone, Everton, Birmingham City, Newcastle United, Hibernian, Gateshead and Blyth Spartans during an 18-year playing career. He earned one full international cap for Scotland. Additionally, he became a player-manager with Blyth Spartans and then managed Whitley Bay, Queen of the South and St Johnstone.

== Playing career ==
=== St Johnstone ===
Connolly was born in Barrhead, Scotland and began his football career as a junior with Glasgow United before turning professional with St Johnstone in January 1968. Connolly played in the 1969 Scottish League Cup Final at Hampden Park versus Celtic, who were on their way to their second European Cup Final in four seasons. The Perth club lost narrowly 1–0 with Connolly later commenting, "We gave them the fright of their lives". The Perth Saints plundered league wins at Ibrox Park and Celtic Park with Connolly in their ranks.

John Connolly's only experience of playing European football was when he was at the Muirton Park club, after they finished third in Scotland's highest division and they had managed to knock out Hamburg.

Former Queens player Nobby Clark stated in an interview that Connolly was the best player he had ever played against directly.

=== Everton ===
Everton manager Harry Catterick paid £75,000 to sign Connolly for the Goodison Park club in March 1972 and such was Catterick's determination to conclude the signing that he forced himself from his sick bed.

Whilst at the Toffees, Connolly earned a full international cap playing for Scotland versus Switzerland in Bern and he had already earned four Under-23 caps.

Connolly had to recover from leg breaks on two occasions with Everton and when their manager, Catterick was replaced by Billy Bingham, the two didn't really get on, so eventually Connolly asked for a transfer and signed for Birmingham City in September 1976 for a fee of £90,000.

=== Later career ===
Connolly spent two seasons with the Blues and his second one was disrupted by injury. Connolly then signed for Newcastle United and later played at Hibernian beside George Best, before playing for Gateshead and Blyth Spartans, where he acted as player-manager.

== Managerial career ==
=== Queen of the South ===
Connolly was appointed manager of Dumfries club Queen of the South in July 2000 and he appointed Iain Scott as his assistant. With the club's captain Jim Thomson and his fellow centre-back Andy Aitken, Connolly led the club to the Scottish Second Division Championship in the 2001–02 season, as they clinched the title at Station Park, Forfar with a 3–0 win versus the Loons. Connolly was the first Doonhamers manager to win a title since Jimmy McKinnell, Jr. won the Second Division in the 1950–51 season.

In the following season, the Doonhamers won the Scottish Challenge Cup after defeating Brechin City 2–0 in the Final at Broadwood Stadium, with Andy Goram and Robbie Neilson in the starting eleven.

Connolly departed Palmerston Park at the end of the 2003–04 season and the club replaced him with his assistant, Iain Scott.

=== St Johnstone ===
Connolly replaced Billy Stark as the manager of his former club St Johnstone in the 2004 close season. After a disappointing first season in-charge at McDiarmid Park, Connolly was relieved of his contract on 4 April 2005, as the club finished in eighth position in the 2004–05 Scottish First Division. Connolly was then replaced by Owen Coyle.
