= Willie McLean (footballer, born 1935) =

Scottish footballer and manager

Personal information
- Date of birth: 2 April 1935 (age 91)
- Place of birth: Ashgill, Scotland
- Position: Winger

Youth career
- –1956: Larkhall Thistle

Senior career*
Years	Team	Apps	(Gls)
1956	Hamilton Academical (trialist)	1	(0)
1956–1958	Airdrieonians	20	(2)
1958–1960	Sheffield Wednesday	0	(0)
1960–1961	Alloa Athletic	34	(18)
1961–1962	Queen of the South	46	(10)
1962–1964	Clyde	20	(1)
1964–1965	Alloa Athletic	6	(1)
1965–1968	Raith Rovers	81	(5)
Total		208	(37)

Managerial career
- 1973–1975: Queen of the South
- 1975–1978: Motherwell
- 1978–1979: Raith Rovers
- 1979–1983: Ayr United
- 1984–1985: Greenock Morton
- * Club domestic league appearances and goals

Willie McLean (born 2 April 1935) is a Scottish former footballer and manager. He managed two of the clubs he had played for, Queen of the South and Raith Rovers.

== Brothers ==
Willie is the elder brother of Jim McLean and Tommy McLean, who also played and managed for senior Scottish clubs.

== Queen of the South ==
McLean was part of the 1961/62 George Farm managed Queen of the South side that won promotion to the top division of Scottish football. As well as player/manager Farm, McLean was a teammate of Neil Martin, Jim Patterson and Iain McChesney.

McLean returned to Dumfries in the 1970s, this time as manager. In 1975 his second-place finish was only denied promotion to the top division of Scottish football by league reconstruction. He left Palmerston Park that summer and was replaced by Mike Jackson.
