= Jimmy Rutherford =

Scottish footballer

Jimmy Rutherford was a professional Association footballer. From his short time with Dumfries club Queen of the South he jointly holds the club record for the highest number of goals scored in a season. He averaged more than a goal per game with the club.

== Queen of the South ==
Jimmy Rutherford played 65 first team games for Queen of the South in which he averaged slightly above one goal per game with 66 goals. He jointly holds the club record for the most goals in a single season when he hit 41 goals in season 1931-32. However some of these were cup goals and as such he does not hold the record for the most league goals in a season (that record is held by Jimmy Gray who scored 37 league goals in season 1927-28). In Rutherford's record breaking season he scored five goals in one game, a Scottish Cup 11-1 victory at Palmerston Park against Stranraer. The other goals were by George Derby (2), Jenkins, Dyer, McCall, McDonald. This result is the club record high scoring win. However Rutherford's five goals in a single game is not a club record as this has been surpassed by the six goals by Jimmy Gilmour versus Arbroath on 2 February 1926 and Jim Patterson versus Cowdenbeath on 16 December 1961.

Despite his goals per game ratio he does not hold the goals per game record for the club. Hughie Gallacher joined Queens when he was 17 and scored 19 goals in his 9 games for Queens. Rutherford's goals per game ratio at Queens does however compare well against other prominent forwards to have played for Queens surpassing such as Dave Halliday, Billy Houliston, Jim Patterson, Neil Martin, Andy Thomson and Stephen Dobbie. Halliday in his time at Queens had not yet converted from left winger to centre forward.
