= Ian Reid (footballer) =

Scottish footballer

Personal information
- Date of birth: 6 February 1951 (age 75)
- Place of birth: Glasgow, Scotland
- Position: Forward

Youth career
- Nottingham Forest

Senior career*
Years	Team	Apps	(Gls)
1970–1973	Dundee United	12	(3)
1973–1978	Queen of the South	154	(79)
1978	Airdrieonians	7	(2)
1978–1980	Forfar Athletic	29	(7)
- * Club domestic league appearances and goals

Ian Reid (born 6 February 1951) is a Scottish former professional footballer, who played as a striker for Dundee United, Queen of the South, Airdrieonians and Forfar Athletic.

== Career ==
Reid was born in Glasgow and started his career as a youth player at Nottingham Forest. However he was unable to secure a senior contract.

He joined Dundee United in July 1970, making his senior debut the following month. Despite an impressive early impact, including scoring against Grasshoppers in the Inter-Cities Fairs Cup, he spent most of his three years at the club playing in the reserves. Reid played in 12 league matches for the Tannadice Park club and scored 3 goals.

Reid signed for Queen of the South in September 1973, having initially turned down the move the previous month. Reid played in 193 matches in all competitions for Queens, with 154 of those being league matches. Reid is tenth equal in Queens all-time goalscoring charts alongside Jimmy Robertson with 89 goals in all competitions, with 79 being league goals. Fellow player Ian McChesney described Reid as 'the player who made things tick'. Reid's Queens career came to an end in January 1977.

He transferred for a fee of £4,000 to Airdrieonians. There he played in 7 league matches and scored 2 goals.

Reid then played with Forfar Athletic. There he played in 29 league matches and scored 7 goals.
