= Alan Davidson (Scottish footballer) =

Scottish footballer

Personal information
- Date of birth: 17 April 1960 (age 66)
- Place of birth: Airdrie, Scotland
- Position: Goalkeeper

Youth career
- Royal Albert

Senior career*
Years	Team	Apps	(Gls)
1979–1980	Celtic	0	(0)
1980–1981	Royal Albert		
1981–1982	Airdrieonians	10	(0)
1982–1988	Queen of the South	211	(0)
1988–1989	Floreat Athena		
1989–1994	Queen of the South	101	(0)
1994	Ards		
1994–1997	Albion Rovers	22	(0)
1997–1998	Kirkintilloch Rob Roy		
1998–1999	Armadale Thistle		
- * Club domestic league appearances and goals

Alan Davidson (born 17 April 1960) is a Scottish former football goalkeeper. Davidson is the son of former FIFA referee Bob Davidson.

== Early years ==
Davidson played his youth football with Royal Albert until June 1979, before joining Celtic for the start of season 1979–80. Davidson played in the reserve and youth teams during his season at Celtic Park. He re-joined Royal Albert for the 1980–81 season.

== Airdrieonians ==
Davidson signed for Airdrieonians at the start of the 1981–82 season, where he played in 10 first team matches. Airdrieonians finished bottom of the Scottish Premier Division at the end of that season and were relegated.

== Queen of the South (both 1st & 2nd spells combined) ==
Davidson signed for Queen of the South first time around at the start of season 1982–83 and stayed for six seasons before signing for Australian club Floreat Athena for season 1988–89. Davidson returned at the start of season 1989–90 and stayed for another five seasons. In his two spells with the club Davidson made a total of 364 first team appearances (312 league & 52 cup) and is 10th highest in the club's record appearances list. Davidson played over a decade with Queen of the South during his two spells at the football club.

Davidson is described as being one of Queen of the South's longest club servants during the decade of the 1980s, along with Jimmy Robertson and George Cloy. Former teammates Ted McMinn and Tommy Bryce listed Davidson as among the best players that they played beside at Queens. Barry Nicholson listed Davidson among his favourite players when interviewed on his boyhood as a supporter of Queens.

== Floreat Athena ==
Davidson signed for the Australian club Floreat Athena for season 1988–89, before returning from Perth, Western Australia for his second spell at Palmerston Park.

== Albion Rovers & Junior Football ==
After leaving Queen of the South, Davidson had a short spell with Northern Irish football club Ards F.C. before signing for Albion Rovers at the start of season 1994–95. Davidson stayed at Cliftonhill for three seasons, playing 22 league games, before playing a season with junior outfits Kirkintilloch Rob Roy and Armadale Thistle before retiring from the game at the age of 39.
