= Billy Collings =

Scottish footballer (born 1940)

Personal information
- Date of birth: 10 June 1940 (age 86)
- Place of birth: Glasgow, Scotland

Youth career
- Vale of Clyde

Senior career*
Years	Team	Apps	(Gls)
1958–1961	Morton	48	(14)
1960–1962	Dumbarton	11	(6)
1961–1962	Berwick Rangers	16	(7)
1962–1964	Cambuslang Rangers		
1964–1970	Queen of the South	193	(24)
1970–1973	Stranraer	101	(6)
1973–1974	Gretna		
- * Club domestic league appearances and goals

Billy Collings (born 10 June 1940) is a Scottish former footballer who played for Greenock Morton, Dumbarton, Berwick Rangers, Cambuslang Rangers, Queen of the South, Stranraer and Gretna.

== Playing career ==
=== Morton, Dumbarton & Berwick ===
Collings started his senior career as a teenager playing for Greenock Morton. At the same time he served his apprenticeship as a bricklayer working at Greenock shipyards.

He then joined Dumbarton where he picked up the only sending-off of his senior career. Next on Collings' travels was Berwick Rangers after which he stopped playing completely.

=== Cambuslang Rangers ===
Collings was playing snooker in Bridgeton YMCA when he was approached by Davie McLachan to play for Cambuslang Rangers in the West of Scotland Junior league. Collings agreed to join.

At Cambuslang with Collings was ex Queen of the South trainer Jimmy McGuire and ex Queens left back Charlie Hammill.

Despite being a marked man as an ex-pro, Collings remembers his Junior League time with affection. Cambuslang Rangers won the West of Scotland Junior League and also made it to the Scottish Junior Cup Final. In the semi-final played at neutral Firhill he picked up an injury that essentially ended his involvement in the fixture. Struggling to run he was moved to left wing where he finished the game.

After the game, he was at home when police came to the door to tell him that he was required to attend hospital immediately. At hospital he was told that his earlier diagnosis was inadequate as it had since been recognised that there was issue that hadn't been noticed. Collings was subsequently diagnosed as having a broken rib and a punctured lung. He played in the final after taking an injection from a specialist. The final was won by Johnstone Burgh.

=== Queen of the South ===
Collings was signed by Queen of the South manager George Farm when the Dumfries club were in Scotland's top division. Collings was paid a retainer of £5 per week for remaining with Cambuslang ahead of joining Queens in the close season to start his career as a full-time footballer. However, Farm was sacked as manager in January and Queens were relegated at the season's end. Collings was facing part-time Second Division football of which he had had enough of at Berwick. Before the new season's start he approached club official Jimmy McKinnell Junior to request a free transfer – the request was rejected.

Now aged 24, Collings made his debut for Queens on 8 August 1964 against Montrose in the Scottish League Cup, and netted a debut goal in the 2–0 home victory.

Collings was an attacking midfielder of the old school – one who was as happy exchanging lumps with opposing defenders as sticking the ball in the net. He earned £8 a week when he broke into the Queens first team.

In Queens' first 2 seasons after Collings' breakthrough (1964–65 and 1965–66) they missed out on promotion back to Scotland's top flight by one place by finishing third. They again finished third in his last season at the club (1969–70). Over six seasons Collings scored 31 goals in his 247 appearances for Queens excluding friendlies.

Collings' last game for Queens was in the 2–0 away win against East Fife on 25 April 1970.

=== Stranraer & Gretna ===
Collings left Queens in 1970 signing for Stranraer. Collings scored for Stranraer in a 5–5 draw against Queens at Stair Park when Queens came back from 5–2 down. Collings also scored to put Stranraer 1–0 ahead against Celtic in the League Cup at Stair Park in 1972.

At Stranraer the player of the year title was awarded by Willie Marshall of Marshall's buses. After having been presented with the title on the Saturday evening of the season end dinner and dance Collings was told on the following Monday that he was being released by the club. Collings joined non-League Gretna where he finished his playing career.

== After football ==
After retiring as a footballer Billy Collings worked as manager of a Peugeot car sales operation. He has three children and six grandchildren and has stayed in Dumfries since his days as a Queens player. Collings enjoys his retirement watching Queen of the South and playing golf with former club mate and now Queens honorary director Allan Ball.
