= Ernie Hannigan =

Scottish footballer

Personal information
- Full name: Ernest Hannigan
- Date of birth: 23 January 1943
- Place of birth: Glasgow, Scotland
- Date of death: 21 May 2015 (aged 72)
- Place of death: Perth, Australia
- Position: Outside right

Senior career*
| Years | Team | Apps | (Gls) |
| 1961–1964 | Queen of the South | 99 | (6) |
| 1964–1967 | Preston North End | 98 | (28) |
| 1967–1969 | Coventry City | 47 | (6) |
| 1969 | Torquay United | 2 | (0) |
| 1970–1971 | Morton | 32 | (6) |
| 1971 | New York Cosmos | 10 | (0) |
| 1972 | New Jersey Brewers | | |
| | Queen of the South | 13 | (0) |
| | Raith Rovers | 5 | (2) |
- Stirling City
- Morley Windmills
- * Club domestic league appearances and goals

Ernest Hannigan (23 January 1943 – 21 May 2015) was a Scottish footballer. Hannigan was a fast, tricky, right winger. He is perhaps best known for his games at 3 clubs and the partnership he forged with Scotland international centre forward Neil Martin at 2 of them; 147 games at Queen of the South and 47 at Coventry City (he played with Martin at both) and also for 98 games in between at Preston North End.

== Career ==
=== Queen of the South ===
Ernie Hannigan kicked off his professional career joining Jimmy McKinnell Junior's Queen of the South in 1961, the Dumfries based club having spotted him playing amateur football in Glasgow with St Roch. As Hannigan later said, "Going to Queen of the South turned out to be a great move". Fast and tricky, he made his debut there at 17 on 5 April 1961 away to Albion Rovers. George Farm – Blackpool goalkeeper when winning the 1953 F.A. Cup final – became manager in the close season. Farm signed future Scotland international centre forward Neil Martin. Hannigan and Martin formed a great pairing that helped Queen of the South gain promotion back to the Scottish First Division (then Scotland's top flight). Also still at Queens at this time was Jim Patterson (251 strikes for the club make Jim Patterson the all time goals king of Queens).

Hannigan's two remaining seasons at Queens were spent playing top division football. In this spell Queens recorded a 1-0 league victory away to Celtic. Teammate Iain McChesney later in an interview reflecting on his 20 years at Queens named Hannigan as being amongst the best player he played beside.

Ernie Hannigan stayed with Queens at Palmerston Park making 99 league appearances scoring 6 league goals until he was 20 when Preston signed him for £15,000 in June 1964. He would return to the club for a short spell in 1972 to make a further 13 league appearances. In total he would make 147 appearances scoring 8 goals for Queens.

=== Preston North End ===
Hannigan's debut was in the fourth match of the season in a 1–1 draw against Cardiff City at Deepdale on 31 August 1964. But appearances for Hannigan were limited in his first season in England, making just 11 first team appearances, as the number seven shirt was held for the remainder of the season by Dave Wilson, the 1964/65 season was the last before substitutes were allowed in the game.

The following season saw Ernie Hannigan make 29 league appearances and scored his first goal in a 5–2 defeat at Southampton in November 1965. Hannigan then scored in the next two matches against Derby County and Cardiff . Hannigan scored a brace in the FA Cup third-round 3–2 victory against Charlton Athletic. Hannigan scored a further goal in the Fifth Round as PNE beat Tottenham Hotspur 2–1, before losing in the Quarter Finals against Manchester United in a replay.

Ernie Hannigan ended the season in great form scoring six of his eleven league goals in the last four matches of the season, culminating in a hat-trick on the last day of the season when Cardiff were beaten 9–0 at Deepdale.

The 1966/67 season saw Ernie Hannigan as an ever-present and finished with 12 goals one behind leading scorer Alex Dawson. Hannigan scored twice in a match on two occasions in a win over Birmingham City and a 5–1 victory at Northampton Town.

The following season saw Ernie Hannigan again score twice in a match on two occasions in a 3–1 victory at Norwich City and a 3–0 home win against Cardiff . His last appearance for PNE was on 4 November 1967 in a 1–1 home draw against. Hannigan had scored 28 goals from 98 appearances for Preston.

=== Coventry City & Torquay United ===
Hannigan joined Coventry City, who was playing in their first season in the top division, in November 1967 for a fee of £55,000. It had been a difficult start for Coventry as Noel Cantwell had replaced Jimmy Hill as manager in October 1967 and then took ten games before the new manager had got a win with the Sky Blues bottom of the table. In February 1968 Coventry won three games in a row to take them out of the relegation zone and Hannigan was joined by his old Queens partner Neil Martin who had signed from Sunderland for £90,000. Hannigan contributed five league goals during the 1967/68 season for Coventry as they eventually just avoided relegation, finishing third from bottom, one point above Sheffield United. He scored one goal the following season as Coventry again finished third from bottom, this time one point above Leicester City.

Of manager Noel Cantwell, Hannigan later said: "Cantwell was a nice guy but I used to argue with him all the time about the way he wanted me to play. I was a winger who wanted to take players on, but he wanted my first touch to be a cross into the box to aim for Tony Hateley and Neil Martin who were our two big centre-forwards."

Hannigan joined Torquay United on loan in December 1969, playing in the draws at home to Reading and Bournemouth, that month before returning to Coventry.

=== Later career ===
On leaving Coventry in 1970, Hannigan returned to Scotland with Morton, scoring six times in 32 league games. Hannigan then moved abroad by having a short spell in South Africa and United States by joining New York Cosmos in 1971. In Hannigan's second spell at Queen of the South in 1972 he would play his last game for the club away to Montrose on 23 September 1972., having spent the summer playing for the New Jersey Brewers. His last spell in the UK was with Raith Rovers where he found the net twice in five league games.

He then spent one season with Eastern Hong Kong before emigrating to Perth, Western Australia joining Stirling City. In 1975, he won a D'Orsogna Cup with Morley Windmills who he had joined the previous year as player-coach. Hannigan was also the recipient of the D'Orsogna 'Fairest and Best' Medal and runners-up in the Rothmans 'Fairest and Best' Medal. Hannigan made the first of twelve appearances for the Western Australian State in May 1974 against Scottish side Aberdeen and later played in the side that won the Mara Halim Cup, an international tournament in Indonesia. In 1979, he moved to Stirling Macedonia, again as player-coach, and in 1982 joined Spearwood Dalmatinacs, retiring from playing in 1983. In 1985, he was appointed coach of Galeb, a position he held until 1986, and later coached Yugal from 1991 to 1992

Hannigan gained the reputation as one of the best outside-right's Western Australian fans had seen. He was inducted into the Western Australian Hall of Fame when the Hall of Fame Committee selected the top one hundred players over the past Century. Hannigan was one of the 28 1970's players selected in the 'Century of Champions' when the ceremony took place in July 2004.

== Later life ==
Hannigan lived in Perth and owned an industrial cleaning business. His business partner was the late Derek McKay (who died 20 April 2008 in his sleep whilst on holiday with family in Thailand) who played for Aberdeen and scored a brace in the 1970 Scottish Cup Final against Celtic. In 2011 Hannigan took the coach's role at amateur side Perth Celtic in their first season; he guided them to the championship and promotion to division 2. The club was formed by the West Australian Celtic supporters club. Hannigan had been battling cancer and died at the age of 72 on 21 May 2015
