= Tommy Bryce =

Scottish footballer and manager

Personal information
- Date of birth: 27 January 1960 (age 66)
- Place of birth: Johnstone, Scotland
- Position: Midfielder

Youth career
- –1980: Ferguslie United

Senior career*
Years	Team	Apps	(Gls)
1980–1982	Kilmarnock	12	(0)
1982–1985	Stranraer	101	(14)
1985–1987	Queen of the South	83	(35)
1987–1989	Clydebank	74	(26)
1989–1992	Ayr United	110	(30)
1992–1993	Clydebank	24	(1)
1994–1998	Queen of the South	176	(49)
1998–1999	Partick Thistle	19	(3)
1999	Queen of the South	6	(0)
1999–2000	Arbroath	39	(6)
2000–2001	Stranraer	15	(0)
Total		659	(164)

Managerial career
- 1998–1999: Partick Thistle
- 2013–2015: Glenafton Athletic
- * Club domestic league appearances and goals

Tommy Bryce (born 27 January 1960) is a Scottish former footballer. Bryce had a playing career spanning 21 seasons from 1980 to 2001 with Scottish Football League clubs Kilmarnock, Stranraer, Queen of the South, Clydebank, Ayr United and Arbroath.

Bryce also served as player-manager of Partick Thistle during the 1998-99 season. Since retiring as a player Bryce has been a manager in Scottish Junior football.

== Career ==
Bryce was signed for Queens by manager Nobby Clark. Bryce is referred to at as 'Tommy Bryce Mark 2' to avoid confusion with the Tommy Bryce who played for Queens in the 1970s. When Bryce (Mark 2) was later interviewed for the Queens official website, among those he named as the best players he played beside were George Cloy, Jimmy Robertson, Alan Davidson and Jim Thomson.

At Queens Bryce scored a hat-trick in 1 minute and 46 seconds meriting an application to the Guinness Book of Records as the fastest hat-trick in senior football. Bryce is also the seventh highest goalscorer in the Dumfries club's history with 95 goals.

The appointment of Bryce as Partick Thistle's player-manager in 1998 came as a surprise. Bryce failed to turn the club's fortunes around that season, however, and he was replaced by John Lambie in March 1999.

On 18 July 2013 Bryce was appointed the manager of Scottish Junior club Glenafton Athletic from New Cumnock. . On 4 January 2015 Bryce resigned as the manager of Glenafton Athletic.

== See also ==
- List of footballers in Scotland by number of league appearances (500+)
