= Firhill Stadium =

Football stadium in Glasgow, Scotland

- WrightKerr Stadium at Firhill
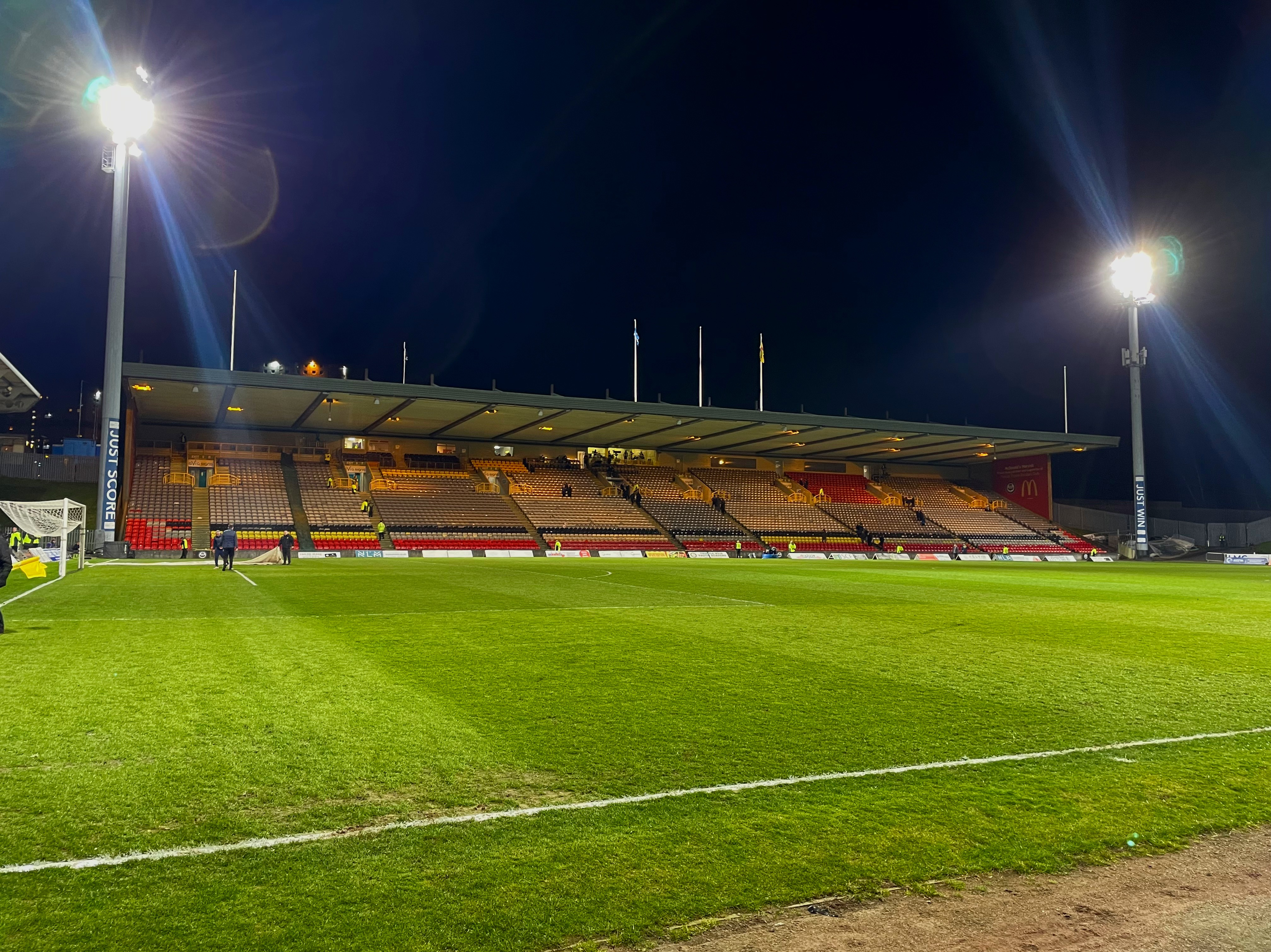

- Location in Glasgow
- Location: Glasgow, Scotland
- Coordinates: 55°52′53″N 4°16′10″W
- Owner: Partick Thistle F.C.
- Capacity: 10,102
- Surface: Grass
- Field size: 105m x 69m (pitch)

Construction
- Opened: 1909

Tenants
- Partick Thistle F.C. Clyde F.C. Hamilton Academical F.C. Queen's Park F.C. Glasgow Warriors: 1909–present 1986–1991; 1994–1997, 1999–2001; 2021–2022; 2005–2006, 2007–2012

Firhill Stadium, also known as the WrightKerr Stadium at Firhill for sponsorship reasons, is a football and former rugby union, rugby league and greyhound racing stadium located in the Maryhill area of Glasgow, Scotland which has been the home of Partick Thistle since 1909.

Past ground-sharing agreements have seen Firhill act as a temporary home for three other football clubs: Clyde, Hamilton Academical and Queen's Park. It was also a venue for the 2000 Rugby League World Cup and the Glasgow Warriors rugby union team between 2007 and 2012. As of 2014, the all-seated capacity of Firhill is 10,102.

== History ==
Partick Thistle played at various sites between 1876 and 1891, including Kelvingrove, Jordanvale Park and Muir Park. The club settled at Meadowside, beside the River Clyde, in 1891. They were forced out of this site in 1908, however, to make way for a shipyard. The club found some spare Caledonian Railway land in Maryhill, the site was purchased by the club for £5,500, and construction started soon after. The ground was due to open on 21 August 1909, but the match was postponed because it had not been declared safe for public use and planning consent had not been obtained. Firhill opened a month later.

The record attendance for a Partick Thistle game at Firhill was set against Rangers in 1922, when 49,838 people attended. The present main stand was constructed in 1927, at which time the terraces were expanded. Although the main stand resembles an Archibald Leitch design, it was in fact designed by David Mills Duncan, who had previously worked for Leitch. The stadium's attendance record was set by the 1928 British Home Championship match between Scotland and Ireland, when 54,728 people attended.

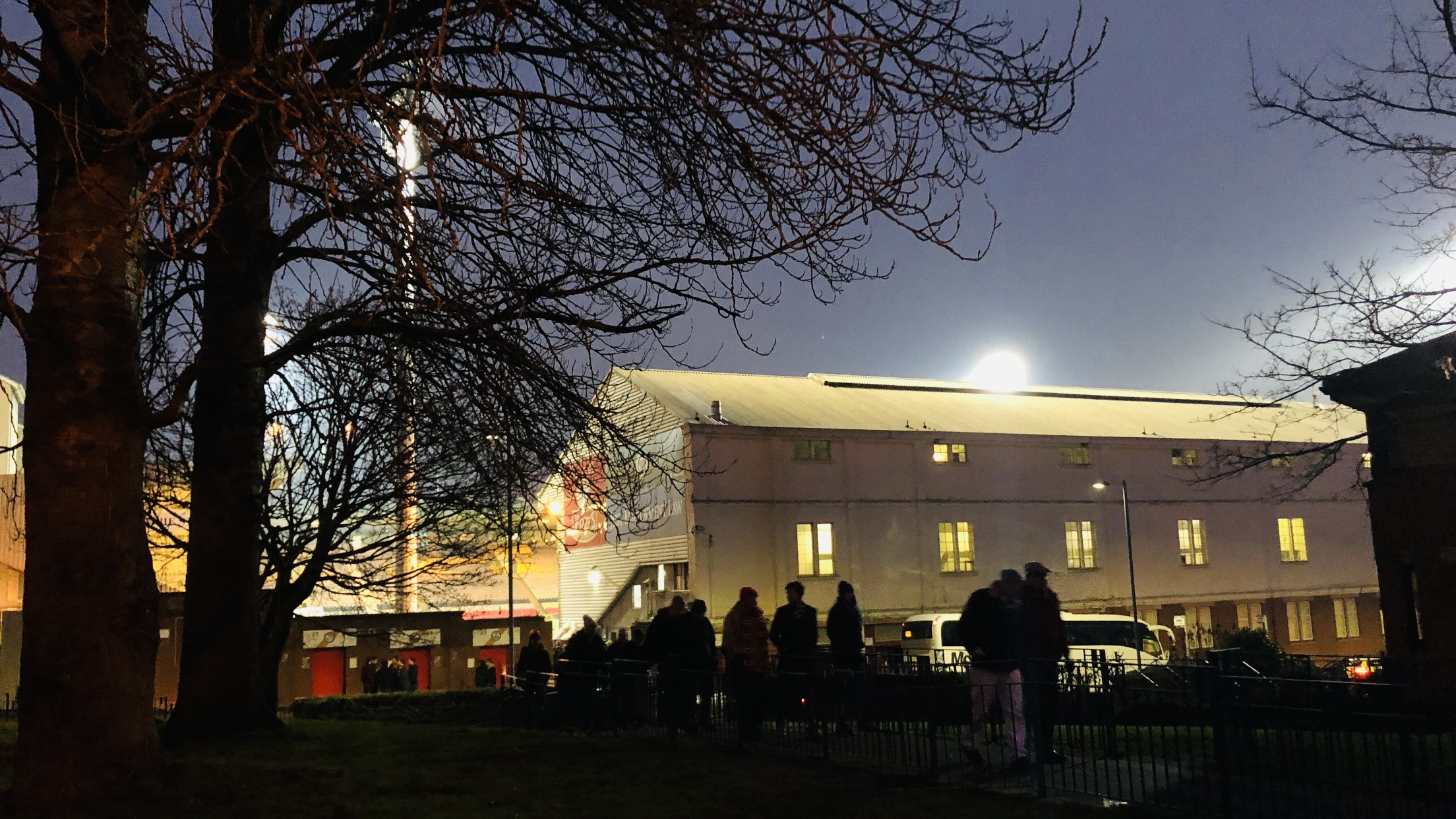
Fans leaving the stadium after an evening match in 2019.

There were no further improvements until the early 1950s, when Thistle had a relatively successful period. This success financed a roof over part of the terracing and floodlights, which were first used in a friendly match against Tottenham Hotspur in November 1955. Firhill hosted the first European Cup match ever to be played in Glasgow, when Swedish club Djurgården played their "home" leg against Hibernian in the 1955–56 season in the city as a result of the freezing conditions in Sweden at the time of the match.

Firhill became designated under the Safety of Sports Grounds Act in 1977, which reduced its capacity from over 40,000 to 20,500. In 1986, Firhill became the first Scottish ground in modern times to be used by more than one team, when Clyde moved in after being evicted from Shawfield. This arrangement lasted until 1991. Hamilton Academical then shared Firhill with Thistle in two different spells, the first arrangement beginning in 1994. To cope with the resulting additional usage, undersoil heating was installed in 1994.

The North Stand was built in 2002 to meet the Scottish Premier League criteria on stadium capacity, which stated at the time that member clubs must have 10,000 seats in their ground. Ironically this criterion was later changed to only 6,000 seats, which not only allowed for the relegation of Partick Thistle, but meant they had constructed a stand which cost the club unnecessarily. Originally, the stand only ran for two-thirds the length of the pitch, but it was extended in 2003. The construction of this stand was assisted by the sale of some land to allow the construction of student flats which now lie behind the stand.

The stadium was also known as the Wyre Stadium at Firhill starting 26 June 2023 as part of a sponsorship deal. On 7 August 2026, after the naming rights deal with Wyre expired, Partick Thistle FC signed a rights deal with WrightKerr All Trades, renaming the stadium to WrightKerr at Firhill.

== Structure and facilities ==
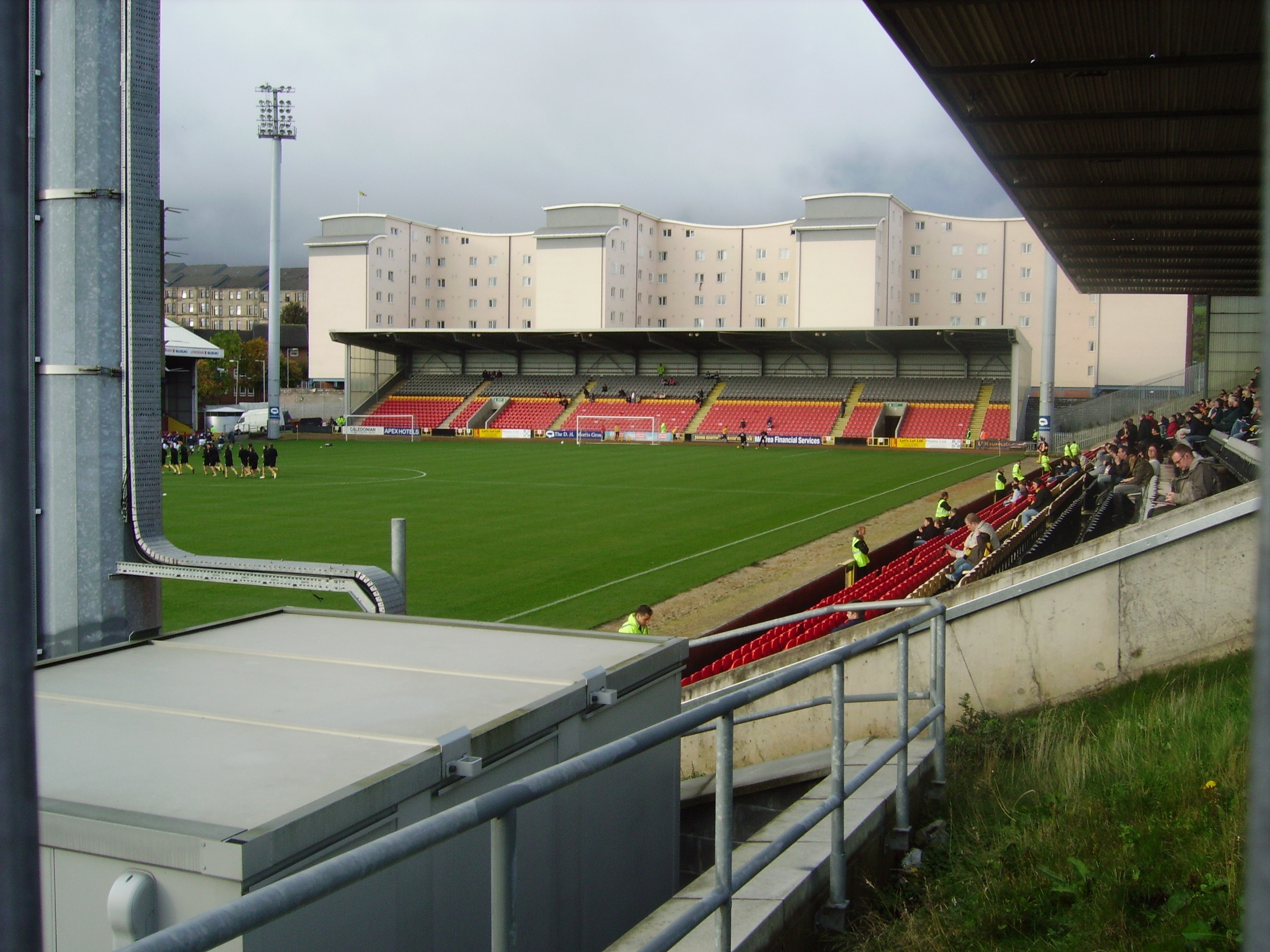
The John Lambie (north) Stand

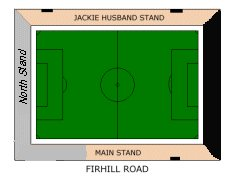

The modern stadium comprises three seated stands, with an unused area at the south end. The current capacity of the ground includes 10,102 seats with no standing areas available. The Main Stand was built with an original capacity of 6,000 seats, however in recent times the capacity has been reduced. In January 2006, the club announced that the Main Stand would no longer be used on matchdays due to high maintenance and stewarding costs. There were exceptions to this, such as a Scottish Cup match against Rangers and for Glasgow Warriors matches against Edinburgh. When Thistle achieved promotion to the Scottish Premiership in 2013, the Main Stand was reopened to house away supporters, and is used by away fans of more than 500. The Main Stand was renamed the Colin Weir Stand in 2016 in tribute to the club's first ever patron.

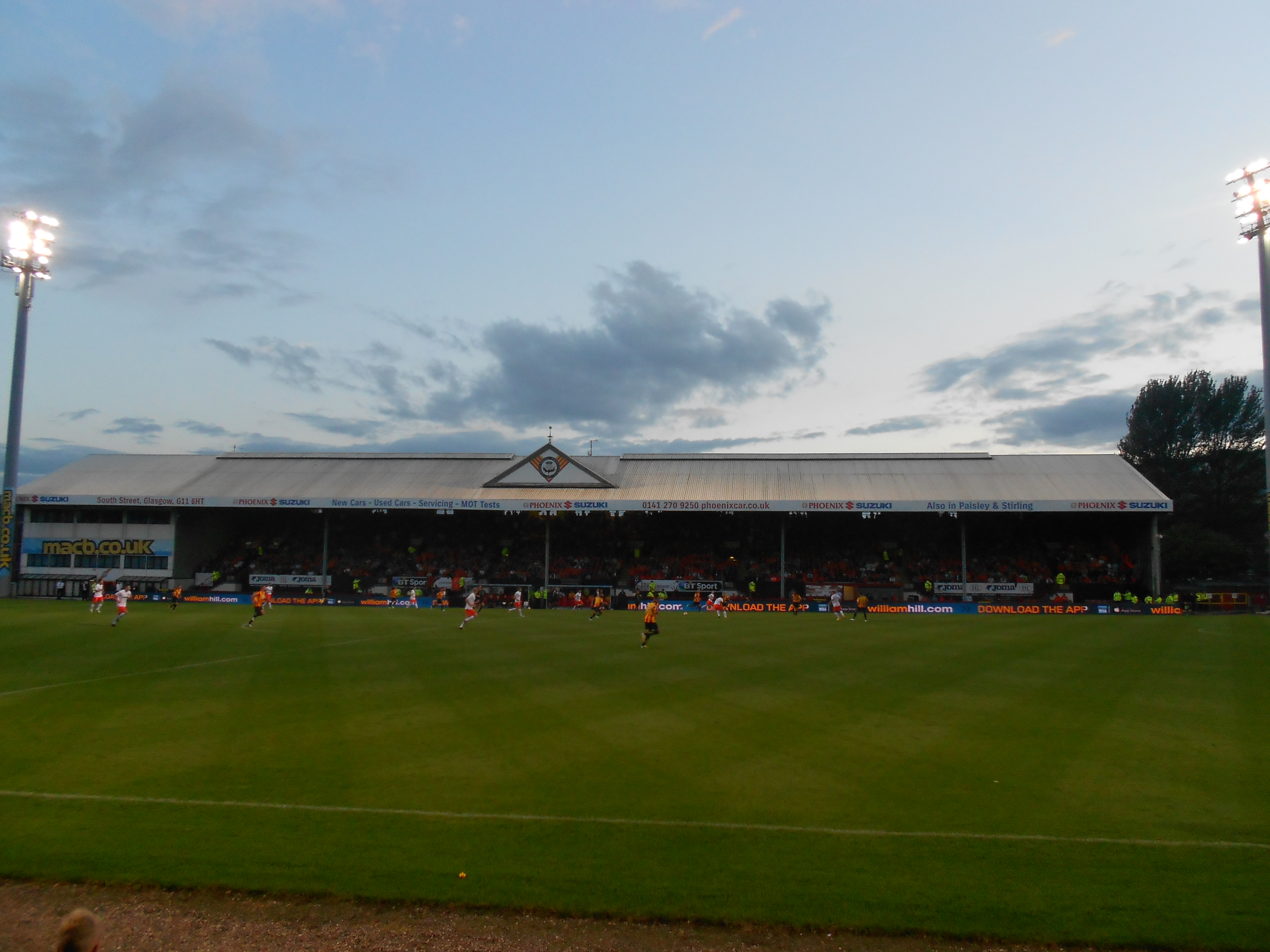
The Colin Weir (main) Stand

Home fans now occupy the stand opposite the old stand, the Jackie Husband Stand; the north end of this stand is also host to away fans numbering less than 500. The stand is a large cantilever building, and was constructed in December 1994 with a capacity of 6,263 and is named after former Thistle player Jackie Husband.

The newest stand is the John Lambie Stand, at the north end of the ground. This was built in 2002 to replace the old terracing, in order to comply with SPL standards. This has a capacity of 2,014, houses Thistle's singing section and was named after former Thistle manager John Lambie in April 2018.

== Future developments ==
In 2010, Thistle had announced plans to replace the disused terracing at the south end of the ground, commonly known as the "City End" with a new structure that would consist of a 1,000-seat stand as well as residential and office accommodation. However, planning permission from Glasgow City Council was not forthcoming. The grassy bank at the City End has come to be known by the fans as "The Bing".

On 7 November 2014, it was announced that planning permission had been submitted to Glasgow City Council to redevelop the southern end of the stadium. On this site, a new 450-seater stand will be built, complete with 79 residential flats and also office and retail space. The proposals are identical to those issued to the council in July 2010. Tim Clark of ZM Architecture, the company handling the application, stated: "The timescale for concluding the original consent has now ceased and our client wishes to resubmit the original application as they still have intentions to develop the site, which was interrupted by the downturn in the financial market in the intervening years."

== Other uses ==
=== Rugby Union ===
In December 2005, Firhill became the home of Glasgow's professional rugby union team, Glasgow Warriors, when they moved from their previous base at Hughenden Stadium. After returning to Hughenden in 2006, the Warriors took up a two-year residency at Firhill from the start of the 2007–08 Celtic League season. This was extended in April 2009 for a further five years. Glasgow Warriors left Firhill after the 2011–12 season and moved to Scotstoun Stadium.

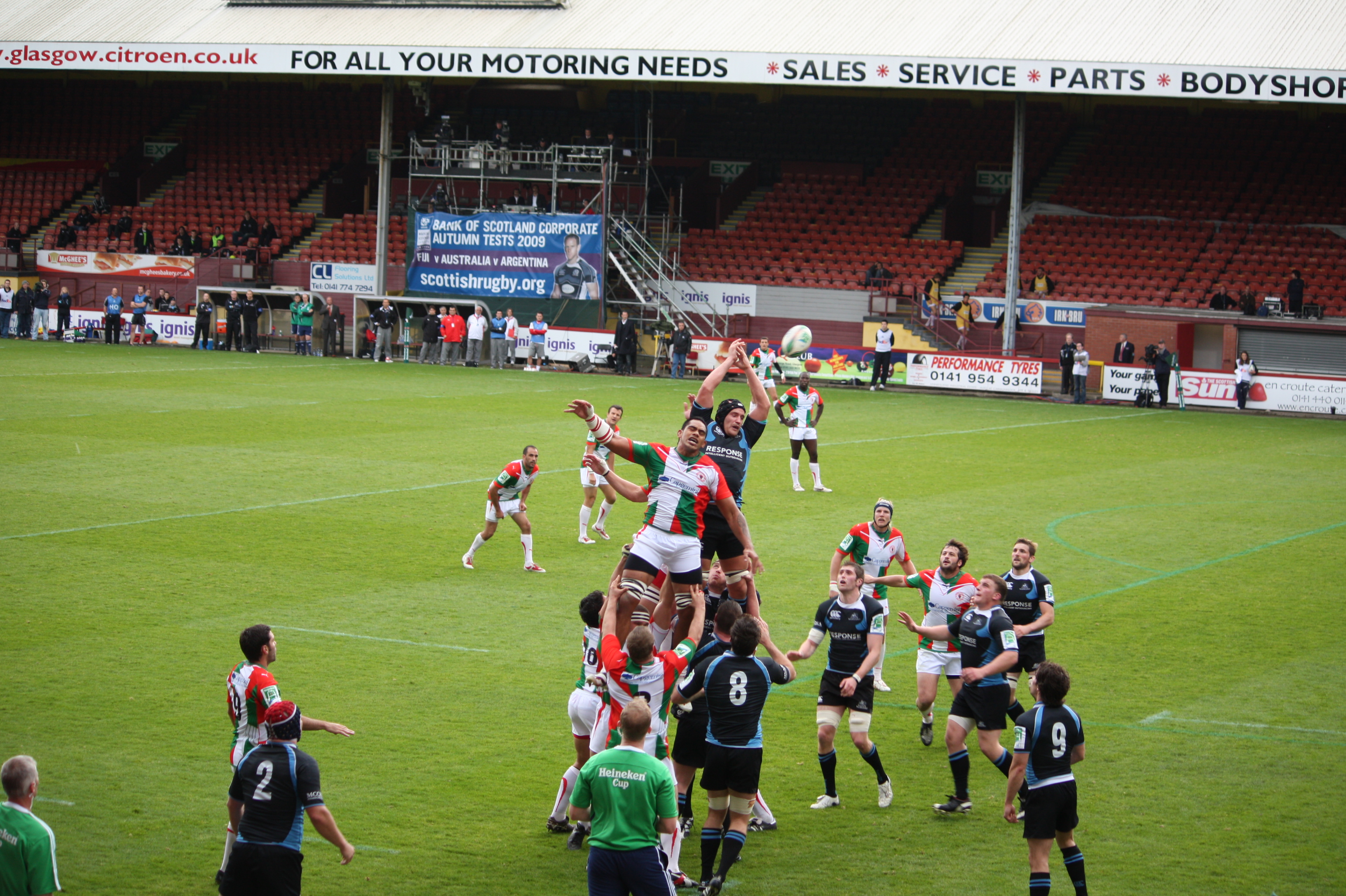
Glasgow Warriors playing Biarritz at Firhill on 10 October 2009.

=== Rugby League ===
In 1996, Firhill was the site of the Scottish national rugby league team's first game on home soil, with a victory against Ireland. Rugby league, very much a minority sport in Scotland, has returned to the ground on several occasions since, including for the 2000 World Cup.

=== Greyhound racing ===
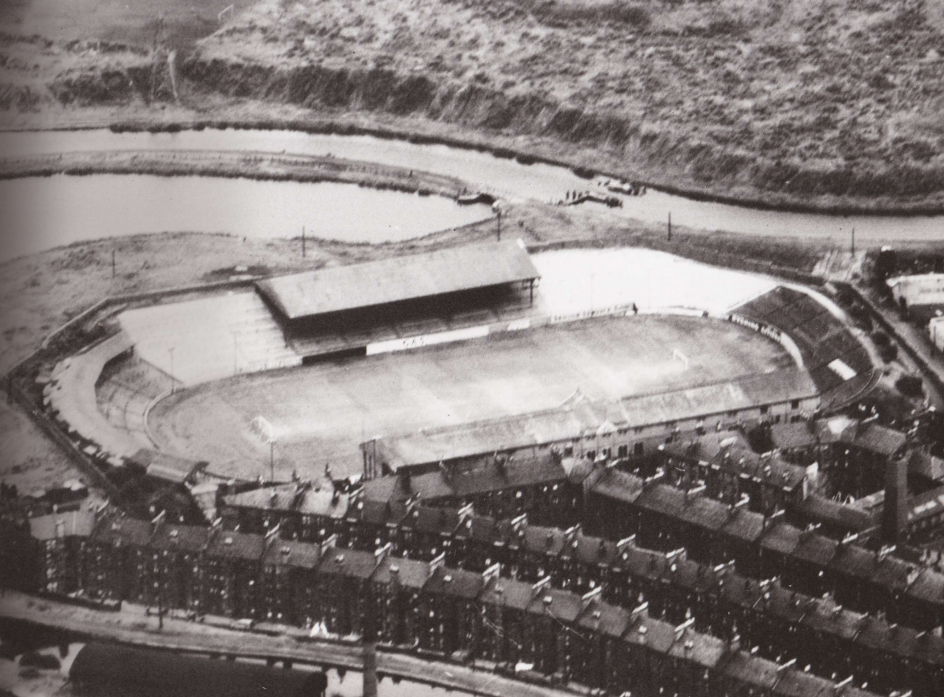
Firhill greyhound track c. 1940

Greyhound Racing took place from 1928 until 1957. An oval greyhound circuit 400 yards in circumference was added to the stadium around the football pitch in 1928 and a totalisator board was erected above the second bend between terracing. The racing started on 23 April 1928 as an independent (unlicensed) track before the joining of the British Greyhound Tracks Control Society (BGTCS) in 1933.

Licensed racing started on Monday 23 January 1933 with a hastily arranged meeting; greyhounds had only qualifying to race on the previous Thursday, Friday and Saturday trial sessions. The company responsible for the greyhound racing was the Firhill Greyhound Racing Company Limited and their managing director was John Bilsland, the same man that formed part of syndicates responsible for opening Southend-on-Sea (Kursaal) and having interests in three Liverpool greyhound tracks. Racing took place at Firhill every Monday, Wednesday, Friday and Saturday at 7.45pm with races held over 280 and 480 yards (mainly handicaps).

The extra revenue helped Partick Thistle overcome serious financial difficulties and when the BGTCS disbanded in 1935 the stadium management headed by David Mitchell and W I Bilsland joined the National Greyhound Racing Club (NGRC) and continued to capitalise on a greyhound racing boom. By March 1950 falling attendances and competition from other Glasgow tracks forced Firhill to resign from their NGRC affiliation. The chairman John Bilsland stated that the cost of NGRC membership exceeded £1,000 per year. During January 1957 Racing Manager Ernest Ganly announced that the track was going to close to greyhound racing. He blamed falling attendances but the owner trainers disagreed citing the policy of only running company owned greyhounds at the track as being the main cause.

Track records

Distance yards	Greyhound	Time	Date
480	Stranger	27.76	29.07.1939
680	Tarmatic	40.89	04.06.1940

== Television ==
In 1999, the stadium briefly featured in a Chewin' the Fat sketch.

Firhill was used heavily in 2000 as a location for the television series Taggart in the episode "Football Crazy", in which the fictional team Strathclyde F.C. wore the same kits as Thistle and played at the ground. Scenes for the 2010 BBC television drama Single Father, starring Scottish actor David Tennant, were filmed at Firhill.

== Transport ==
Maryhill railway station, which is served by trains from Glasgow Queen Street, is the closest railway station to Firhill. The walk between the two sites takes between 20 and 25 minutes. Firhill is better served by the Glasgow Subway, with Kelvinbridge and St George's Cross stations within 15 minutes walk of the stadium. The A81 road (Maryhill Road), leading to Firhill Road, runs from the M8 motorway.

== See also ==
- Stadium relocations in Scottish football
