= Jim Thomson (footballer, born 1971) =

Scottish footballer

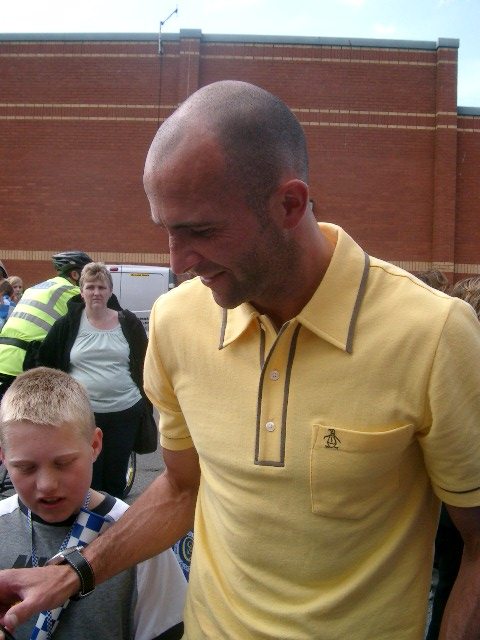

Personal information
- Full name: James Thomson
- Date of birth: 15 May 1971 (age 55)
- Place of birth: Stirling, Scotland
- Position: Defender

Youth career
- 1987–1991: Campsie Black Watch

Senior career*
Years	Team	Apps	(Gls)
1991–1996	Clyde	151	(11)
1996–1997	Stenhousemuir	13	(0)
1997–1999	Queen of the South	65	(3)
1999–2001	Arbroath	44	(2)
2001–2010	Queen of the South	242	(7)
Total		515	(23)

Managerial career
- 2016: Queen of the South (caretaker)
- 2018–2019: Kilsyth Rangers
- * Club domestic league appearances and goals as of 00:42, 25 September 2018 (UTC)

James Thomson (born 15 May 1971) is a Scottish footballer. Nicknamed 'JT', Thomson was a central defender. Thomson's greatest achievements were during his 358 appearances for Queen of the South, where he was club captain. Thomson also enjoyed some success in shorter periods at Clyde and Arbroath and also played for Stenhousemuir. Thomson had a short spell as caretaker manager of Queen of the South during November and December 2016 and was most recently player-manager of Kilsyth Rangers in the SJFA West Region Championship.

== Playing career ==
=== Clyde ===
Thomson began his senior football career at Clyde in 1991. Thomson made 151 league appearances and scored 11 goals. Clyde were Scottish Football League Division Two Champions in 1992–93 when Thomson was at the club and clinched the title at Palmerston Park, Dumfries away to Queen of the South, with a 3–2 win.

=== Stenhousemuir ===
Thomson then had a short spell with Stenhousemuir during season 1996-97 making thirteen league appearances and scored no goals.

=== Queen of the South ===
Thomson first joined Dumfries club Queen of the South as the club were rebuilding in 1997 in the post Harkness era. New chairman Norman Blount was getting the wheels moving on the club's revival. In 1997 the club reached the Scottish Challenge Cup Final for the first time. Second Division Queens lost 1–0 to First Division Falkirk, despite a rousing Queens display at Motherwell's Fir Park, a performance that included the man of the match award going to Queens veteran central midfield playmaker Tommy Bryce and an early career appearance for Jamie McAllister. A late effort from Derek Townsley denied Queens an equaliser, as his gilt-edged chance went over the bar.

Thomson made 65 league appearances during his first spell for Queens and scored 3 goals.

In a later interview on the club website, reflecting on his time at Queens, McAllister listed Thomson among the best players that he played with at the club.

=== Arbroath ===
Thomson next went to Arbroath making 44 league appearances and scored 2 goals. He then followed in the footsteps of another distinguished player, Jimmy Binning, by leaving Arbroath to join Queen of the South. Thomson and his teammates ended the season in a promotion spot in the league.

=== Return to Queen of the South ===
He was 'player of the season' three times over a ten-year period for the Dumfries club. In late August and early September 2006 Thomson had a 'clean up' operation on his knee but came back successfully, including scoring with an overhead kick.

Thomson made his 300th Queens appearance on 20 October 2007 in a First Division match against St Johnstone and is one of the select players to have made more than 300 appearances for Queen of the South.

Thomson captained Queens during the 2007–08 Scottish Cup 4–3 semi-final victory against Aberdeen (the club he supported as a child); he was the first man to captain Queens in a Scottish Cup semi-final victory. As well as captaining the side in the final, Thomson also scored Queens' equaliser to bring the game against Rangers to 2–2. Despite Queens' battling second half display, Rangers eventually ran out 3–2 winners. As Scottish Cup runners-up, Queens qualified for the 2008–09 UEFA Cup. Thomson captained the team in their second qualification round games against Danish side FC Nordsjælland.

When Tommy Bryce was interviewed for the Queen of the South website, he named Thomson as being among the best players he had played beside at Queens. Thomson was also commended for his efforts when Andrew Coltart was interviewed for the club website.

Thomson was given a testimonial by Queens on 18 July 2010. The result was a 1–0 win for Rangers. Thomson was retained as a player for the 2009–10 season after making 358 first team appearances and scoring a dozen goals. Thomson is 11th in the club's all time appearances list and also coached the under-19s team for the 2010–11 season. In his second spell at Queens, Thomson made 242 league appearances and scored 7 goals.

Thomson overall played in 307 league matches and scored 10 league goals in his combined spells in Dumfries.

== Career after playing ==
Thomson was appointed commercial manager at Queens on 1 June 2011, succeeding Mark McMinn .

Thomson was appointed football development manager during May 2016.

After Gavin Skelton left the club in November 2016, Thomson was appointed caretaker manager. Thomson reverted to his club role as football development manager after Gary Naysmith was appointed manager on 1 December 2016, alongside his assistant Dougie Anderson.

In the summer of 2018, Thomson was appointed team manager of his hometown club, Kilsyth Rangers. On 28 September 2019, he left the role.

== Personal life ==
Thomson has two daughters with wife Victoria, from whom he separated in November 2016 and subsequently divorced. She then married one of the players he coached while caretaker manager at Queen of the South, Lyndon Dykes.

== Managerial statistics ==
As of 13 December 2016

Team	Nat	From	To	Record				
Team	Nat	From	To	G	W	D	L	Win %
Queen of the South	(Scotland)	12 November 2016	3 December 2016	4	1	0	3	25.00
Total				4	1	0	3	25.00
