= Jim Kerr (footballer, born 1942) =

Scottish footballer

Personal information
- Date of birth: 3 October 1942
- Place of birth: Kirkconnel, Scotland
- Date of death: 2008 (aged 65–66)
- Position: Central defender

Senior career*
Years	Team	Apps	(Gls)
- Kello Rovers
1959–1971	Queen of the South	316	(13)
- Kello Rovers
- * Club domestic league appearances and goals

Jim Kerr (3 October 1942 – 2008) was a Scottish professional footballer who played for Queen of the South, as a central defender.
