= Andy Thomson (Scottish footballer) =

Scottish footballer

Personal information
- Full name: Andrew Thomson
- Date of birth: 1 April 1971 (age 55)
- Place of birth: Motherwell, Scotland
- Position: Striker

Youth career
- 1988–1989: Jerviston Boys Club

Senior career*
Years	Team	Apps	(Gls)
1989–1994	Queen of the South	175	(93)
1994–1998	Southend United	122	(28)
1998–1999	Oxford United	38	(7)
1999–2001	Gillingham	52	(14)
2001–2003	Queens Park Rangers	67	(28)
2003–2004	Partick Thistle	21	(5)
2004–2006	Falkirk	28	(9)
2006–2007	Queen of the South	27	(5)
2007–2008	Stenhousemuir	18	(5)
Total		548	(194)

Managerial career
- 2026–: Heart of Midlothian Women
- * Club domestic league appearances and goals

Andrew Thomson (born 1 April 1971) is a Scottish former professional footballer who is head coach of Scottish Women's Premier League club Heart of Midlothian Women. Thomson played in 548 league matches, scoring 194 league goals in a career that saw him play for Queen of the South, Partick Thistle, Falkirk and Stenhousemuir in Scotland and Southend United, Oxford United, Gillingham and Queens Park Rangers in England.

== Playing career ==
=== Queen of the South (first spell) ===
Thomson was born in Motherwell. He signed on 28 July 1989 for Dumfries club Queen of the South from Motherwell-based boys' club Jerviston as an 18-year-old. As Thomson became more experienced the goals started to flow and never stopped in his five seasons at Palmerston Park. Arguably his finest achievement with Queens was the 1990–91 Scottish League Cup run to the quarter finals, where Queens eliminated higher division opponents Dundee and Dunfermline Athletic, before being defeated by a late goal versus Celtic at Parkhead.

Thomson scored 109 goals in all competitions during his first spell in Dumfries, with 93 of those goals scored in 175 league appearances. In season 1993–94, Thomson was Queens Player of the Year and was also awarded the Scottish Second Division's Player of the Year Award, that he also won for the 1991–92 season. Thomson was also Scottish football's top scorer for the 1993–94 season.

Aberdeen offered "Queens" £150,000 for Thomson but the club rejected the "Dons"' bid. Southend United then offered £250,000 and a deal was agreed between the two clubs that led to Thomson leaving for Essex on 4 July 1994 to join Peter Taylor's Shrimpers at Roots Hall. As well as being a record transfer fee paid at that particular time by the "Shrimpers", this still remains the highest fee received by Queens.

Andy Thomson returned to Scotland to play for a Queen of the South Select on 23 April 1995. The opposition in the 2–2 draw was Rangers in a match to mark Queens' 75th anniversary and the opening of the new East Stand. Other guests for Queens included Ted McMinn, Davie Irons and Rowan Alexander.

=== Southend United and Oxford United ===
Thomson played for Southend United from 1994–95 until 1997–98, where he scored 28 goals in 122 league appearances, then spent the 1998–99 season playing for Oxford United, where he scored 7 goals in 38 league appearances.

=== Gillingham ===
Thomson signed for Gillingham on 5 August 1999 for £25,000 just before the season started. Peter Taylor had now signed Thomson for the second time in his managerial career and later described the transfer deal as the best £25,000 he had ever spent.

On 28 May 2000, Thomson scored the winning goal for Gillingham in the Football League Second Division play-off final at Wembley Stadium. Thomson had come on as an extra time substitute in the 97th minute of the game. Thomson scored with two minutes of play left on the clock. Following Ty Gooden's centre from the left, the diving Thomson stole in front of Stuart Balmer to glance the ball into the far corner of the net. The 3–2 win versus Wigan Athletic ensured the Kent club's first ever promotion to the second tier of English football. The club's website described the goals as, "The most iconic moment in the long history of Gillingham Football Club encapsulated in a few moments of extra time football". The anniversary of the match is also commonly referred to as "St. Thommo's Day" amongst Gillingham fans in honour of the goal. Thomson became the second former "Queens" player to win a Wembley play-off final after Ted McMinn.

Thomson also scored four goals in consecutive rounds of Gillingham's 1999–2000 FA Cup run, versus Cheltenham Town, Walsall, Bradford City and Sheffield Wednesday. The "Gills" were knocked out of the FA Cup in the quarter finals, the first time they had ever reached so far, at Stamford Bridge, when they lost 5–0 to Chelsea.

Thomson scored 14 goals in 52 league appearances for the "Gills" in his two seasons at Priestfield, which were 1999–2000 and 2000–01.

=== Queens Park Rangers ===
Thomson then signed on a free transfer for Queens Park Rangers on 22 March 2001 and stayed at Loftus Road until the end of the 2002–03 season. During his time with the London side Thomson featured as a 60th minute substitute in the 1–0 loss in the 2003 Football League Second Division play-off final to Cardiff City.

Thomson then returned to Scotland on 10 July 2003.

Thomson scored 28 goals in 67 league appearances for QPR in his two seasons at Loftus Road, which were 2001–02 and 2002–03.

=== Return to Scotland ===
Thomson played for Partick Thistle in the 2003–04 season, where he scored 5 goals in 21 league appearances and then Falkirk for two seasons, which were 2004–05 and 2005–06, where he scored 9 goals in 28 league appearances and won the 2004–5 Scottish First Division title.

Thomson returned to the Doonhamers at the start of the 2006–07 season. Thomson said on his return to Queens, "Things have changed quite a bit while I've been away – a new stand, a completely new set-up and a more modern type of training system". Thomson added, "Norman Blount was an excellent chairman."

During his second spell at Palmerston Park, Thomson scored 5 goals in 27 league appearances and overall, Thomson scored 114 goals in his two spells in Dumfries and is currently the fifth highest all-time goalscorer for the Doonhamers. Thomson was surpassed by Derek Lyle during the 2017–18 season as Lyle finished his Queens career with 117 goals, who was then surpassed by Stephen Dobbie at the start 2018–19 season when he scored a brace versus Edinburgh City on 21 July 2018 in the Scottish League Cup.

Thomson then joined Stenhousemuir for the 2007–08 season, where he scored 5 goals in 18 league appearances until he was troubled by injuries and was forced to announce his retirement to the media on 18 March 2008.

== Coaching career ==
Thomson started his coaching career as head coach of the University of Strathclyde's men's football team and he led them to the British Universities and Colleges League Championship in 2014 and 2015. Thomson then joined Edusport Academy as head coach, a football academy for young French players studying in Scotland, who currently play in the Lowland League. Thomson then joined the University of Stirling's men's football team, as assistant manager to the club's manager Shelley Kerr. In August 2017, Thomson was appointed assistant coach of the SWNT, joining up again with Shelley Kerr. He remained with the SWNT and the University of Stirling until March 2022, when he was appointed as Football Development Manager at the Motherwell F.C. Community Trust.

Thomson has a UEFA A-Licence and holds an MSc in Performance Coaching from the University of Stirling. Since August 2017, Thomson had been coaching at the Scottish Football Association's Performance School at Braidhurst High School in Motherwell.

On 28 February 2025, Thomson was appointed women's first-team assistant coach at Rangers.

On 1 June 2026, Thomson was appointed head coach of Heart of Midlothian Women.

== Honours ==
=== Player ===
Gillingham

- Football League Second Division play-offs: 2000

Falkirk

- Scottish First Division: 2004–05

Individual

- PFA Second Division Players' Player of the Year: 1991–92, 1993–94
- Queen of the South Player of the Year: 1993–94
