= George Cloy =

Scottish footballer and coach

George Cloy is a Scottish former professional footballer who played his entire 12-year senior career with Dumfries club Queen of the South as a utility player. Cloy also played for Kello Rovers, Threave Rovers, Dalbeattie Star and Crichton.

When later interviewed for the Queens website, Cloy listed Ted McMinn, Allan Ball, Tommy Bryce, Jimmy Robertson and Chris Balderstone as amongst the best players that he played alongside.

Cloy was later a coach at Abbey Vale.
