= Crawford Boyd =

Scottish footballer

Personal information
- Date of birth: 19 March 1995 (age 31)
- Place of birth: Kilwinning, Scotland
- Position: Defender

Youth career
- 1972: Largs Thistle

Senior career*
Years	Team	Apps	(Gls)
1972–1979	Queen of the South	117	(4)
1979–1981	Hearts	40	(0)
1981–1985	Queen of the South	20	(1)
1985	Irvine Meadow		
- * Club domestic league appearances and goals

Crawford Boyd is a Scottish former professional footballer.

Crawford Boyd is best known for his time at Dumfries club, Queen of the South The defensive cornerstone of the 1970s returned to Queens during the promotion campaign of 1980–81 to make a total of 321 first team appearances. Boyd played in the same promotion squad as Allan Ball, Iain McChesney and Jimmy Robertson.

Boyd also played two seasons for Hearts including the 1979–80 promotion campaign, making 40 appearances. Boyd had left Palmerston at the start of that campaign, as had his long serving teammate Jocky Dempster.

A product of Largs Thistle, he went to manage the club after his playing career ended.
