= Jocky Dempster =

Scottish footballer

Personal information
- Date of birth: 8 October 1948 (age 78)
- Place of birth: Muirkirk, Scotland
- Position: Right winger

Youth career
- Muirkirk

Senior career*
Years	Team	Apps	(Gls)
1969–1979	Queen of the South	297	(78)
1979–1980	St Mirren	3	(0)
1980–1981	Clyde	15	(5)
- Cumnock
Total		315	(83)
- * Club domestic league appearances and goals

John 'Jocky' Dempster (born 8 October 1948) is a Scottish former professional footballer who played as a right winger, mainly for Queen of the South and also St Mirren and Clyde.

== Career ==
Dempster played with junior outfit Muirkirk before signing for Queen of the South at the start of the 1969–70 season.

Dempster is best known for his time Queens in Dumfries. The 1970s goalscoring winger and penalty taker found the net 98 times during 355 first-team matches for the Doonhamers and is the sixth highest goalscorer in the club's history. Dempster played alongside teammates Allan Ball, Iain McChesney and Crawford Boyd, who were named amongst the best eleven that Dempster played with at Palmerston Park.

Queens narrowly missed out on promotion in Dempster's first season at Palmerston, the 1968-70 season, as the club finished third in the table behind Falkirk and Cowdenbeath respectively, in Scottish League Division Two.

After leaving Palmerston Park, Dempster played for senior clubs St Mirren and Clyde for a season a-piece, before moving to Scottish Juniors club Cumnock.
