= Jimmy Robertson (footballer, born 1955) =

Scottish footballer (born 1955)

Personal information
- Full name: James Robertson
- Date of birth: 3 December 1955 (age 70)
- Place of birth: Glasgow, Scotland
- Height: 1.85 m (6 ft 1 in)
- Position: Left winger

Youth career
- 1976–1977: Rangers

Senior career*
Years	Team	Apps	(Gls)
1977–1978	Motherwell	5	(0)
1978–1980	Stranraer	51	(4)
1980–1987	Queen of the South	250	(62)
1987–1989	Greenock Morton	43	(5)
1989	Clydebank	8	(0)
1989–1993	Queen of the South	92	(15)
- * Club domestic league appearances and goals

James Robertson (born 3 December 1955) is a Scottish footballer who played as a left winger from 1977 until 1993. Roberston played for Motherwell, Stranraer, Queen of the South, Morton and Clydebank.

== Career ==
Robertson grew up in Glasgow and played amateur football with Newton Mearns Rovers and Muirend Amateurs before signing for junior outfit East Kilbride Thistle. Rangers manager Jock Wallace then signed Robertson at the start of the 1976–77 season. Robertson never made the first team at Ibrox and played reserve team football that season. At the start of season 1977–78, Motherwell manager Willie McLean signed Robertson. He went straight into the Motherwell first team in what was the third season of the Premier Division. Robertson played in five league matches for Motherwell without scoring any goals, before Willie McLean left the club and Roger Hynd was appointed manager in his place. Some of Robertson's teammates that season included Willie Pettigrew, Bobby Graham, Peter Marinello, Peter Millar, Joe Wark, Gregor Stevens and Colin McAdam. Roger Hynd never selected Robertson to play for the first team and he left the club to join Stranraer at the start of the 1978–79 season, playing in 51 league matches and scoring 4 goals in his two seasons at Stair Park.

Robertson is probably best known for his time with the Dumfries football club Queen of the South, where he made 400 appearances and is seventh highest in the club's record appearances list. Robertson had two spells at Palmerston Park. Robertson's first spell was from 1980 until 1987 and his second spell was from 1989 until 1993. Robertson was uncharacteristically tall for a winger and possessed mesmerising ball control. Robertson was looked upon as a wizard by many Queen of the South supporters and regarded as one of the finest left wingers to have played for the club, as well as being a cult hero.

Robertson was a match winning Queens player in two successful promotion campaigns. The first of those was in season 1980–81 when they were runners-up to Queen's Park in the Second Division. Robertson was also voted the Second Division's Player of the Year that particular season. The second time around they were runners-up in season 1985–86 to Dunfermline Athletic, also in the Second Division.

In his two spells at the club Robertson scored a total of 89 goals and he's tied tenth in the all-time goalscoring charts for the Dumfries club alongside Ian Reid. For many Queen of the South supporters, Robertson is best remembered for the number of times he glided past a befuddled right full back before swinging in another pinpoint left foot cross. Allan Ball, Ted McMinn, Tommy Bryce, Nobby Clark and George Cloy have all since been interviewed by the Queen of the South official website and named Robertson as one of the best players they played beside at the club. Robertson was remembered by Barry Nicholson as one of his favourite players from his boyhood as a Queen of the South supporter.
