= Queen of the South F.C. =

Association football club in Dumfries, Scotland

Queen of the South
- Full name: Queen of the South Football Club
- Nicknames: The Doonhamers; Queens
- Short name: QOS
- Founded: March 1919; 107 years ago
- Ground: Palmerston Park, Dumfries
- Capacity: 8,690
- Coordinates: 55.070377°N 3.624621°W
- Chairman: Billy Hewitson
- Manager: Nicky Clark
- League: Scottish League One
- 2025–26: Scottish League One, 3rd of 10
- Website: qosfc.com
Home colours	Away colours

Queen of the South Football Club is a Scottish professional football club formed in 1919 in Dumfries. The club plays in Scottish League One, the third tier of Scottish football. Like residents of Dumfries, they are traditionally nicknamed the Doonhamers; but are more usually referred to as Queens and abbreviated to QOS or QOTS. Their home ground is Palmerston Park. Nicky Clark is the club's player-manager.

The club won the Division B Championship in 1950–51, the Second Division Championship in 2001–02 and 2012–13, and the Scottish Challenge Cup in 2002–03 and 2012–13. Queens led Scotland's top division until New Year in the 1953–54 season: their highest finish in Scotland's top division was fourth in 1933–34. The club reached their first major cup final in 2008 when they reached the final of the Scottish Cup, where they were runners-up to Rangers.

== Stadium ==
Palmerston Park is located on Terregles Street in Dumfries. The club has played there since 1919. Former South of Scotland League club Heston Rovers shared Palmerston from 2013 to 2021. The stadium has a capacity of 8,690 of which 3,377 are seats.

== Supporters and culture ==
Robbie Neilson, the former manager of Hearts, said about Queens from his loan period at the club in 2002: "It's a well-run club and a real family club with a good spirit about the place."

Marc Horne wrote in The Scotsman following Queens appearance in the 2008 Scottish Cup Final: "In the Palmerston Park club's songbook, it is clear there is no room for songs which feature religion, violent vendettas or centuries-old battles that took place in other lands."

Historic table positions of Queen of the South in the League.

In the 2008 UEFA Cup qualifying trip to Denmark, Queen of the South fans were hailed as "a great credit both to their club and to Scotland" by Danish police. About 850 supporters of the Dumfries club travelled to Denmark to watch the UEFA Cup clash with FC Nordsjælland. Although their team was eliminated, local police said their behaviour was impressive. Inspector Rune Hamann said: "It was a pleasure hosting such a visit by Queen of the South whose supporters were extremely well behaved and a great credit both to their club and to Scotland. Copenhagen was particularly busy in the build up to and after the match with a carnival, party atmosphere being evident. I look forward to welcoming Queen of the South and their terrific supporters back in Denmark in the future."

Chief Inspector Mickey Collins from Dumfries and Galloway Constabulary said the fans were a "pleasure to work along with". He added: "Despite the huge numbers of supporters who travelled to Denmark there were no arrests, incidents or issues of any concern. Great praise should be passed on to those fortunate enough to be at the match".

A notable Queen of the South supporter is the DJ and producer Calvin Harris, who grew up in Dumfries. He considered writing a song to celebrate the team reaching the 2008 Scottish Cup Final, but the idea was scrapped due to the time constraints of recording his 2009 album Ready for the Weekend. Bill Drummond, musician, producer, and former member of The KLF, is also a supporter of the club, having grown up in nearby Newton Stewart.

=== Mascot ===
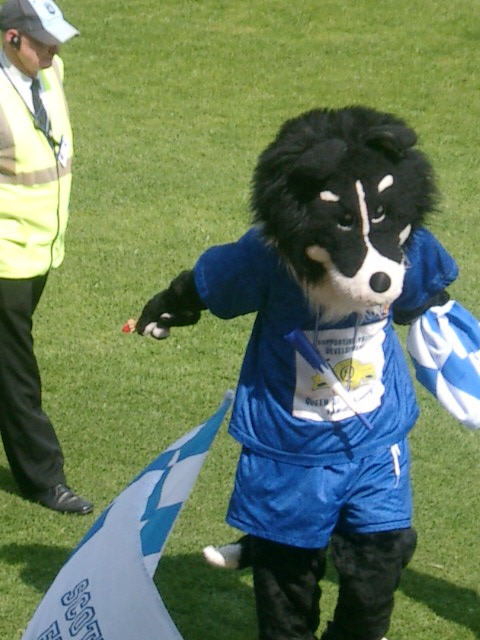
Dougie Doonhamer at Palmerston Park for the celebration of the 2007–08 Queens run to the Scottish Cup Final.

The club mascot is 'Dougie Doonhamer', a human-sized Border Collie dog. The character has been played for many years by local supermarket worker Brian Harkness.

On 25 August 2017, Dougie Doonhamer won the Ladbrokes SPFL mascot race at Hamilton Park, having been runner-up the previous year.

On 31 August 2018, Dougie Doonhamer won the Ladbrokes SPFL mascot race at Hamilton Park for the second consecutive year.

=== Biblical references ===
Queen of the South are often humorously cited as the only league club in the United Kingdom to be mentioned in the Bible. Luke 11:31 states "The Queen of the South shall rise up at the judgment with the men of this generation and condemn them..." Queen of the South is similarly quoted under Matthew 12:42. In the biblical quote the "Queen of the South" is considered to be the Queen of Sheba. In 2005, the issue was investigated by The Guardian website in their series "The Knowledge", which also found full references to Arsenal, Bury and Reading, as well as partial references to "hearts", "wolves", "forest", "hammer", "spurs" and "man's field".

== Honours ==
National League Competitions Division 2 – Champions 1950–51, 2001–02, 2012–13; Runners-up 1932–33, 1961–62, 1974–75, 1980–81, 1985–86

Division 3 – Runners-up 1924–25

National Cup Competitions

Scottish League Challenge Cup – Winners 2002–03, 2012–13; Runners-up 1997–98, 2010–11

Scottish Qualifying Cup – Winners 1923–24

Scottish Cup – Runners-up 2007–08

B.P. Youth Cup – Runners-up 1985–86

Invitational Tournaments

1936 Algiers Invitational Tournament – Winners

Border Cup – Winners 1991–92, 1992–93

Scottish Brewers Cup – Winners 2000–01, 2001–02, 2006–07

Regional League Competitions

Scottish League South and West (Wartime League) – Runners-up 1939–40

Western League – Champions 1922–23

Southern Counties League – Winners 1996–97

Regional Cup Competitions (Reserve squad)

Southern Counties Charity Cup – Winners 1920–24, 1926, 1930–32, 1934, 1937

Southern Counties Cup – Winners 1921, 1924, 1935, 1936, 1962, 1966, 1972, 1976, 1982, 1983, 1987, 1988, 1991, 1997, 2003, 2004

Southern Counties League Cup – Winners 1996–97

Southern Counties Consolation Cup – Winners 1922

Potts Cup – Winners 1921, 1960, 1961

Individual Awards

PFA Scotland Manager of the Year Award – Allan Johnston 2012–13

PFA Second Division Player of the Year Award – Jimmy Robertson 1980–81, Andy Thomson 1991–92, 1993–94, John O'Neill 2001–02, Nicky Clark 2012–13

Bell's SFL Fan of the Season Award – Ian Black 2003–04

SFL Phenomenal Achievement Awards

Recognition of Queens' remarkable Scottish Cup run – Gordon Chisholm 2007–08

Second Division Player of the Year Award – Nicky Clark 2012–13

SFL Goalkeeper of the Season Award – Lee Robinson 2012–13

SFL Second Division Manager of the Year Award – John Connolly 2001–02, Allan Johnston 2012–13

Ginger Boot Award – Nicky Clark 2012–13

Bell's SFL Angels Award – 2003–04

SFL Team of the Season Award – 2012–13

== Records ==
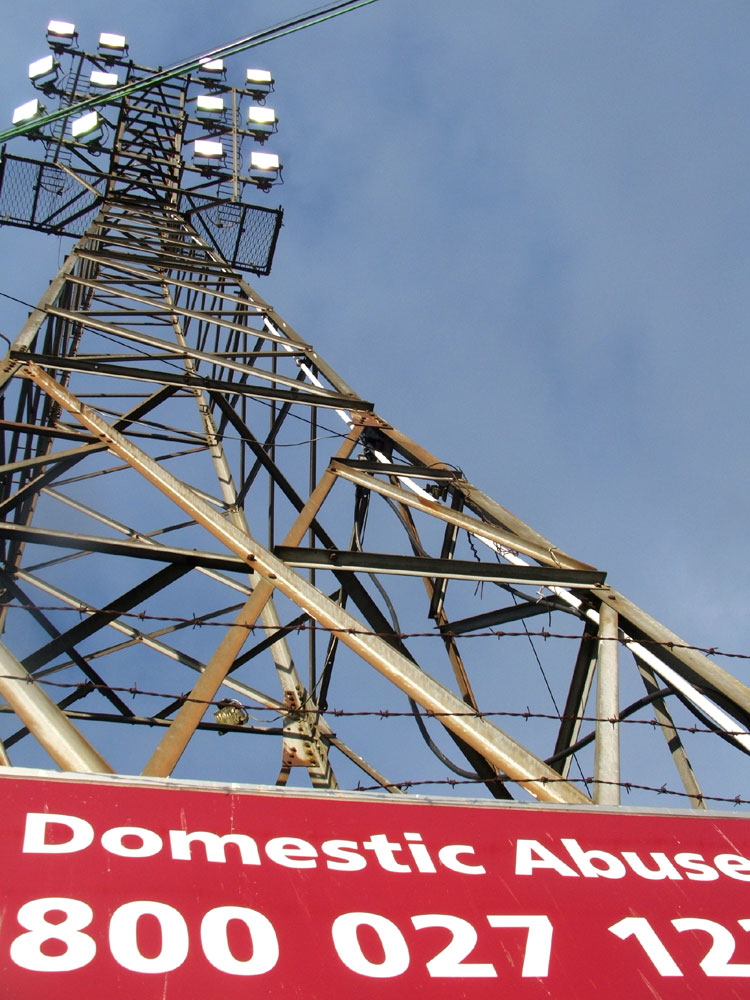
One of Palmerston's record-breaking floodlights

Record victory: 11–1 versus Stranraer; Scottish Cup; 16 January 1932
*10–0 versus Bo'ness; Division Two; 1 October 1932
*This match was later declared void after Bo'ness were expelled from the Scottish Football League.

Record defeat: 10–2 versus Dundee at Dens Park; Attendance: 10,458; Scottish First Division; 1 December 1962. Queens played for 78 minutes with 10 men after goalkeeper George Farm was injured in the 12th minute and was carried off. Dundee's Alan Gilzean scored 7 of the goals. Dundee were the reigning Division One Champions and would make the European Cup semi-finals that season where they lost to the eventual winners AC Milan.

Record home attendance: 26,552 versus Heart of Midlothian; Scottish Cup 3rd Round; 23 February 1952; Queens 1 Hearts 3

Record home league attendance: 21,142 versus Rangers; 6 October 1962; Queens 0 Rangers 4

Record attendance (any venue): 58,975; 5 April 1950; Hampden Park; 3–0 Scottish Cup semi-final replay defeat to Rangers; 52,924 watched the 1–1 draw with Rangers four days earlier, also at Hampden Park.

Most league points (2 points for a win system): 55; Scottish Division 2; 1985–86

Most league points (3 points for a win system): 92; Scottish Division 2; 2012–13

First ever Scottish League Match under floodlights: Rangers versus Queen of the South; Ibrox Park; 7 March 1956; Rangers 8 Queen of the South 0; Rangers player Don Kitchenbrand scored five goals in this match.

Highest free standing floodlights in Scottish football: Queens floodlights were first used on 29 October 1958 and at 85 feet (26 m) high they are the tallest in Scotland. To mark the occasion Preston North End sent a team north for a friendly match.

Highest terrace in Scottish football: Following the trend towards all seater stadia, the height differential between the lowest and highest step on the Portland Drive terrace, records this as the highest remaining terrace in Scottish football.

=== Individuals ===
As of 21 November 2026

All-time Top 20 club appearances
Ranking	Games played	Player's name
1	731	Allan Ball
2	615	Iain McChesney
3	462	Jim Patterson
4	457	Jackie Oakes
5	431	Dougie Sharpe
6	403	Jim Kerr
7	400	Jimmy Robertson
8	381	Roy Henderson
9	369	Willie Savage
10	365	Derek Lyle
11	364	Alan Davidson
12	358	Jim Thomson
13	355	Jocky Dempster
14	346	Bobby Black
15	340	Nobby Clark
16	339	Paul Burns
17	337	Andy Aitken
18	334	George Cloy
19	332	Lex Law
20	321	Crawford Boyd

All-time Top 20 goal scorers
Ranking	Goals	Player's name
1	252	Jim Patterson
2	166	Stephen Dobbie
3	120	Bobby Black
4	117	Derek Lyle
5	114	Andy Thomson
6	98	Jocky Dempster
7	95	Tommy Bryce
8	94	Stevie Mallan
9	93	Tommy McCall
10=	89	Ian Reid
10=	89	Jimmy Robertson
12	81	Jackie Oakes
13	79	Iain McChesney
14	78	Rowan Alexander
15	74	Billy Houliston
16	71	Jackie Law, Sr
17	70	John O'Neill
18	68	Lex Law
19	66	Jimmy Rutherford
20	65	Willie Dougan

Longest serving player: Iain McChesney from 1960 to 1981 (615 appearances and 79 goals)

Record league scorer in a season: Alexander "Jimmy" Gray – 37 goals in the 1927–28 season

Record scorer (all competitions) in a season: Stephen Dobbie - 43 goals in the 2018–19 season

Most capped player: Billy Houliston (3 caps; 1948–49 season; 3–2 v Northern Ireland at Hampden (scoring two goals on his debut in the 30th & 89th minute), 3–1 v England at Wembley and 2–0 v France at Hampden.

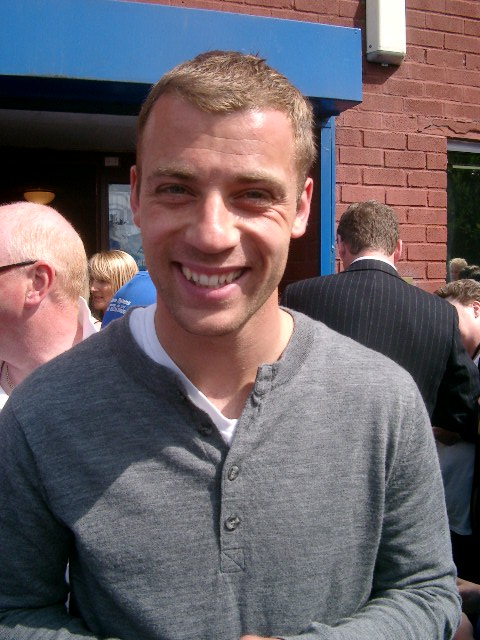
Andy Aitken

First Queens players to earn four senior Scottish football medals while playing for the club: Jim Thomson and Andy Aitken (winners of the 2001–02 Second Division and 2002–03 Scottish Challenge Cup; runners up in the 1997–98 Scottish Challenge Cup and 2007–08 Scottish Cup).

Most decorated Queens player with four winners medals: Derek Lyle (2001–02 & 2012–13 Second Division; 2002–03 & 2012–13 Scottish Challenge Cup)

Record transfer fee received: Andy Thomson; £250,000; Southend United; 1994

Fastest hat-trick: Tommy Bryce; 1 minute 46 seconds Guinness World Records in the 6–0 win versus Arbroath on 18 December 1993. Bryce's hat-trick was recorded in the 8th, 9th & 10th minutes by the match referee Louis Thow. Bryce also scored a fourth goal in this match.

Longest distance goal by an outfield player: Ryan McCann – 84 yards (77 m) in the Scottish Cup Quarter Final 2–0 win versus Dundee on 8 March 2008.

First player to collect the complete set of four senior Scottish football winners medals: Andy Goram when he played in the 2002–03 Scottish Challenge Cup Final 2–0 win for Queens versus Brechin City, to add to his medals haul gathered elsewhere.

Oldest player to play for the club: Ally MacLeod versus St Mirren in the Reserve League West in April 1992. With Queens short of players the manager named himself as a trialist and played the whole 90 minutes. During the second half Queens were awarded a penalty and the former Scotland manager converted the spot kick. The final score was 7–1 to St Mirren and MacLeod received a standing ovation from the small crowd at the end of the game. MacLeod was 61 years old at the time.

=== European record ===
UEFA Cup/Europa League:

Season	Competition	Round	Opponent	Home	Away	Aggregate
2008–09	UEFA Cup	Second Qualifying Round	(Denmark) FC Nordsjælland	1–2	1–2	2–4

== Players ==
=== Current squad ===
As of 21 November 2026

Note: Flags indicate national team as defined under FIFA eligibility rules; some limited exceptions apply. Players may hold more than one non-FIFA nationality.

No.	Pos.	Nation	Player
1	GK	TUR	Deniz Mehmet
2	DF	SCO	Caleb Goldie
3	MF	ENG	Taylor Charters
4	MF	ENG	Jack Stott
5	DF	SCO	Chris McQueen
6	DF	ENG	Jack Hannah
7	MF	SCO	Liam Smith
8	MF	SCO	Zander MacKenzie
9	FW	SCO	Connor Young
10	FW	SCO	Nicky Clark
11	FW	SCO	Brodie Dair (on loan from Fulham)
12	DF	SCO	Shaun Want (captain)
14	MF	SCO	Ben Johnstone
15	DF	SCO	Niall Rogerson
16	MF	USA	Cole Coughlin (co-operation loan with Kilmarnock)

No.	Pos.	Nation	Player
17	DF	SCO	Ruari Ellis (co-operation loan with Kilmarnock)
18	MF	SCO	Aaron Davis (co-operation loan with Kilmarnock)
19	MF	GLP	Benjamin Luissint
20	DF	SCO	Zander Hutton (on loan from Rangers)
25	FW	SCO	Billy Gray
26	MF	SCO	Ben Morton
27	MF	SCO	Josh Kelly
28	FW	ENG	Kurtis Guthrie
29	MF	SCO	Joe Thomson
30	DF	SCO	Lincoln Newell
31	MF	SCO	Anthony Harris
32	MF	SCO	Rocco McColm
34	GK	SCO	Shaun Petry
36	DF	SCO	Mitchell Spence (co-operation loan with Kilmarnock)

- For recent transfers, see 2026–27 Queen of the South F.C. season.

=== Notable players ===
- For all former Queen of the South players with a Wikipedia article, see Category:Queen of the South F.C. players.

The following players were inducted into Queen of the South's Hall of Fame on 29 October 2011, 19 January 2013 and 24 October 2015 respectively.

The following players were inducted into Queen of the South's Hall of Fame on 23 March 2019.

Note: Flags indicate national team as defined under FIFA eligibility rules; some limited exceptions apply. Players may hold more than one non-FIFA nationality.

No.	Pos.	Nation	Player
—	GK	ENG	Allan Ball
—	FW	SCO	Bobby Black
—	MF	SCO	Tommy Bryce
—	MF	SCO	Paul Burns
—	MF	SCO	Jocky Dempster
—	FW	SCO	Stephen Dobbie
—	GK	SCO	Roy Henderson
—	FW	SCO	Billy Houliston
—	DF	SCO	Jim Kerr

No.	Pos.	Nation	Player
—	FW	SCO	Derek Lyle
—	DF	SCO	Iain McChesney
—	DF	SCO	Billy McLaren
—	FW	SCO	Jackie Oakes
—	FW	SCO	Jim Patterson
—	FW	SCO	Jimmy Robertson
—	FW	SCO	Andy Thomson
—	DF	SCO	Jim Thomson

The following players are listed on the club's official website as 'Queens Legends':

Note: Flags indicate national team as defined under FIFA eligibility rules; some limited exceptions apply. Players may hold more than one non-FIFA nationality.

No.	Pos.	Nation	Player
—	DF	SCO	Andy Aitken
—	GK	ENG	Allan Ball
—	DF	SCO	Jimmy Binning
—	FW	SCO	Bobby Black
—	DF	SCO	Crawford Boyd
—	FW	ENG	Ivor Broadis
—	MF	SCO	Tommy Bryce
—	DF	SCO	Nobby Clark
—	MF	SCO	George Cloy
—	GK	SCO	Alan Davidson
—	FW	SCO	Jocky Dempster
—	FW	SCO	Ian Dickson
—	GK	SCO	George Farm
—	MF	SCO	Willie Ferguson
—	FW	SCO	Hughie Gallacher
—	FW	SCO	Dave Halliday

No.	Pos.	Nation	Player
—	FW	SCO	George Hamilton
—	GK	SCO	Roy Henderson
—	FW	SCO	Billy Houliston
—	DF	SCO	Jim Kerr
—	FW	SCO	Lex Law
—	FW	SCO	Neil Martin
—	DF	SCO	Iain McChesney
—	FW	SCO	Ted McMinn
—	FW	SCO	Jackie Oakes
—	FW	SCO	Jim Patterson
—	FW	SCO	Jimmy Robertson
—	DF	SCO	Willie Savage
—	DF	SCO	Dougie Sharpe
—	FW	SCO	Andy Thomson
—	DF	SCO	Jim Thomson

== Managers ==
- Committee Members (1919–1921)
- Joe Dodds (P/C) (1922–1923)
- Board of Directors (1924–1927)
- Alex Wright (1928–1931)
- Board of Directors (1932–1934)
- George McLachlan (1935–1937)
- Willie Ferguson (1937–1938)
- Jimmy McKinnell Senior (1938–1946)
- Jimmy McKinnell Junior (1946–1961)
- George Farm (1961–1964)
- Board of Directors (1964–1965)
- Bobby Shearer (P/C) (1965–1966)
- Jackie Husband (1967–1968)
- Board of Directors (1968–1970)
- Harold Davis (1970–1971)
- Jim Easton (P/M) (1971–1973)
- Willie McLean (1973–1975)
- Mike Jackson (1975–1978)
- Willie Hunter (1978–1979)
- Billy Little (1979–1980)
- George Herd (1980–1981)
- Harry Hood (1981–1982)
- Drew Busby (P/M) (1982–1984)
- Nobby Clark (1984–1986)
- Mike Jackson (1986–1987)
- Davie Wilson (1987–1988)
- Tommy McGinn (1988-1989)
- Billy McLaren (1989–1990)
- Frank McGarvey (P/M) (1990–1991)
- Ally MacLeod (1991–1992)
- Derek Frye (P/C) (1992–1993)
- Billy McLaren^{2} (1993–1996)
- Rowan Alexander & Mark Shanks (1996–1999)
- George Rowe & Ken Eadie (1999–2000)
- John Connolly (2000–2004)
- Iain Scott (2004–2005)
- Ian McCall (2005–2007)
- Gordon Chisholm (2007–2010)
- Kenny Brannigan (2010–2011)
- Gus MacPherson (2011–2012)
- Allan Johnston (P/M) (2012–2013)
- Jim McIntyre (2013–2014)
- James Fowler (P/M) (2014 – March 2016)
- Gavin Skelton (P/M) (April 2016 – November 2016)
- Gary Naysmith (December 2016 – 4 May 2019)
- Allan Johnston^{2} (5 May 2019 – 13 February 2022)
- Willie Gibson (P/M) (14 February 2022 – 21 December 2022)
- Marvin Bartley (7 January 2023 – 4 May 2024)
- Peter Murphy (9 May 2024 – 11 May 2026)
- Nicky Clark (P/M) (25 May 2026 – Present)

P/C = Player-Coach P/M = Player-Manager

^{2} Second Spell

== Staff ==
=== Board of directors ===
- Chairman: Billy Hewitson
- Vice-chairman: Craig Paterson
- Chief executive officer: Dan Armstrong
- Honorary directors: Norman Blount and Davie Rae

=== Coaching staff ===
- Manager: Nicky Clark
- Assistant manager: Sandy Clark
- First team coach: George Paterson
- Goalkeeping coach: Vacant
- Physiotherapist: Tammy McWhirter
- Club doctor: Dr Ross Hunter
- Groundsman: Kevin McCormick
- Kitman: Graeme Dalgleish
- Head of youth: Andy Irving
- Youth coaches: David Mathieson, Neil Murray, Ross Newlands
