= Nobby Clark (footballer) =

Scottish footballer and manager

Personal information
- Full name: Robert Clark
- Date of birth: 12 April 1950 (age 76)
- Place of birth: Glasgow, Scotland
- Position: Defender

Youth career
- Sighthill Amateurs

Senior career*
Years	Team	Apps	(Gls)
1969–1975	Partick Thistle	97	(1)
1975–1984	Queen of the South	276	(6)
Total		373	(7)

Managerial career
- 1984–1986: Queen of the South
- 1986–1987: Stranraer
- * Club domestic league appearances and goals

Robert "Nobby" Clark (born 12 April 1950) is a Scottish former professional footballer who played for Partick Thistle and then served Queen of the South as both player and manager.

== Playing career ==
With Partick Thistle, Clark scored a single goal in a 1–1 draw against Rangers. He played in the club's 1972 UEFA Cup campaign. He was inducted into the club's 'Hall of Fame' in 2009 for his part in the 1971 Scottish League Cup Final-winning campaign, when all players who contributed to that victory were recognised. In total Clark played 154 games for Partick Thistle (including Scottish Football League, Scottish Cup, League Cup, Glasgow Cup and UEFA Cup fixtures).

As a defensive cornerstone from 1975 until 1984, Clark made 276 league appearances and scored six goals for Queen of the South, (340 first team appearances in all, placing him fourteenth in ranking of games played in their history). Jimmy Robertson was later interviewed by the club, and named Clark as being one of the best players that he played alongside at Palmerston Park.

== Managerial and coaching career ==
Clark went on to be the manager of Queen of the South when he stopped playing at the end of the 1983-84 season for two years. It was during this time that he signed Tommy Bryce for the Dumfries club. Clark is the only person to gain promotion with Queens as a player and then go on to repeat the feat as manager.

Clark left to manage Stranraer at the start of the 1986-87 season. He was in charge at Stair Park until November 1987, when he was replaced as manager by "Sanny" McAnespie.

In 2001 Clark, joined Motherwell as a youth coach and first team opposition scout. He served managers Eric Black, Terry Butcher, Maurice Malpas, Mark McGhee and Jim Gannon before leaving to join up with McGhee at Aberdeen in 2009, and continued to work at the club carrying out first team opposition reports for managers Craig Brown and Derek McInnes over the next decade.
