= Allan Ball =

English footballer (1943–2018)

Personal information
- Date of birth: 26 February 1943
- Place of birth: Hetton-le-Hole, City of Sunderland, England
- Date of death: 21 July 2018 (aged 75)
- Position: Goalkeeper

Senior career*
Years	Team	Apps	(Gls)
1963–1982	Queen of the South	579	(0)
- Gretna
- Dalbeattie Star
- * Club domestic league appearances and goals

Allan Ball (26 February 1943 – 21 July 2018) was an English footballer. Born in Hetton-le-Hole in County Durham, Ball played as a goalkeeper, spending most of his professional career with Scottish club Queen of the South in Dumfries. Ball made a club record 731 competitive first team appearances for the Doonhamers between 1963 and 1982. Ball also briefly played for Bishop Auckland, Stanley United and Gretna. In later years he was an Honorary Director at Queen of the South.

== Playing career ==
Ball played outfield as an inside left as a youngster before he was handed the green jersey when the Durham County Schools goalkeeper, future FA Cup winner Jimmy Montgomery with Sunderland, was injured during a match.

As a 15-year-old, Ball deputised four times for Harry Sharratt at Bishop Auckland. Ball doubled his weekly income from working at South Hetton in the coal mine as a pit electrician by signing for Stanley United.

=== Queen of the South ===
In 1963, Ball signed for Queen of the South for £100. Ball was signed in the early hours of the morning after finishing his shift down the coal mine. Ball joined Queens first eleven team that featured all-time leading goalscorer for Queens, Jim Patterson, right winger Ernie Hannigan and fellow long servants Iain McChesney and Jim Kerr.

After Ball signed, goalkeeper and then player-manager George Farm promptly dropped himself to give Allan Ball his Queens debut on 14 December 1963 in a home 6–3 defeat to Falkirk. Retained for the visit of Celtic two weeks later, Ball played once more despite the Doonhamers losing the game 2–0.

Allan Ball made 819 Queen of the South appearances, including 507 matches consecutively and was only once shown a yellow card, on 25 December, by referee Tiny Wharton, who went on to open Queens new East Stand in 1995. Ball quoted: "I'd said something about Jesus Christ so I was booked for blasphemy on Christmas Day."

Ball's performance in the 1975–76 Scottish League Cup quarter-final first leg match versus Rangers at Ibrox Park limited the Govan club to a narrow 1–0 victory. A 2–1 win for Queens in the second leg at Palmerston Park had the tie going to extra-time after the 2–2 aggregate score. Jocky Dempster was one of the Queens scorers on the night but Rangers scored a winner in extra-time to progress in the competition.

In the 1975–76 Scottish Cup, Ball saved a penalty with a broken ankle in the 2–2 draw at Somerset Park in the fourth round versus Ayr United and did not feature in the 5–4 replay win.

Season 1980–81, with Ball as the Queens goalkeeper, the club were promoted from the Second Division into the First Division. Also in the first eleven were fellow long servants Iain McChesney, Crawford Boyd and Jimmy Robertson, along with future Queens manager Rowan Alexander.

Ball's long-time service as Queens goalkeeper was rewarded with two testimonials, the first versus Carlisle United in 1971 and the second in 1984 versus Manchester City. Danny McGrain, Davie Cooper, Gary Mackay and Rowan Alexander all guested for Queens in the testimonial match versus the Sky Blues.

=== Gretna ===
After leaving Palmerston, Ball played for Gretna and briefly for Dalbeattie Star.

== Life after football and death ==
Ball went on to be a successful motor dealer in Dumfries.

On 11 December 2001, Queens announced that Ball was now an Honorary Director at the club, a position that he held until his death.

Ball died on 21 July 2018, aged 75.
