= Iain McChesney =

Scottish footballer (1944–2024)

Personal information
- Date of birth: 29 July 1944
- Date of death: 29 March 2024 (aged 79)
- Position: Utility player

Youth career
- Kello Rovers

Senior career*
| Years | Team | Apps | (Gls) |
| 1960–1981 | Queen of the South | 483 | (67) |
- * Club domestic league appearances and goals

Iain McChesney (29 July 1944 – 29 March 2024) was a Scottish professional footballer with Scottish Football League club Queen of the South from Dumfries. McChesney is the longest serving player in the club's history, playing with them from 1960 to 1981. McChesney was a utility player.

== Playing career ==
McChesney showed great dedication and commitment to the club. The defender played his first game at 16 years old and is the club's longest serving player. McChesney made 615 appearances between 1960 and 1981. McChesney is second in the club's record appearances list behind Allan Ball. McChesney is also 13th highest in Queens all-time goalscoring charts with 79 goals, one ahead of Rowan Alexander.

McChesney was signed for the Palmerston Park club by manager Jimmy McKinnell, Jr. in July 1960 from Kello Rovers. Others on the playing staff already were Jim Patterson, Ivor Broadis, George Farm and Jim Kerr. Others to soon join were future Scotland centre forward Neil Martin, right winger Ernie Hannigan (like Martin, Hannigan went on to play in England's top division9 and goalkeeper Allan Ball. This was the best side of McChesney's two decades at the club winning promotion to Scotland's top flight and playing there for two seasons. Queens notched a league victory at Celtic Park during season 1962–63.

McChesney scored for Queens on 26 March 1970 in the first ever game when Queens played overseas opposition at Palmerston. Metalist Kharkiv of Ukraine, at the time part of the U.S.S.R., were the opponents with Queens winning the challenge game 2–0. This was Queens' first game versus overseas opposition since the club's 1936 Overseas tour.

McChesney was awarded a testimonial versus Ayr United in 1971 for his loyalty. Joining McChesney and Ball to play at Palmerston through most of the 1970s was Jocky Dempster.

Queens were promoted to the First Division at the end of the 1980–81 season with McChesney in their ranks. Also in the side were fellow long servants Allan Ball, Crawford Boyd and Jimmy Robertson and future manager Rowan Alexander.

== After playing ==
McChesney retired from playing in 1981 but continued his association with the club as spongeman for a spell and also trainer for the local-based players and was also assistant manager to Billy McLaren.

McChesney became an electrician. As part of maintenance work on the floodlights at Palmerston Park, he was the one who climbed up to change the lightbulbs.

McChesney was inducted into the Queen of the South Hall of Fame on 19 January 2013.

McChesney died on 29 March 2024, at the age of 79.
