= History of Queen of the South F.C. =

UK association football club

Queen of the South Football Club is a Scottish professional football club formed in March 1919 and located in Dumfries. Queen of the South are officially nicknamed The Doonhamers, but usually referred to as Queens or QoS (as listed on the club badge). Their home ground since formation has been Palmerston Park. They joined the Scottish Football League at the start of the 1923–24 season.

The club's national honours include winning the Division B Championship in season 1950–51, the Second Division Championship in the 2001–02 and 2012–13 seasons and also the Scottish Challenge Cup in the 2002–03 and 2012–13 season. Queens led Scotland's top division up until New Year in season 1953–54 and Queens highest finish in Scotland's top division was fourth in season 1933–34. The club reached their first major cup final in 2008 when they reached the final of the Scottish Cup, where they were runners-up to Rangers.

== Formation and early success ==
=== Club name and formation ===
Dumfries got its nickname Queen of the South from David Dunbar, a local poet, who in 1857 stood for Parliament in the General Election. In one of his addresses, he called Dumfries "Queen of the South" and this became synonymous with the town.

Early in 1919, a handful of Dumfries football enthusiasts met in their homes to discuss not only the restoration of competitive football fixtures locally (following the end of the First World War) but also the formation, through amalgamation, of a local football club to compete at more than a local level.

A public meeting was arranged in Dumfries Town Hall on 21 March 1919 on the proposed merger and representatives were approached by three clubs from Dumfries and Maxwelltown:

- Dumfries F.C.
- 5th Kings Own Scottish Borderers
- (Car manufacturer works side) Arrol-Johnston

Another club, Dumfries Amateurs, declined the invitation to join and the other clubs agreed to the merger. Dumfries Amateurs dissolved in November 1920.

Queen of the South United was agreed upon as the name of the new club, and Palmerston Park, an already established football venue, was chosen as the club's home.

The club held their first formal meeting on 26 March 1919 at 38 Whitesands in Dumfries, at the premises of the New Bazaar public house.

After four trial matches, Queen of the South's (the United extension had been dropped along the way) first-ever game took place on 16 August 1919. Invites were sent to local councillors and magistrates, and the presence of Dumfries Town Band added to the sense of occasion. The opposition was Sanquhar side Nithsdale Wanderers, and the challenge game ended 2–2. Among those who played in this first game was Ian Dickson, who would leave in 1921 to play for Aston Villa.

The club badge contains the same motto as that on the crest for the town of Dumfries: A Lore Burne.

Queen of the South are unrelated to an earlier team named Queen of the South Wanderers that had become defunct in 1894.

=== Early days ===
Queens early seasons were involved in regional set-ups.

Queens first-ever competitive fixture was on 6 September 1919, in the Scottish Qualifying Cup against Thornhill. After a 1–1 draw, Queens went through after a replay, also played at Palmerston. Queens first ever away match and first ever defeat was two rounds later in the Scottish Qualifying Cup, in a replay at Galston.

Very early in their careers, the form of Dave Halliday (1920) and Hughie Gallacher (1921) at Queen of the South proved to be the beginnings of successful careers elsewhere.

Jimmy McKinnell, from Dalbeattie, and Willie McCall and Tom Wylie were sold to Blackburn Rovers around the same time. This, combined with the sale to Aston Villa of Ian Dickson, helped to fund the purchase of Palmerston Park in 1921 for £1,500.

At a regional level, Queens won many cups in the Southern Counties set-up. Playing in the Western League, Queens were runners-up in 1921–22. Queens then created something of a sensation with the signing coup of Joe Dodds from Celtic. With further experience provided on the pitch by ex-Liverpool player Bob McDougall, Queens won the Western League in 1922–23 with a 20-game unbeaten league campaign.

=== Entering the Scottish Football League ===
Queen of the South had applied unsuccessfully to join the Scottish Football League in seasons 1921–22 and 1922–23. The ambition bore fruit in 1923–24, however, when the club were invited to join the SFL at its lowest tier, the newly created Third Division, where Queens finished in third. The club's most notable achievement that season was in the Scottish Qualifying Cup. Then considerably more prestigious than now, Queens brought the cup to the South West for the first time in its 25-year history. In the final replay, a run through the opposition half and shot from Bob McDermid (on loan at Queens from Rangers before going on to captain Aberdeen) opened the scoring. Next, McDermid's "dummy" let Bert Lister in to hit the second. McDermid's left-foot finish sealed the 3–0 win and Queens were crowned cup winners. The train bringing the players and the cup back to Dumfries were met by crowds of jubilant well-wishers on the platforms and surrounding streets and approaches. The team were then entertained at the Town Hall buildings on Buccleuch Street.

Historic table positions of QoS since joining the League.

Goalkeeper Jimmy Coupland signed in 1924 and made his debut aged 16. Queens first tangible national league success came in their second competitive season in 1924–25, finishing second behind Nithsdale Wanderers to gain promotion to the Second Division.

1926–27 saw Queens drawn competitively for the first time against Old Firm opposition. Queens took eventual winners Celtic to a replay before being eliminated from the Scottish Cup. Among those playing for Queens was inside left Billy Halliday, brother of Dave Halliday. The 21-year-old's nine goals in fifteen games that season saw Newcastle United offer him a contract. With the offer of higher wages and a signing-on fee, plus his brother's success as a goalscorer at nearby Sunderland, he signed. At Newcastle he joined Hughie Gallacher, who had captained the Geordies to the 1926–27 English League Championship.

1931–32 was notable for a number of reasons. Centre-forward Jimmy Rutherford hit what remains the record number of goals in one season for Queens: 41. The Scottish Cup campaign saw Queens inflict its record senior victory of 11–1. The opposition was south-west rivals Stranraer, whose goal was the last of the twelve scored. In the next round, Queens took First Division club Dundee United to two replays before being eliminated.

In 1932 Coupland was injured and was replaced by John Smith. Willie Savage joined the same year (he make would make 369 appearances for Queens). Willie Culbert also joined in 1932, and with Savage he would form the club's full-back partnership for years to come. Left winger Tommy McCall broke the national record of goals scored in a season from his position, scoring 32 goals. Queens ended their 1932–33 league campaign with a 2–1 victory over Second Division champions Hibernian. After consolidating their position in the Second Division over several of the previous seasons, Queen of the South were promoted to the First Division as runners-up. Ten years after entering the national leagues and with two promotions behind them, the club was ready for top-flight football.

== 1933 to 1966 and top division football ==
=== Top division football ===
From 1933, excluding war-time interruption, Queen of the South spent only one season out of Scotland's top division until 1959. In this period Queen's ability to live with the elite was demonstrated by its results against Celtic. On eighteen visits to Palmerston Park, Celtic managed just five victories. With three games drawn, Queens claimed full points on ten occasions.

=== First Season in the Top Division and Finishing Fourth ===
Willie Ferguson joined Queen of the South at the start of 1933–34 season (after four years as a Queens player, Ferguson would become manager). In its first-ever game in the top division, a Queens team featuring Smith in goal, and Savage, Culbert and Ferguson playing outfield, Queens condemned Celtic to a 3–2 defeat. The Sunday Mail headline read, "Queen's brew hot stew, Celtic merely the gravy". The Celtic match programme the week after said, "We would be failing in our duty as Celts and as sportsmen if we omitted to congratulate Queen of the South on their victory over us. And we hope they will continue to serve up good, honest football which brought them their first victory in the league."

That season of 1933–34 saw the club's highest-ever league finish, with fourth place in Scotland's top flight. Irish international Laurie Cumming scored 24 goals that season. Centre half Adam Allan and winger and local player Willie Anderson would also figure prominently. Among the scalps Queens took that season were double victories over Celtic, Hibs and Hearts. Queens reached the Scottish Cup quarter finals before losing to two deflected goals away to St Johnstone.

=== 1936 Overseas tour and Algiers Invitational Tournament ===
In 1935, George McLachlan became Queen of the South manager (as well as playing in Scotland and in the 1927 FA Cup win with Cardiff City his experience included over 100 games for Manchester United and a spell with French side Le Havre). In May 1936 he took Queens on an eleven-game tour to France, Luxembourg and Algeria. In France it played against such teams as Montpellier HSC (losing 4–2) and Stade Reims (winning 5–4).

The tour included competing in a four team invitational tournament in Algiers. With Algeria then under French colonial rule the official programme listed the venue as "Stade-Velodrome Municipal d'Alger" and the participants as:

Le Queen of the South- La Belle Equipe Ecossaise de Première Division

Racing-Club de Santander- Favori des Championnats d'Espagne

Floriana F. C. de Malte- Champion Officiel et Vainqueur de la Coupe

R.U.A.- Champion de l'Afrique du Nord 1935

The match days were 21 May and 24 May.

Home side Racing Universitaire d'Alger (R.U.A. for whom Nobel Prize winning author-philosopher Albert Camus had played in goals for its junior team) had already won both the North African Champions Cup and the North African Cup in the 1930s (R.U.A. would win each twice by the decade's end). Goals by Willie Thomson and Joe Tulip (the Northumbrian was one of the first Englishmen to play in the Scottish League) saw Queens book a place in the invitational tournament final with a 2–1 victory against them.

In the final Queens faced a Racing de Santander side who had just finished 4th in Spain's La Liga notching home and away double victories against both Real Madrid and F.C. Barcelona. Norrie Haywood's goal and a 1–0 scoreline saw victory for La Belle Equipe Ecossaise. The trophy can still be seen in Queens club museum today.

=== Late 1930s ===
On the back of league wins against Dundee and Hibs, on 30 January 1937 captained by Savage, with Willie Fotheringham in goal and with Culbert, Allan, Cumming, Tulip and Jackie Law, Sr also playing, Queen of the South condemned Rangers to a 1–0 first round Scottish Cup exit. The Evening Times reported, "It was more than a merited win for Queen of the South. It was a triumph".

Winger Jackie Oakes signed in 1936 from Wolverhampton Wanderers (he would eventually leave for Blackburn Rovers in 1947). 1937–38 at Ibrox Park was the first season when Queens condemned Rangers to a league defeat. In 1938 Pat Fitzsimmons signed from Preston North End and original board member Jimmy McKinnell Senior became secretary/manager until retiring in 1946. Tommy Lang signed after his successful career down South including spells with Newcastle United (1932 F.A. Cup winner), Huddersfield Town and Manchester United. James Mathieson also signed to give Queens a highly experienced goalkeeper with experience of top flight football in Scotland & England. Queens hit the Scottish Football League top spot for the first time in 1938–39 and finished the season in sixth place.

In 1939–40, after 5 games with Queens in ninth place, the league was abandoned, after war was declared in Europe. Scottish football was then restructured into a regionalised two league set up with an East and a West league. Queens played in the West League. The new League started on 21 October 1939.

=== 1940s ===
At the end of 1939–40 Queen of the South finished as runners up to Rangers in the West league. Queens never played another league game until the war in Europe was over. The national league resumed in 1946–47 with Queens retaining its place in the top division.

Freddie Jenkins joined in 1947 and in 1949 was transferred to Chelsea for a record fee of £10,000. 1947–48 was the first season Queens would register league victories against both of the Old Firm in the same season.

Wales, Leeds United and Juventus legend John Charles made his first team debut for Leeds United in a friendly versus Queens on 19 April 1949. The score was 0–0, crowd 20,000. The same year on 15 October saw the collective debut of Hibs' 'famous five' forward line of Gordon Smith, Bobby Johnstone, Lawrie Reilly, Eddie Turnbull and Willie Ormond. Queens were defeated 2–0.

=== 1949–50 and various Scottish Cup runs ===
Queen of the South have made it to the Scottish Cup quarter-finals on numerous occasions. Only once in the 20th century did they progress beyond this stage. That was in 1950 when they knocked out Aberdeen 2–1 away after a replay, as the first match at home was a 3–3 draw. After a 1–1 draw in the semi-final, Queens were knocked out 3–0 by Rangers after a replay. Both semi-finals were played at Hampden Park in Glasgow.

In 18 Scottish Cups played between 1938–39 and 1962–63 Queens reached the quarter-finals six times. The most memorable of the five of these that resulted in defeat was in 1962–63. Dundee United required two replays to see Queens off after the first two games ended 1–1.

=== 1950s and Queens best ===
The Scottish cup run to the semi-final was balanced by the disappointment of Queen of the South's first ever league relegation. 1950–51 saw Queens rule the Scottish B Division when promoted straight back to the top flight as champions clinching the title by winning away at Forfar. Queens also reached the semi-final of the Scottish League Cup. The championship trophy was presented to then captain and rugged centre half Willie Aird at the start of the next season. In that same 1951–52 season the Doonhamers would hand Celtic a 4–0 thrashing.

The early and mid-1950s saw the club's most successful spell to date achieving regular mid table finishes in the Scottish A Division (as the top flight was then called). Queens were managed throughout this period by Jimmy McKinnell Junior. On 23 February 1952 Palmerston Park saw its record attendance of 26,552 for the Scottish Cup visit of Hearts.

This was the era at the club of goalkeeper Roy Henderson, full back Dougie Sharpe, and until July 1952 Dumfries boy and centre-forward Billy Houliston. Centre forward Jackie Brown debuted in January 1947 (in season 1953–54 he would score 4 hat tricks). Dougie McBain replaced Fitzsimmons and gave 7 years from 1948. Jim Patterson signed in 1949 (251 strikes for the club make Jim Patterson the all-time goals king of Queens). Inside forward and play maker Walter Rothera joined the club in 1951 as did full back Jimmy Binning, left half Jimmy Greenock and Jackie Oakes returned this time from Manchester City. Centre-half Alex Smith and goal scoring outside right Bobby Black (another local boy) did the same in 1952. Black is the club's 2nd highest scorer with 120 goals. Charlie Johnstone played until 1953 before retiring aged 41. At different levels whilst at Queens, Houliston, Sharp, Patterson, Binning and Black would represent Scotland internationally. Henderson was selected 6 times as Scotland reserve goalkeeper. Queens topped Scotland's highest division until Christmas in season 1953–54. Same season league defeats were given again to both of the Old Firm in 1953–54 and 1955–56 by killer Queens. The solidity of Queens results through this period peaked in 1955–56 when after again leading the top division early in the season it finished in sixth place, a finish surpassed only once in the club's history. For Queens fans this was the time of the beautiful South.

Queens were subsequently relegated from the top division in 1959.

=== Early and mid 1960s ===
In February 1960 ex-Scotland and long-time Blackpool FA Cup winning goalkeeper George Farm signed for Queen of the South. Another ex-international, England's Ivor Broadis had already joined at the start of that season.

Queens made it to the League Cup semi-final in 1960–61 for the second and to date last time. Farm was made player manager in 1961. Fast and tricky right winger, Ernie Hannigan (he later said, "Going to Queen of the South turned out to be a great move"), and future Scotland centre forward Neil Martin (44 goals in 78 Queens games), joined in '61 and formed a partnership (they would later play together in England's top division with Coventry City). With Jim Patterson still at Queens the club were promoted back to the top division in 1962 where it played again for two seasons (beating Celtic at Parkhead in 1962–63). Queens have not played top division football since 1963–64.

Two players signed for Queens in the early 1960s who gave greater service than any other player. With a combined service of four decades and over 1,400 games between them, these players are Allan Ball and Ian McChesney. Billy Collings, Jim Kerr and brothers Jackie Law, Jr and Lex Law were also 1960s mainstays. Queen's keenly contested promotion to the top flight in 1964–65 and 1965–66 but missed out by one place by finishing 3rd on both occasions.

== Harkness era ==
Willie Harkness was appointed Queen of the South chairman in 1967.

A second-place finish in 1974–75 failed to carry the significance of previous seasons due to league restructure meaning the top 6 clubs would play in the 2nd of 3 divisions the next season (instead of providing promotion to the top tier as had been the case before). 1970s long servants Jocky Dempster and Crawford Boyd were by now well established at Queens.

Two seasons later in 1976–77 by finishing 9th in a 12 team second flight makes this one of only two season in the Harkness era when Queens finished in the upper half of the Scottish league (placing them 19th out of 38 clubs as there were then).

Queens were promoted as runners up of the third of three divisions in 1980–81 (winger Jimmy Robertson was divisional player of the year) and in 1985–86. However both visits to the middle division were short (one season and three seasons respectively). 1987–88 seen Queens second and last Harkness era finish in the top half of the Scottish League ladder when finishing 7th out of 12 in the middle division (placing them 19th out of 38 clubs). Along with Robertson the other outstanding long servants of the 1980s were George Cloy and Alan Davidson. Nobby Clark played in the 1981 promotion season and was manager for the promotion in 1986.

In 1970–71 and 1972–73 11th-place finishes in the lower division meant Queens finished 9th bottom of 37 teams in the Scottish league ladder. In finishing second bottom in the lowest division in 1979–80 only Alloa Athletic that season prevented Queens finishing bottom of the entire Scottish football league ladder. From 1982–83 to 1984–85 Queens finished in 8th bottom, 9th bottom and 7th bottom. More abject league finishes followed; the sequence from 1989–90 to 1992–93 was 5th bottom, 3rd bottom, 4th bottom and 5th bottom of the Scottish football league pile. The 7 times when Queens have finished in Scotland's bottom 8 were all in the Harkness era. Of the 4 finishes of 9th bottom place, 3 of these were in the Harkness era with the other being in the 1920s within 5 years of Queens joining the Scottish league.

Cup highlights in the Harkness era were also scarce. Queens had two runs to the Scottish Cup quarter-finals. These were in 1975–76 (including an Allan Ball penalty save with torn ankle ligaments in the away 2–2 fourth round draw with Ayr United before the 5–4 replay victory), and 1976–77. In the 1990–91 Scottish Cup Queens were knocked out at home to then non-league Ross County in a 2nd round replay conceding 6 goals to 2. Two seasons later (again in the second round) Queens went out to non-league opposition again this time losing 2–1 away to Huntly. In 1993–94 Queens conceded 8 goals to Forfar in the 1st round exit (scoring 3 in reply).

The lowest recorded attendance for a competitive Queens match at Palmerston Park is 300 on 4 May 1974. Alloa Athletic were the league opponents in an end of season game that Queens won 1–0.

The finest footballer from Dumfries of his generation, Davie Irons, was an unrecognised talent at Queens. Queens were Irons' side for one year where he played three first-team games. He moved in 1980 into junior football with Kello Rovers. Irons returned to the senior game and included playing premier league football in Scotland in a respected playing career spanning 26 years. Irons scored the opening goal for Dunfermline in the game that confirmed Queen's relegation in 1989.

Ian McCall in his boyhood was a regular on the Palmerston terraces. His hopes of playing for the club were dashed, though, by then chairman Willie Harkness. "I played a trial game for the club, and thought I did reasonably well," McCall recalls. "Drew Busby was the manager, but I was told by Willie Harkness I might not make the grade. Instead (in 1983) I went to Queen's Park, and then three years after that was sold to Rangers for £250,000."

More talent slipped unnoticed through the club in the shape of Bernie Slaven. The young Slaven played two first team games as a trialist for Queens in 1983–84. Slaven's next club was Albion Rovers with whom he would score 31 goals in season 1984–85. From Rovers Slaven went to Middlesbrough in October 1985 where he notched 146 goals in 381 games over eight seasons. He was part of the Republic of Ireland squad for the 1990 World Cup.

In 1984 Queens exceeded its previous highest transfer fee received with £100,000 for Ted McMinn.

In December 1993 Tommy Bryce of Queens scored a hat-trick against Arbroath in a period of 1 minute, 46 seconds, earning him a place in the Guinness Book of Records. In February 1994 Bryce hit another hat-trick, this time against Dumbarton in a time of 3 and a half minutes. In both games Bryce hit four goals.

The control of Queen of the South Football Club by Willie Harkness ended on 14 April 1994.

== Rebuilding and revival ==
=== Blount era ===
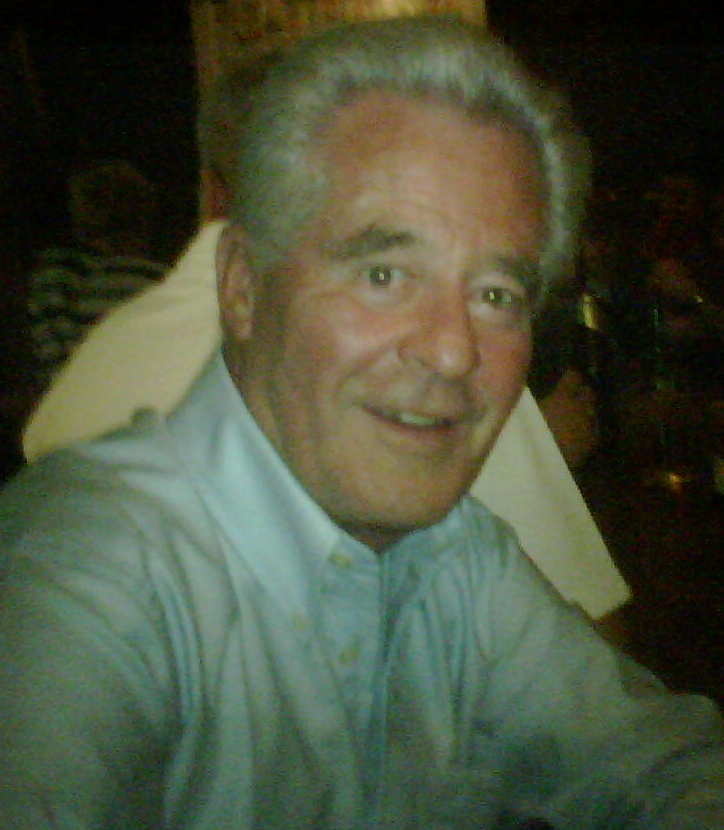
Norman Blount

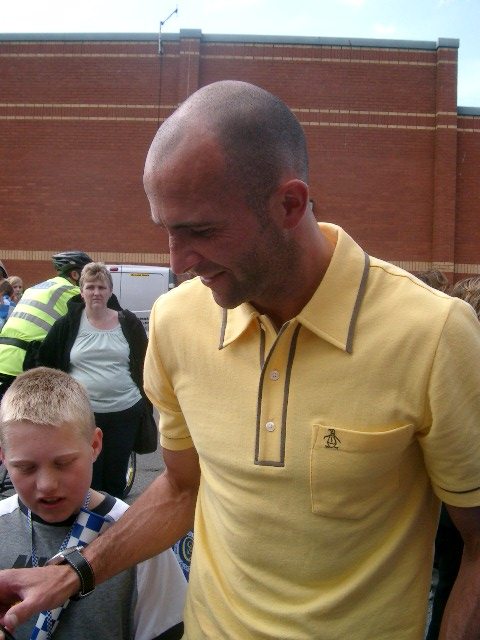
Jim Thomson

New chairman Norman Blount started the ball rolling on dragging Queen of the South into the 21st century. Two time divisional player of the year Andy Thomson was transferred for a club record fee of £250,000 in 1994. As Thomson was to say on his return over a decade later, "Things have changed quite a bit while I've been away — a new stand, a completely new set-up and a more modern type of training system". Thomson added, "Norman Blount was an excellent chairman."

Arriving quickly in the new era was the new stand. Rangers provided the opposition in April 1995 in a game (drawn 2–2) to commemorate the stand opening and also the club's 75th anniversary. Notably among those happy to guest for Queen's new regime were Davie Irons and Ian McCall.

Other ideas quickly came along that showed that the club was in a new era:

- The club became the first senior club in the UK to establish a club museum.
- Queen of the South became the first club in the world to deploy astro turf on the outside of the touch line on a grass pitch (for linesmen to run along). Initially the Scottish Football Association agreed to this as a 12-month experiment. However, such was the success of the astro turf that the SFA brought the experiment to an early close and sanctioned use of this idea for any other club interested.
- The first senior club in the UK to use a lottery scheme to decide the annual shirt sponsor. Such was the success of the idea that the club became inundated with calls from other clubs enquiring on the best way to set such a scheme up.

Queen's have gone on to rebuild some relative success last enjoyed in the pre-Harkness era. In 1997 the club reached the Scottish Challenge Cup final for the first time. Second Division Queen's lost 1–0 to 1st Division Falkirk despite a rousing Queen's display at Motherwell's Fir Park; a performance that included the man of the match award going to Queen's veteran central midfield playmaker Tommy Bryce and an early career appearance for Jamie McAllister. The final witnessed one of the earlier appearances of Jim Thomson and Andy Aitken lining up together in defence. Both have since made over 300 first team appearances for Queen's.

Scenes from the film A Shot at Glory, starring Robert Duvall, Michael Keaton and Brian Cox were shot at Palmerston Park during 1999.

Ronnie Bradford was appointed the new chairman of the football club in November 1999.

=== Bradford and Rae eras ===
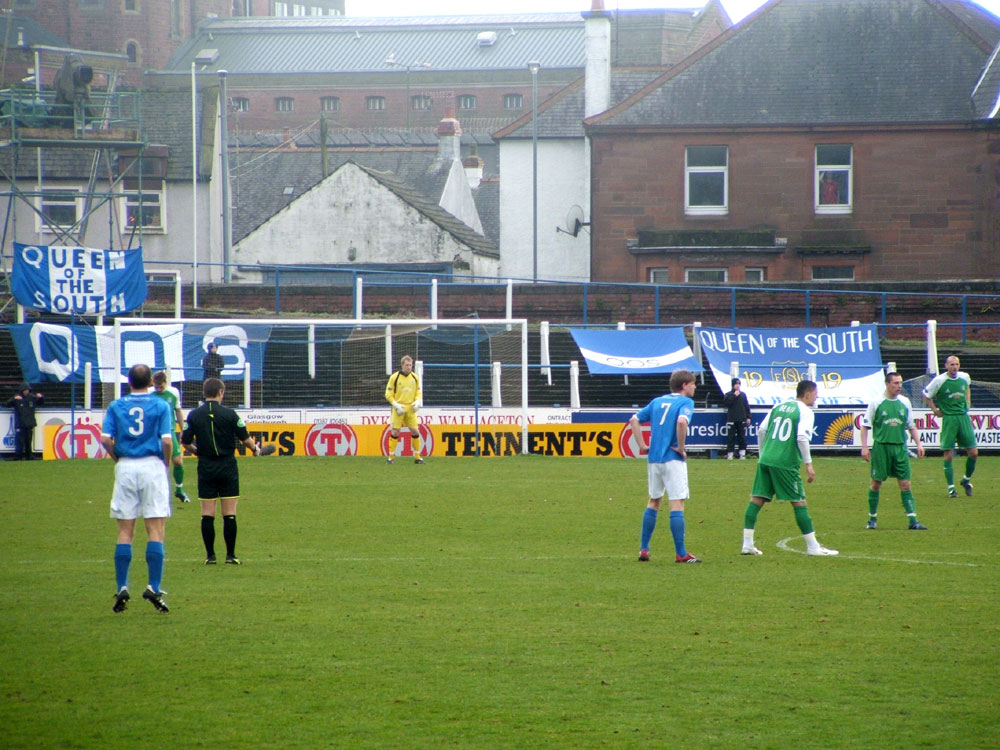
February 2007 against Hibernian F.C.

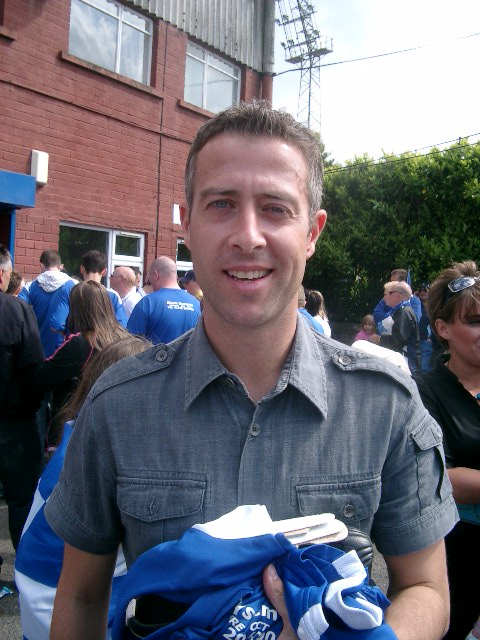
John O'Neill

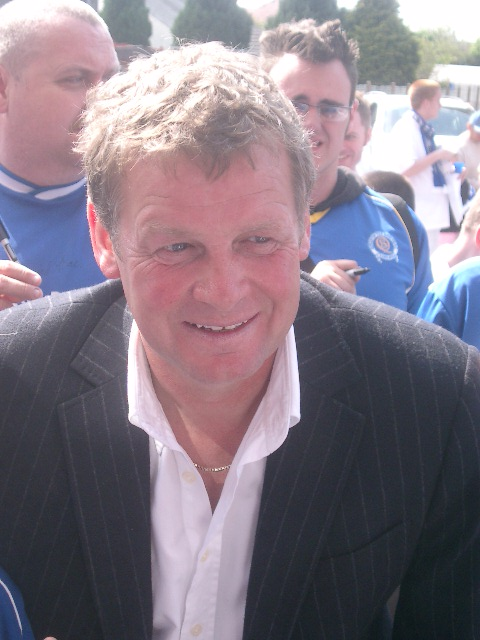
Gordon Chisholm

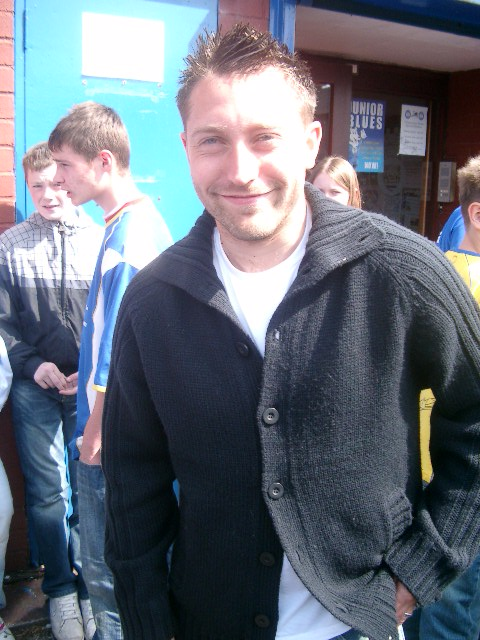
Stephen Dobbie

Queen of the South's recently improved record was blotted during the 1999–2000 season. At the end of a poor season only a controversial points deduction for Hamilton Academical saved Queen of the South from relegation to the Third Division.

John Connolly was appointed manager in July 2000. With captain Jim Thomson Queens ruled the Second Division to take the title in 2001–02. On 20 April 2002, like 51 years before, this was clinched with Queen's winning away at Forfar Athletic. This time it was 3–0 with goals by forwards Peter Weatherson (2) and Sean O'Connor leading to jubilant fans pouring onto the pitch after full-time. Goal scoring midfielder John O'Neill was awarded divisional player of the year. The following season saw Queen's victorious in the Scottish Challenge Cup with Robbie Neilson playing. Brechin City were condemned to a 2–0 defeat in the final at Clyde's Broadwood Stadium. In the Scottish Cup third round Queens held Aberdeen to a 0–0 draw at Palmerston before losing the replay. Bradford left due to ill health in June 2003. Davie Rae took over as chairman.

John Connolly left the club in May 2004 to join former club St Johnstone, with his former assistant Iain Scott taking over. With a second consecutive fifth place spot in 2004, Queens became the first part-time club to remain in the new First Division for more than two years. Queens then finished fourth in the First Division in 2005 – their highest finish since 1963.

Iain Scott parted from the club with the club second bottom of the league in 2005–06. Dumfries-born Ian McCall, by this time also a BBC media pundit, was appointed manager in November 2005. McCall brought in Gordon Chisholm as his assistant. Seven new players were acquired in the January transfer 'window'. Queens went on a run, losing only once at home since November and collecting 23 points from their last 12 games. It secured its First Division survival with a 1–1 draw at Brechin City on 22 April 2006.

A poor start to the 2006–07 campaign saw the Dumfries side bottom of the league after 21 games. Inspired by the goals of January transfer window signing Stephen Dobbie, a twelve match unbeaten run led to the side avoiding relegation in the penultimate game of the season. A Scottish Cup run that included a replay penalty shoot-out victory over Dundee saw Queens make the quarter-finals before Hibernian won 2–1 at Palmerston. McCall's time at Queens was soured when Queens were fined £20,000 after McCall fielded an ineligible player in the cup run. Chairman Davie Rae described the fine as, "A substantial sum". Queen of the South and Ian McCall parted company at the season's end.

Davie Rae led the club to full-time football at the start of the 2007–08 season. Gordon Chisholm was announced as the new manager on 28 June 2007 and appointed Kenny Brannigan as assistant. After an injury-filled start to the season, Queens picked up with a 10-game unbeaten run in all competitions that started in January. This run propelled Queens to 4th in the Scottish First Division, where they finished the season.

=== 2007–08 Scottish Cup Final run ===
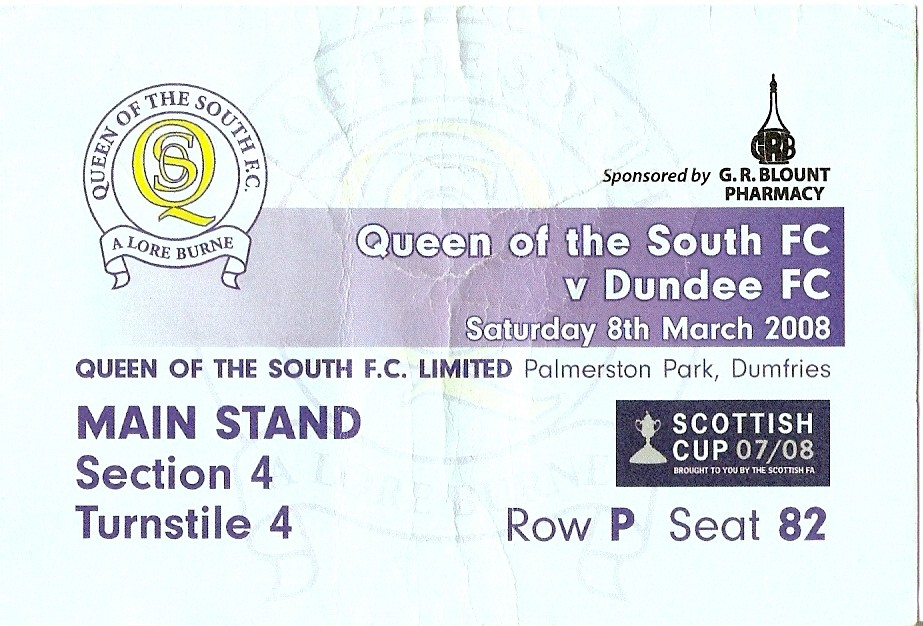
Quarter final match ticket

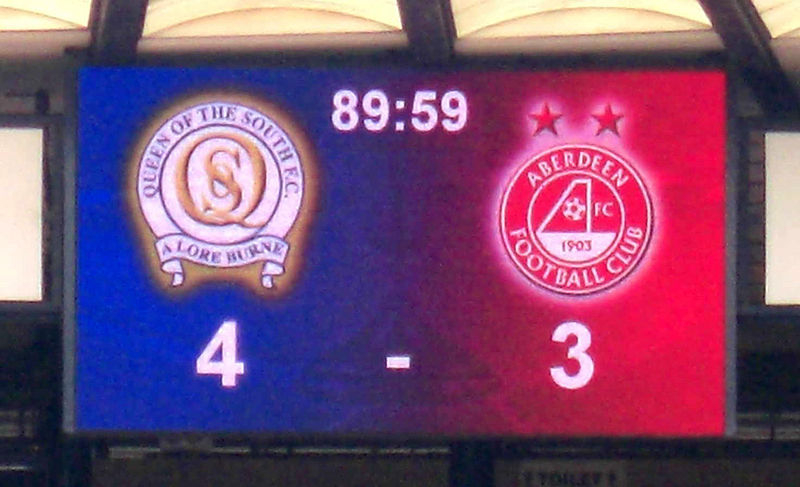
Semi final result on the scoreboard at Hampden Park

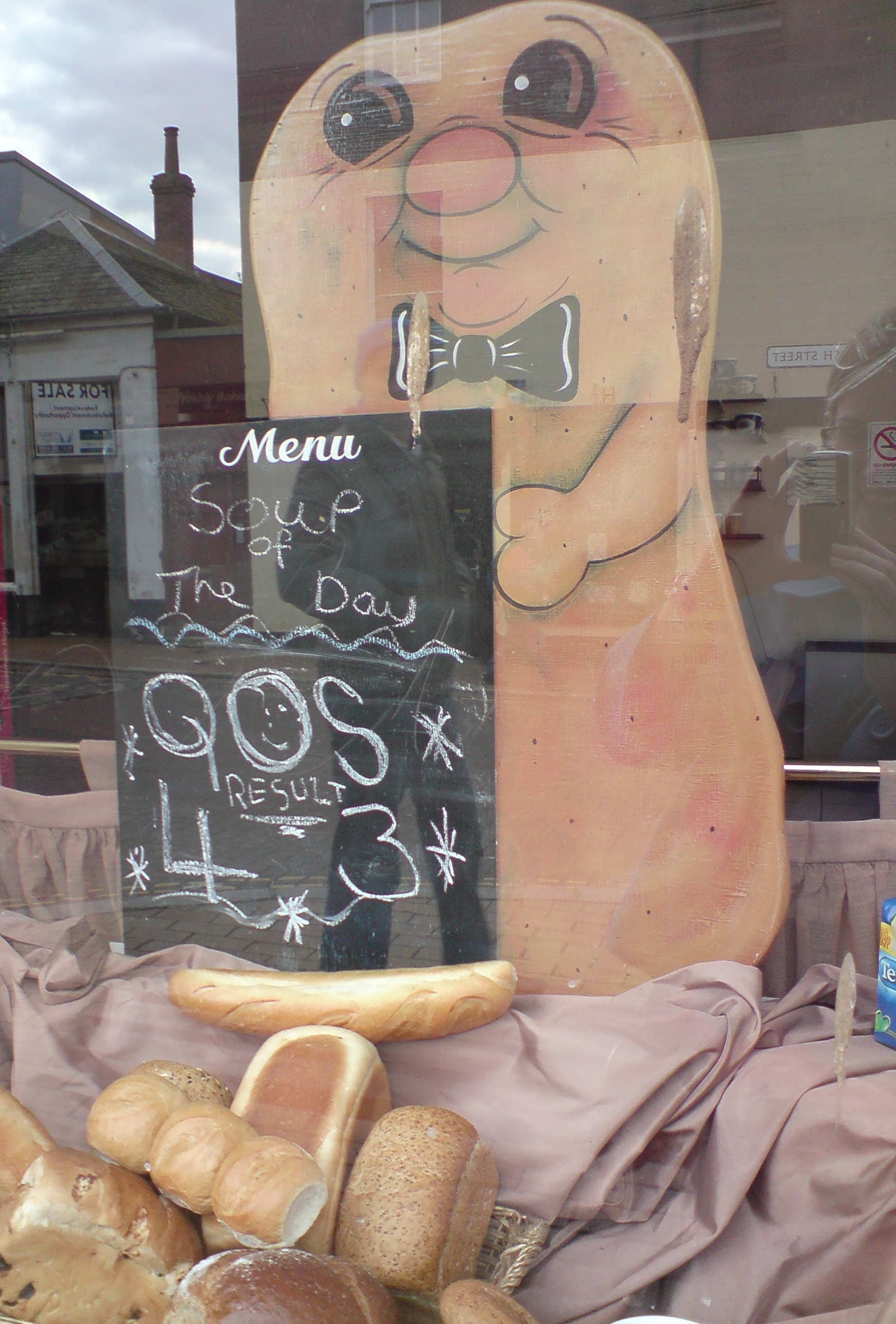
Semi final result in a Dumfries baker's window

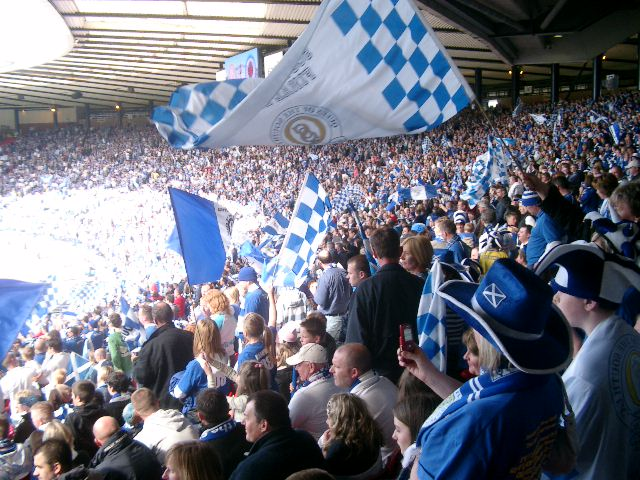
QoS fans enjoy the day out to the 2008 Scottish Cup final

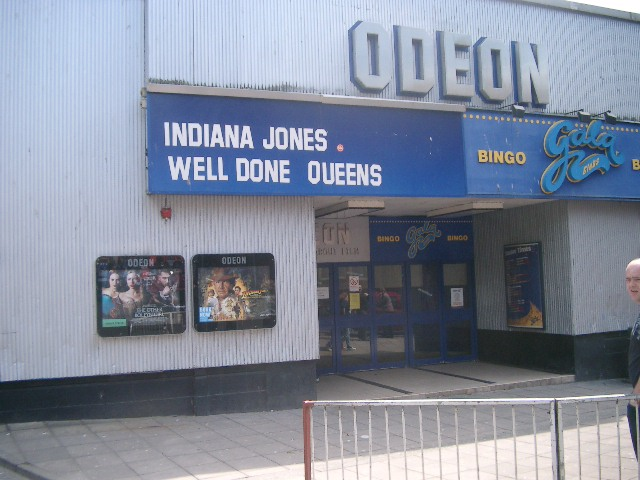
The Odeon at Dumfries captures the good will in the town regarding Queen of the South's run to the Scottish Cup final

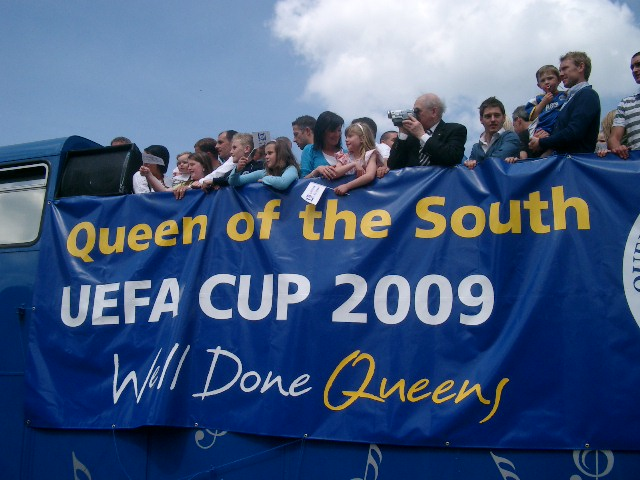
Open top bus for the QoS cup final squad

On 8 March 2008 Queen of the South qualified for their first Scottish Cup semi-final in 58 years after a 2–0 quarter-final home victory over Dundee at Palmerston. The goals came from prolific marksman Stephen Dobbie and an 84-yard (77 m) injury time long-distance shot from Ryan McCann, with an application pending for the Guinness Book of Records as the longest distance goal ever scored by an outfield player (the previous record reportedly stood at 82 yards).

The semi-final at Hampden Park, Glasgow on 12 April, was against Premier League club Aberdeen who finished fourth in the league. Although Queens were underdogs, over 10,000 Queens fans were in the crowd of 24,008 to witness an astonishing game. Four times Queens took the lead with goals through Steve Tosh, Paul Burns, Sean O'Connor and John Stewart. Three times Aberdeen hit back with an equaliser including a goal from Dumfries boy Barry Nicholson. During an 11-minute spell at the beginning of the second half, five goals were scored, with Queens fourth goal of the day giving a 4–3 victory for the Doonhamers. Aberdeen fans generously applauded Queens victory. The highest scoring game in a Scottish Cup semi-final took rocket Queens to the final for the first time in their 89-year history.

After four weeks without a competitive match and following the end of the Scottish League Division One season, the Scottish Cup Final was against Rangers on 24 May 2008 at Hampden Park. Despite a battling second half performance to pull back the two goal half-time deficit to 2–2 Queens eventually lost 3–2. Queens scorers were Stevie Tosh and long-serving captain Jim Thomson. Afterwards Queens players expressed their disappointment in the result. Tosh voiced his frustrations at refereeing decisions that went against Queens.

For a team with the core of its support being in a town with a population of 38,000 Queens took a support of around 15,500 to the final. Queens fans were widely praised for their good humour and carnival-like contribution to the day. Despite defeat in the final 14,000 fans attended an open top bus parade by the team through Dumfries.

Date	Round	Teams, score & Queen's scorers	Attendance
24:11:07	Third	Peterhead 0–5 Queen of the South (Dobbie 27, 89, O'Connor 44, 57, Burns 90)	695
12:01:08	Fourth	Queen of the South (Dobbie 16, Thomson 22, O'Connor 40, McArthur 72 (og)) 4–0 Linlithgow Rose	3,062
02:02:08	Fifth	Greenock Morton 0–2 Queen of the South (O'Connor 46, Stewart 87)	3,506
08:03:08	Sixth	Queen of the South (Dobbie 51, McCann 90) 2–0 Dundee	6,278
12:04:08	Semi-final	Queen of the South (Tosh 22, Burns 49, O'Connor 56, Stewart 60) 4–3 Aberdeen	24,008
24:05:08	Final	Queen of the South (Tosh 50, Thomson 53) 2–3 Rangers	48,821

=== 2008–09 UEFA Cup Appearance ===
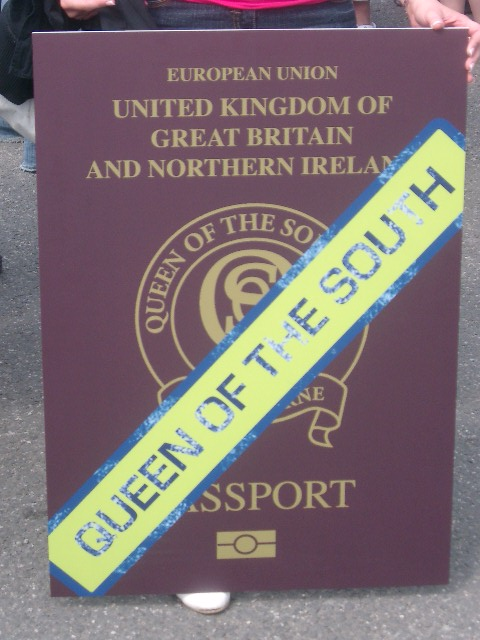
QoS fans the day after the 2008 Scottish Cup Final eagerly await the UEFA Cup adventure

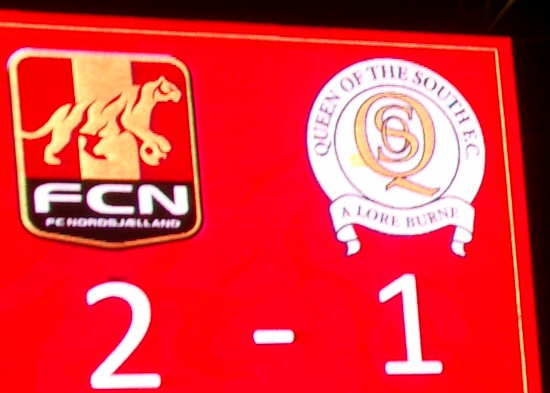
Scoreboard at full-time in Denmark

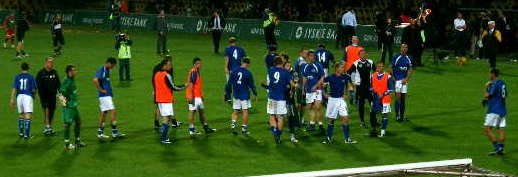
UEFA Cup exit for Queen's in Denmark

From the Scottish Cup run Queen of the South qualified for the 2nd qualification round of the 2008–09 UEFA Cup. BBC TV cup final coverage described Queens UEFA Cup qualification as "The very essence of sport".

Queens were drawn against Danish club FC Nordsjælland with ties scheduled for Thursday 14 August in Scotland and Tuesday 26 August in Denmark. UEFA seating restrictions meant Queens played their home UEFA Cup tie at the Excelsior Stadium – home of Airdrie United. After surviving two pitch inspections because of heavy rain Queens lost 2–1. Sean O'Connor's headed Queens goal.

In the away leg Bob Harris had the Doonhamers in the lead from a free-kick after 2 minutes. With Queens pushing for the critical second goal and throwing caution to the wind late in the game, with 5 minutes remaining two goals by Martin Bernburg of Nordsjælland put the tie beyond Queens. Despite Dobbie being the most prolific goal scorer at Queens since Andy Thomson in the early 1990s, Chisholm elected to leave Dobbie out of the starting line-up for both games, preferring instead to play Stewart Kean. Among those selected to start for Queens was on loan future Scotland international, Cammy Bell.

Nordsjaelland head coach Morten Wieghorst applauded Queen of the South's efforts in the Scottish side's defeat. "I must give lot of credit to Queens, my players looked under pressure. They couldn't handle it in the first half and we got off to a dreadful start with the early goal for Queens. Overall, I think Queens had more chances than us."

Nordsjaelland skipper Henrik Kildentoft added: "It wasn't an easy game. We knew it would be tough, because our manager Morten Wieghorst has played against First Division teams in Scotland himself and he told us they would go for it all the way. Looking back at the game, I would say we delivered a mixed performance — a very bad first half and a good second half."

=== 2009–10 Chisholm Departs for Dundee with Dodds; Brannigan Appointed ===
Queens finished fourth in the First Division and reached the third round of the Challenge Cup, the third round of the League Cup and the third round of the Scottish Cup.

=== 2010–11 Scottish First Division & Scottish Challenge Cup Final ===
Queens finished fourth in the First Division for a second consecutive season and also reached the 2010 Scottish Challenge Cup Final where they were defeated 2–0 by Ross County in a postponed match from 28 November 2010, with the match eventually played at McDiarmid Park in Perth on 10 April 2011.

=== 2011–12 Scottish First Division ===
Queens were relegated to the Scottish Second Division after finishing tenth in the Scottish First Division. This ended their decade playing in Scotland's second top tier. After the club's relegation was confirmed after the match at Stark's Park on 28 April 2012, manager Gus MacPherson and his assistant Andy Millen left the club by mutual consent two days later.

On 3 May 2012 Queens appointed Allan Johnston as their new player manager. On 14 May 2012 Queen's appointed Sandy Clark as their new assistant manager.

=== 2012–13 Scottish Second Division Champions & Scottish Challenge Cup winners ===
Queens finished first in the Second Division to be crowned champions and were promoted to the Scottish Championship and were also the winners of the Challenge Cup to complete a historic double for the club and also reached the third round of the League Cup and the fourth round of the Scottish Cup.

=== 2013–14 Scottish Championship & Scottish Premiership play-offs ===
Queens finished fourth in the Scottish Championship and their league position qualified the club for the semi-final stage of the Scottish Premiership play-offs, where they were defeated 4–3 on aggregate by Falkirk over two legs.

The club reached the third round of the Challenge Cup, the third round of the League Cup and the fourth round of the Scottish Cup.

=== 2014–15 Scottish Championship ===
Queens finished fourth in the Scottish Championship and their league position qualified the club for the semi-final stage of the Scottish Premiership play-offs, where they were defeated 3–2 on aggregate by Rangers over two legs.

The club reached the first round of the Challenge Cup, the second round of the League Cup and the sixth round of the Scottish Cup.

=== 2015–16 Scottish Championship ===
Queens finished seventh in the Scottish Championship.

The club reached the sixth round of the Challenge Cup, the third round of the League Cup and the third round of the Scottish Cup.

=== 2016–17 Scottish Championship ===
Queens finished sixth in the Scottish Championship.

The club reached the sixth round of the Challenge Cup, the third round of the League Cup and the third round of the Scottish Cup.

=== 2017–18 Scottish Championship ===
Queens finished sixth in the Scottish Championship for the second consecutive season.

Queens reached the fourth round of the Challenge Cup, losing to The New Saints after a penalty shoot-out 4–3, with no goals scored after extra time.

The Doonhamers were knocked out after the first round of the League Cup after the completion of fixtures in Group G that included Albion Rovers, East Kilbride, Hamilton Academical and Stenhousemuir.

Queens reached the fourth round of the Scottish Cup, losing out to 2–1 at Palmerston to Partick Thistle.

=== 2018–19 in the Scottish Championship (Queens Centenary Season) ===
Queens finished ninth in the Scottish Championship and their league position qualified the club for the semi-final stage of the play-offs, where the played Montrose and progressed 6–2 on aggregate. Queen's won the play-off final 3–1 on aggregate versus Raith Rovers.

Queens reached the third round of the Challenge Cup, losing 2–0 away to East Fife.

Queens reached the second round of the League Cup, losing 4–2 after extra time at Palmerston to St Johnstone.

Queens reached the fifth round of the Scottish Cup, losing 4–1 to Aberdeen at Pittodrie.

=== 2019–20 Scottish Championship ===
Queens finished ninth in the Scottish Championship, although there were no play-offs due to the COVID-19 pandemic. Queens retained their place in the Championship after the leagues were ended by utilising a points-per-game ratio to determine the final league standings.

Queens reached the third round of the Challenge Cup, losing 3–2 away to Clyde.

The Doonhamers were knocked out after the first round of the League Cup after the completion of fixtures in Group E that included Annan Athletic, Dumbarton, Greenock Morton and Motherwell.

Queens reached the third round of the Scottish Cup, losing 2–1 to Queen's Park at Palmerston.

On 13 March 2020, all SPFL leagues were indefinitely suspended due to the COVID-19 pandemic.

On 8 April 2020, the SPFL proposed to end the 2019-20 season by utilising a points-per-game ratio to determine the final league standings.

On 15 April 2020, the plan was approved, with this declaration that the season was concluded, as Dundee United were declared title winners, with Partick Thistle relegated to League One.

=== 2020-21 Scottish Championship ===
Queens finished sixth in the Scottish Championship. The league season was curtailed to 27 matches, due to the COVID-19 pandemic, starting on 17 October 2020 and ending on 30 April 2021.

The Doonhamers were knocked out after the first round of the League Cup after the completion of fixtures in Group G that included Greenock Morton, Partick Thistle, Queen's Park and St Mirren.

Queens reached the third round of the Scottish Cup, losing 3-1 at Palmerston to eventual runners-up Hibernian.

The Challenge Cup was not held during the 2020-21 season due to the COVID-19 pandemic.

=== 2021-22 Scottish Championship ===
Queens finished tenth in the Scottish Championship and were relegated to Scottish League One, ending nine straight seasons in Scottish Football's second tier.

Queens reached the 2022 Scottish Challenge Cup Final, ending runners-up to Raith Rovers, losing 3-1 at the Excelsior Stadium, Airdrie.

The Doonhamers were knocked out after the first round of the League Cup after the completion of fixtures in Group F that included Airdrieonians, Annan Athletic, Motherwell and Queen's Park.

Queens reached the third round of the Scottish Cup, losing 3-0 at Palmerston to Cove Rangers in a replay, after a 2-2 draw at the Balmoral Stadium.

=== 2022-23 Scottish League One ===
Queens finished fifth in Scottish League One in their first season back in Scottish Football's third tier, since the 2012-13 season.

Queens reached the sixth round of the Challenge Cup, losing 2-1 after extra time to Hamilton Academical at New Douglas Park.

Queens reached the second round of the League Cup, losing 3-1 to Rangers at Ibrox Stadium.

Queens reached the third round of the Scottish Cup, losing 4-1 to Greenock Morton at Cappielow Park.

=== 2023-24 Scottish League One ===
Queens finished seventh in Scottish League One in their second season back in Scottish Football's third tier.

Queens reached the fourth round of the Challenge Cup, losing 2-1 to Arbroath at Palmerston Park.

The Doonhamers were knocked out after the first round of the League Cup after the completion of fixtures in Group G that included East Fife, Elgin City, Motherwell and Queen's Park.

Queens reached the fourth round of the Scottish Cup, losing 1-0 to St Mirren at St Mirren Park.

=== 2024-25 Scottish League One ===
Queens finished third in Scottish League One in their third season back in Scottish Football's third tier and their league position qualified the club for the semi-final stage of the play-offs, where they played Cove Rangers and were defeated 2–1 on aggregate.

Queens reached the third round of the Challenge Cup, losing 3-0 to Airdrieonians at Palmerston Park.

The Doonhamers were knocked out after the first round of the League Cup after the completion of fixtures in Group A that included Aberdeen, Airdrieonians, Dumbarton and East Kilbride.

Queens reached the fourth round of the Scottish Cup, losing 3-1 to St Mirren at Palmerston Park.

=== 2025-26 Scottish League One ===
Queens finished third in Scottish League One for the second successive season, in their fourth season back in Scottish Football's third tier and their league position qualified the club for the semi-final stage of the play-offs, where they played Stenhousemuir. The semi-final ended 2-2 on aggregate after the second leg and 3-3 on aggregate after extra-time, with the Warriors progressing to the play-off final, after winning the penalty shoot-out 4-3.

Queens reached the third round of the Challenge Cup, losing 1-0 to Raith Rovers at Stark's Park.

The Doonhamers were knocked out after the first round of the League Cup after the completion of fixtures in Group B that included Edinburgh City, Partick Thistle, Ross County and Stranraer.

Queens reached the third round of the Scottish Cup, losing 2-1 to Dunfermline Athletic at East End Park.
