= Adam Allan =

Scottish footballer (1904 – after 1937)

Personal information
- Full name: Adam McIlroy Allan
- Date of birth: 12 September 1904
- Place of birth: Newarthill, Scotland
- Position: Centre half

Youth career
- Regent Star

Senior career*
Years	Team	Apps	(Gls)
–	Falkirk		
1927–1930	Sunderland	63	(0)
1930–1933	Reading	106	(3)
1933–????	Queen of the South		
- * Club domestic league appearances and goals

Adam McIlroy Allan (12 September 1904 – after 1937) was a professional footballer who played at centre half. He played for Falkirk, Sunderland, Reading and Queen of the South.

== Early years ==
Adam Allan was born in Newarthill, Scotland.

Adam Allan started his senior career with Falkirk.

== Sunderland ==
Allan moved South to join Sunderland. His debut was 27 August 1927 in a 3–3 draw against Portsmouth at home. He was there for three seasons, with his last game being a 4–1 defeat away against Everton on 3 May 1930. He made 20 appearances in the league that first season.

At Sunderland he was a teammate of the player who was the 1928/29 top scorer in England's top division, ex Queen of the South player, Dave Halliday. This was Allan's most successful season at Sunderland. The club ended the season as England's fourth team in the league in which Allan had made 29 appearances as well an FA Cup appearance.

In his third and final season at Roker, Allan made 14 first team appearances and a further FA Cup appearance (a 2-2 draw against Nottingham Forest). Thus in total he made 63 league appearances and two appearances in the FA Cup for Sunderland.

== Reading ==
After Sunderland, Allan joined Reading for whom he made 106 appearances in the league scoring three goals.

== Queen of the South ==
Allan joined newly promoted Queen of the South in 1933 for their first season in the top division of Scottish football. Allan played a prominent role in Queens achieving what remains their highest top division finish, fourth in 1933/34. Among the scalps Queens took that season were double victories over Celtic, Hibs and Hearts. Queens reached the Scottish Cup quarter finals before losing to two deflected goals away to St. Johnstone.

Allan was part of the George McLachlan managed 1936 Summer tour to France, Luxembourg, and Algeria.

On the back of league wins against Dundee and Hibs, on 30 January 1937 captained by Willie Savage, with Willie Fotheringham in goal and with Willie Culbert, Laurie Cumming, Joe Tulip and Jackie Law, Sr also playing, Queen of the South condemned Rangers to a 1–0 first round Scottish Cup exit. The Evening Times reported, "It was more than a merited win for Queen of the South. It was a triumph".
