= Douglas McBain =

Scottish footballer

Personal information
- Full name: Douglas Muir McBain
- Date of birth: 22 September 1924
- Place of birth: Blantyre, Scotland
- Date of death: 1 February 2008 (aged 83)
- Place of death: Currie, Scotland
- Position: Wing half

Senior career*
Years	Team	Apps	(Gls)
1942–1944	Dumbarton	?	(?)
1944–1946	Hamilton Academical	?	(?)
1946–1948	Queen's Park	20	(0)
1948–1955	Queen of the South	148	(3)
Total		168	(3)

International career
1948	Great Britain	3	(1)
- * Club domestic league appearances and goals

Douglas Muir McBain (22 September 1924 – 1 February 2008) was a Scottish footballer who played in the run to the semi-final for Great Britain at the 1948 Summer Olympics. McBain played club football as a wing half for Dumbarton, Hamilton Academical, Queen's Park and Queen of the South.

== Playing career ==
Dougie McBain's club football career is best remembered for his time with Dumfries club Queen of the South. McBain spent seven years with Queens starting from 1948, the year in which he played in the run to a Wembley semi final of the Olympic Games for Matt Busby's Great Britain side (McBain scored against Netherlands at Highbury in the first round). McBain was one of two players in the GB Olympic team to move from Queen's Park to Palmerston Park in Dumfries that summer. The other player was Jimmy McColl.

At Queens, McBain played alongside some of the finest names to have played for the club, such as Billy Houliston, Roy Henderson, Dougie Sharpe, Jackie Oakes, Jim Patterson, Jimmy Binning and Bobby Black. McBain's time in Dumfries was part of the finest era in the club's history. McBain was the club captain when he played and scored in Queens' run to the 1950 Scottish Cup semi final, where Rangers needed a replay at Hampden Park to finally end Queens' best ever run in the Scottish Cup at that time. McBain was an integral part of the team that achieved numerous other points of note in the first half of the 1950s.

McBain left Queens in 1955 after a contractual dispute with the chairman and retired from professional football. McBain was only 30 years old at the time.

== Education and later career ==
Having been schooled at the Hamilton Academy, McBain went on to graduate from the University of Edinburgh before becoming a lecturer at Telford College.

Dougie McBain died on 1 February 2008, at the age of 83.

== Personal life ==
McBain served as an air gunner with the rank of flying officer in the Royal Air Force during the Second World War.
