= Jimmy Brown (footballer, born 1924) =

Scottish footballer

Personal information
- Full name: James Brown
- Date of birth: 16 February 1924
- Place of birth: Cumnock, Scotland
- Date of death: 17 January 2002 (aged 77)
- Place of death: New Cumnock, Scotland
- Position: Centre forward

Youth career
- Kello Rovers

Senior career*
Years	Team	Apps	(Gls)
1946–1947	Motherwell	18	(16)
1948	Chesterfield	5	(2)
1948–1949	Bradford City	20	(11)
1949–1950	Queen of the South	14	(1)
1950–1952	Carlisle United	15	(9)
- Annan Athletic
- * Club domestic league appearances and goals

James Brown (16 February 1924 – 17 January 2002) was a Scottish footballer who played as a centre forward for clubs in Scotland and England.

Brown was born in Cumnock. He was a prolific goal-scorer in a brief career following the Second World War, notably scoring 16 goals in just 18 games for Motherwell and being Bradford City's club top scorer in his one season at the club, in 1948–49, when he amassed 11 goals in 20 games. He also played for Chesterfield and the Queen of the South side of Billy Houliston, Roy Henderson, Jim Patterson and Dougie Sharpe. Brown then played for Carlisle United, before dropping down to the Carlisle and District League with Annan Athletic.
