= Roy Henderson =

Roy Henderson may refer to:

- Roy Henderson (baritone) (1899–2000), British baritone singer and conductor
- Roy Henderson (footballer) (1923–1997), Scottish football player
