= RW MacKenna =

Scottish physician and author

Robert William MacKenna (1874–1930) was a Scottish physician and author. He is best known for his historical novels set during the time of the Covenanters, and for his work in dermatology. He combined a successful medical career with literary achievements, writing both fiction and non-fiction on life, death, and Scottish history.

== Biography ==
MacKenna was born in Dumfries, Scotland. He was educated at Dumfries Academy, where he was taught by John Neilson, who had also taught J. M. Barrie. In 1892, he enrolled at the University of Edinburgh, where he became the first person to undertake both arts and medical degrees simultaneously.

After qualifying as a physician, MacKenna specialised in dermatology and published a medical manual, Diseases of the Skin: A Manual for Students and Practitioners, in 1923. Alongside his medical career, he became a well-known author, with a particular interest in Scottish religious history. His historical novels often explored themes related to the 17th-century Covenanter movement and depicted scenes of Scottish rural and religious life.

His writing was known for its emotional depth, historical accuracy, and engagement with themes such as faith, suffering, and resilience. Several of his novels, such as Flower o’ the Heather and O Rowan Tree, were praised for their evocative portrayal of the Scottish landscape and spirit.

MacKenna died in 1930, leaving behind a diverse body of work respected both in the medical field and in Scottish literary circles.

== Bibliography ==
- The Adventure of Death. 1916.
- The Adventure of Life. 1919.
- Through a Tent Door. 1919.
- Flower o' the Heather. 1922.
- Bracken and Thistledown. 1923.
- Diseases of the Skin: A Manual for Students and Practitioners. 1923.
- Through Flood and Fire. 1925.
- O Rowan Tree. 1928.
- As Shadows Lengthen. 1932.
