= Jackie Law Jr. =

Scottish footballer

Jackie Law Jr. is a Scottish former professional footballer who played for Queen of the South and Stranraer.

Law Junior was born in Kelloholm and went to school at Dumfries Academy. Law Junior signed for Queen of the South in 1963 from Dumfries amateur club Greystone Rovers. In playing for the Doonhamers himself and his brother, Lex Law, were following in the footsteps of their father, Jackie Law Sr. In Law Junior's career he made 125 Queens appearances and scored 34 goals for the Doonhamers.

On 24 October 1964, Lex and Jackie Jr. both scored in the same match in the 7–1 win versus Stenhousemuir at Palmerston Park. Jackie scored three and Lex scored one goal in this match.

Law Junior played 16 league matches for Stranraer in the 1967-68 season.

Jackie Law Jr. died in 1996 aged 52 and remained a committed Queens supporter until his death.
