= Jimmy Binning =

Scottish footballer

Personal information
- Birth name: James Binning
- Date of birth: 21 December 1922
- Place of birth: Blantyre, Scotland
- Date of death: 1991 (aged 68)
- Place of death: Airdrie, Scotland
- Position: Left back

Youth career
- Strathclyde

Senior career*
Years	Team	Apps	(Gls)
1948–1951	Arbroath	84	(6)
1951–1959	Queen of the South	221	(1)
Total		305	(7)

International career
1954	Scottish League XI	1	(0)
- * Club domestic league appearances and goals

James Binning (21 December 1922 – 1991) was a Scottish footballer who played for Arbroath and Dumfries side Queen of the South.

== Career ==
From the season 1948–1949 until his departure, Binning scored six goals in his 84 league games for Arbroath. Binning was a 1951 signing from Arbroath for Queen of the South. Half a century later another distinguished player would make the same journey, Jim Thomson. Binning gave Queens seven years service at full-back, playing 288 senior games for Queens.

When Binning arrived at Queens already there were Scotland cap Billy Houliston, goalkeeper Roy Henderson, fellow full back Dougie Sharpe and forward Jim Patterson (251 strikes makes Patterson the goals king of Queens). Goal scoring winger Bobby Black joined in 1952. At different levels all six would be selected to represent Scotland except Henderson who was selected six times as reserve goalkeeper. After winning the Scottish League 'B' division in 1951 Binning played in the early and mid-1950s period of Queens regular top division mid table finishes. This was under the management of Jimmy McKinnell Junior.

=== International football ===
Binning was recognised internationally when he was given a Scottish League XI cap in 1954, against the English League at Stamford Bridge. Although selected for the 22 man squad for the 1954 FIFA World Cup, the Scottish Football Association only budgeted to take 13 players (including only one goalkeeper) to the finals in Switzerland. Binning was one of the players who stayed at home on reserve with the likes of Bobby Combe and Ernie Copland. Ex-Queens inside forward George Hamilton did travel after Bobby Johnstone with drew through injury.
