= Dumfries Academy =

Coordinates: 55.071°N 3.611°W

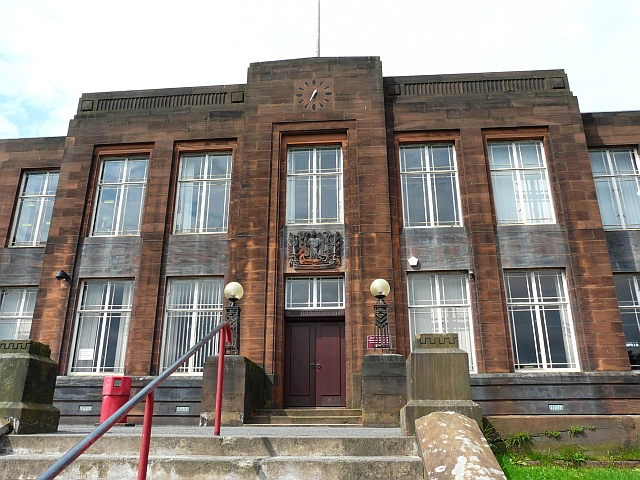
- Dumfries, Dumfries and Galloway; Scotland

Information
- Type: Comprehensive secondary
- Established: 1804; 222 years ago
- Head teacher: Joanne Dillon
- Teaching staff: 52
- Enrollment: 567
- Houses: Barrie, Haining and Laurie (formerly Criffel, Nithsdale and Solway)
- Colours: Maroon and Black
- Website: www.dumfriesacademy.org.uk

Dumfries Academy is one of four secondary schools in Dumfries in south west Scotland. It is a state funded secondary Co-ed school. The schools moto is "doctrina promovet" which translates from Latin to "learning promotes" which the school emphases within their "vision, values and aims". There are two notable buildings; the Minerva Building 1895-7 by F J C Carruthers and a later building by County Architect John R Hill, 1936.

== History ==
Dumfries Academy dates back to the 14th century, making it the earliest school in the Dumfries area. The school has occupied a number of different buildings, and has existed in its present form since 1804.

Early records show that John of Greyfriars, a monk, was appointed rector of a new school in Dumfries in 1330. Being a church school it concentrated on the study of religious texts, but in the centuries which followed other schools built in the town which taught subjects such as brewing, mathematics, English, baking, and needlework became integrated into the Academy building.

The Academy operated as a grammar school for those in Dumfries deemed academically gifted as based on exam results until July 1983. The most gifted students from three surrounding secondary schools, including Dumfries High School and Maxwelltown High School, transferred to the Academy after second year. As a result, Dumfries Academy had the highest rate of university entrance of any state school for many years.

== The Minerva building ==
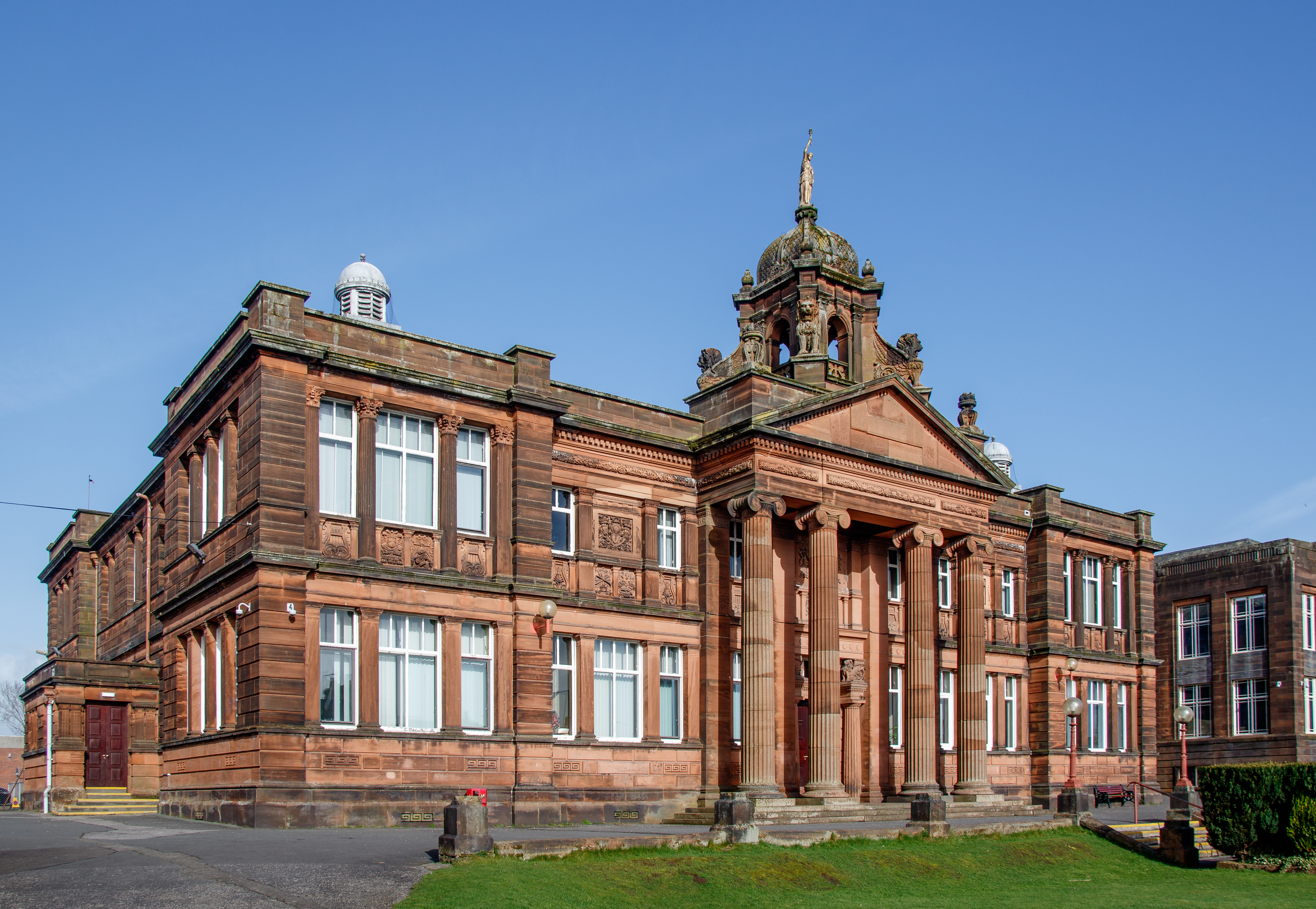
Minerva Building

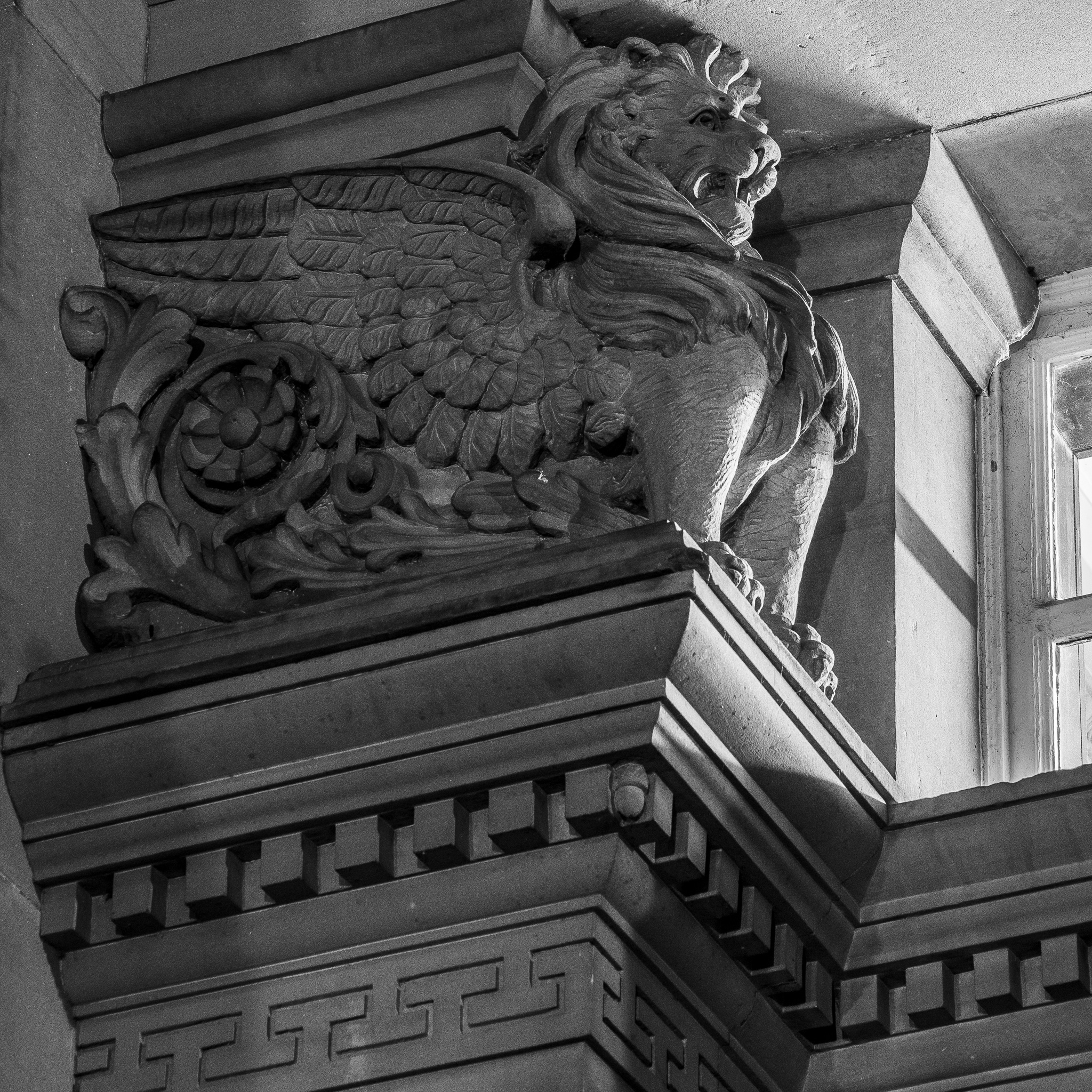
Architectural detail on the Minerva building, Dumfries Academy

The oldest building currently part of the school is the Minerva building. It was designed by prolific local architect F J C Carruthers, and built in 1895 -97 by stonemasons Houston and Robison. This is a two-storey building red sandstone in the English Baroque style with ornate carvings by sculptor James H. Douglas of Carlisle. The dome of the building features a gilded teak statue of Minerva, representing learning, from which the building gets its name. It was sculpted by Mr. Craig from Glasgow, following from the original architectural drawings by Carruthers. The Minerva building also features winged lions on either side of the door, and others around the cupola. There is an extensive description in Buildings of Scotland: Dumfries and Galloway by John Gifford.

== Uniform ==
The current uniform of Dumfries Academy consists of a white shirt, black trousers or skirt, a maroon blazer with the school crest attached and a maroon and black striped tie. In the academic year of 2026-2027, the school has decided to switch the blazer colour to maroon and predominantly maroon jumpers and cardigans for pupils. Blazers are not mandatory for pupils except for S6 students with Head Persons roles. During the 2006–2007 academic year, a senior tie consisting of a black background with white and maroon stripes and the school crest was introduced, to go along with the junior tie consisting of a maroon background with white and black stripes with the school crest. Junior Pupils from S1-S3 wear the junior tie and senior pupils from S4-6 wear the senior tie. S6 pupils that are either head pupils or deputy head pupils will also wear stripes on their uniform, two stripes for head pupils and one for deputy head pupils.

== Dumfries Academy today ==
The Academy has been a six-year comprehensive school since July 1985 serving part of the Burgh of Dumfries and surrounding rural communities, with an average roll of over 600 pupils and around 50 teaching staff. Students are placed into one of three houses in their first year; Barrie, Haining and Laurie, which are named after influential pupils that attended the school.

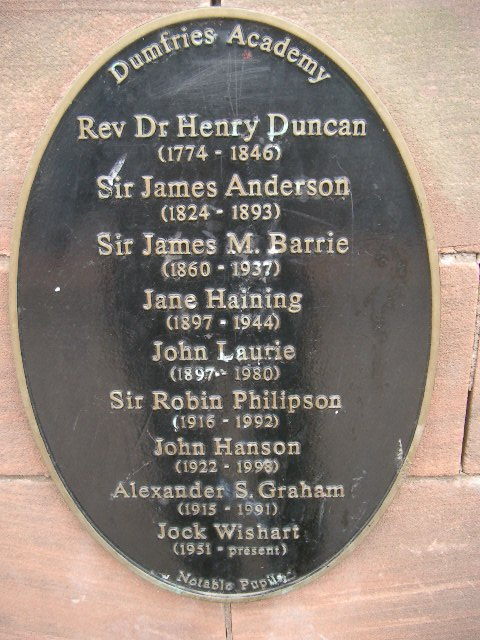

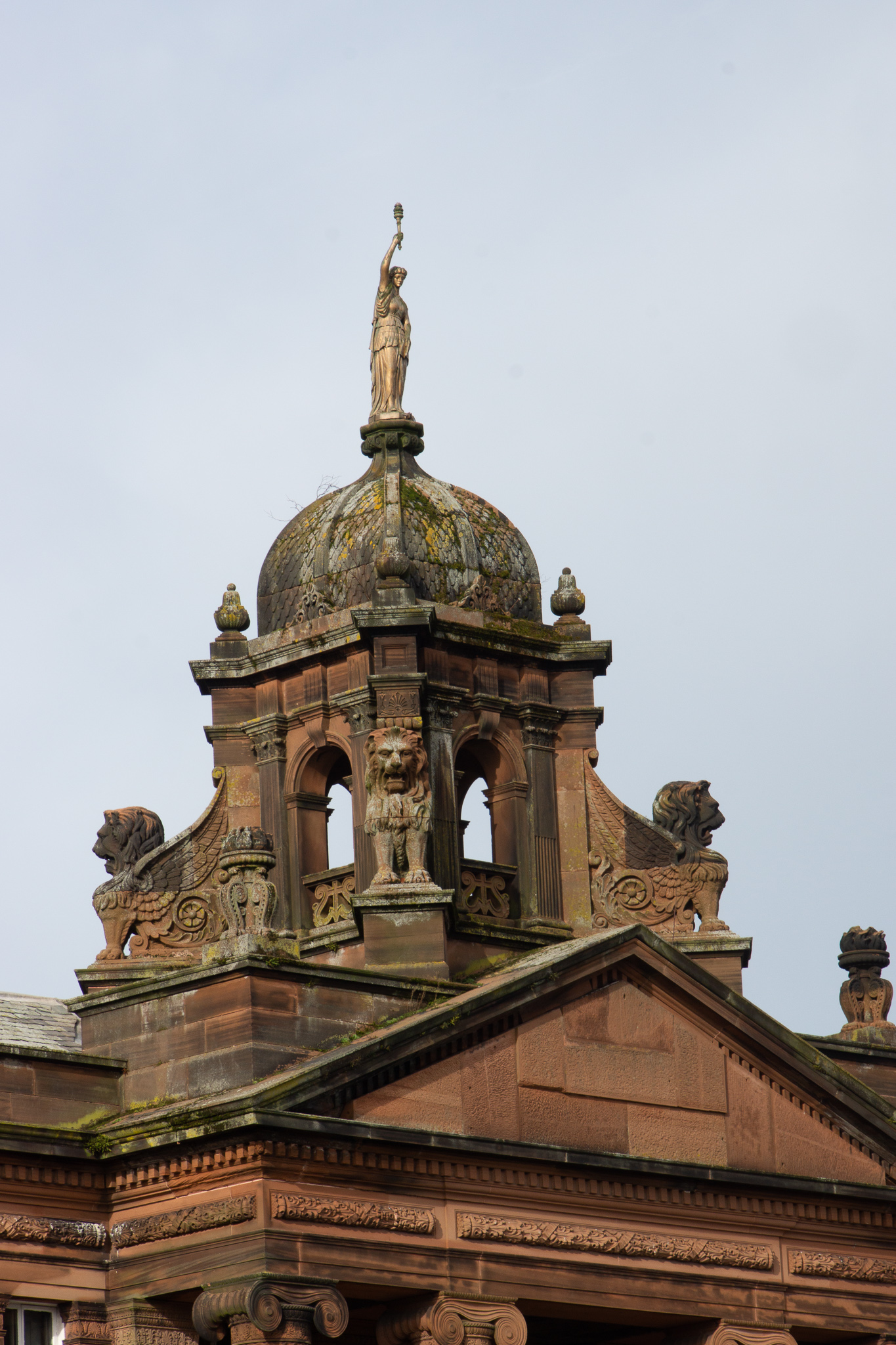

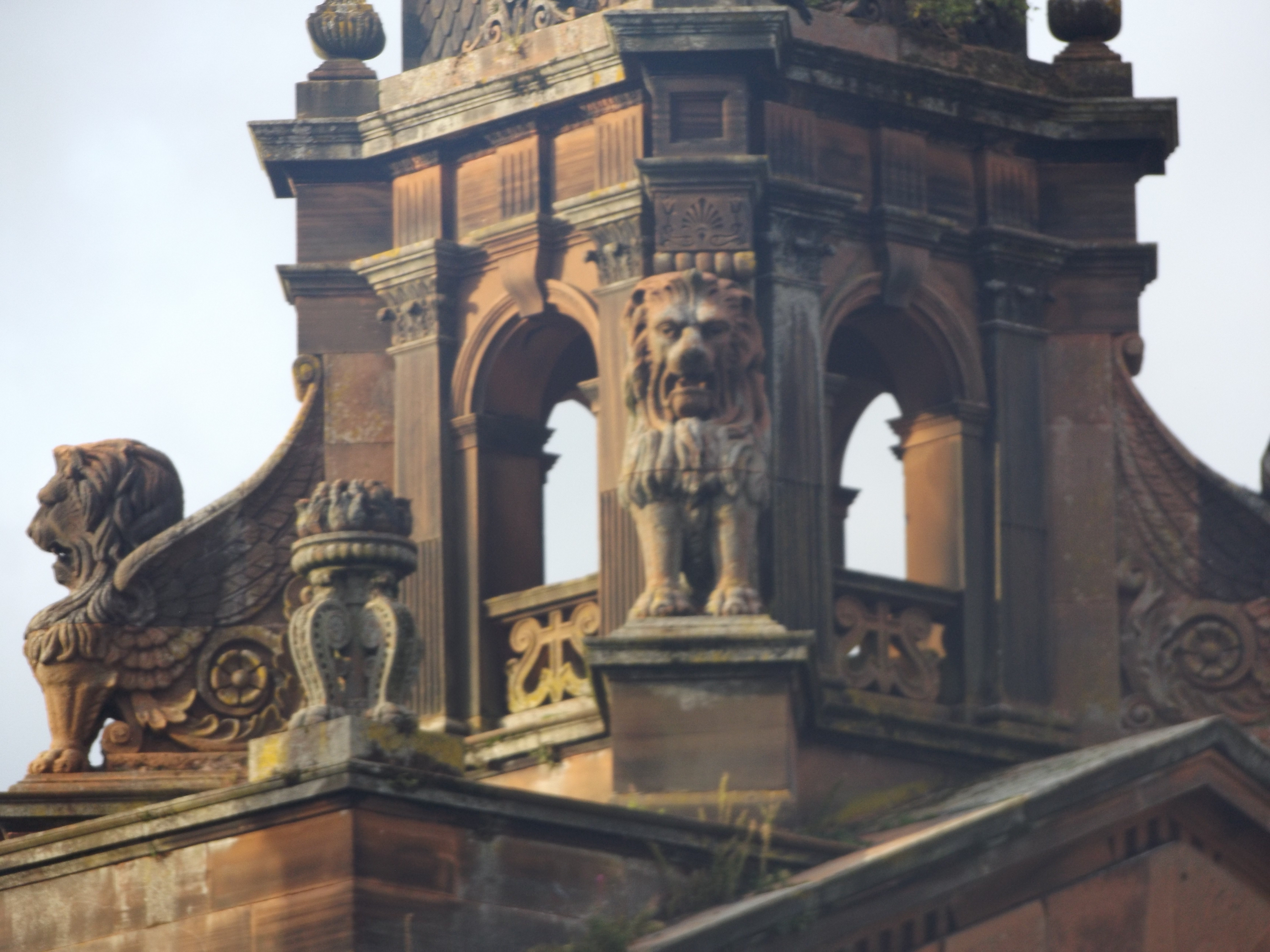

== Notable people ==
- Thomas White was a mathematics teacher and then Rector of Dumfries Academy. He was at the school from 1782 for 43 years. He was a close and loyal friend of Robert Burns.
- Sir J.M.Barrie - writer of Peter Pan attended the school from 1873, and it was here where his first play Bandelero the Bandit was performed by the Dumfries Amateur Dramatic Club in 1877
- Dr Aglionby Ross Carson, rector from 1801
- Sir James Crichton-Browne, eminent psychiatrist and president of the Medico-Psychological Association
- Rev. Dr. Henry Duncan, founder of the first savings bank
- James Oswald Dykes, ordained to the Presbyterian ministry in 1859
- Maurice Elliott, professional footballer
- Christian Jane Fergusson, artist
- Lauren Irving - Master of Martial Arts
- Alex Graham, cartoonist best known for the Fred Basset series
- Jane Haining, Church of Scotland missionary who ultimately lost her life to the Nazis rather than betray her convictions
- Dave Halliday, one of the highest goal scorers in UK football history and manager of Aberdeen to the Scottish League championship
- Grant Hanley, professional footballer, Scotland internationalist
- John Hanson, singer
- Sir Alexander Knox Helm, civil servant who held several important diplomatic posts
- Davie Irons, professional footballer and manager
- Stephen Jardine, TV presenter
- John Laurie, actor famous for Dad's Army
- Lex Law, ex professional footballer and age group internationalist
- Hugh McMillan, poet and former teacher at Dumfries Academy
- Barry Nicholson, Scottish international footballer
- Neil Oliver, archaeologist and author best known for his television work on the BBC series Coast and Two Men in a Trench, and presenter on GB News.
- Don Peattie, ex professional association footballer and now Head of Sport at City of Sunderland College
- Robin Philipson, artist
- Dougie Sharpe, Scottish Football League internationalist
- Dave Stevenson, Olympic pole vaulter and businessman
- Ben Trueman, Hotel Babylon fictional semi professional hitman and part-time mystic
- Jock Wishart, who in 1998 set a new world record for circumnavigating the globe in a powered vessel
- Ray Wilson, former member of the bands Stiltskin and Genesis

== Awards ==
In 2005, William McGair, History teacher at the Academy, was awarded the Scottish Daily Record Gold Award for Inspirational Teacher.
