= Thomas White (headteacher) =

Scottish headteacher (1758–1825)

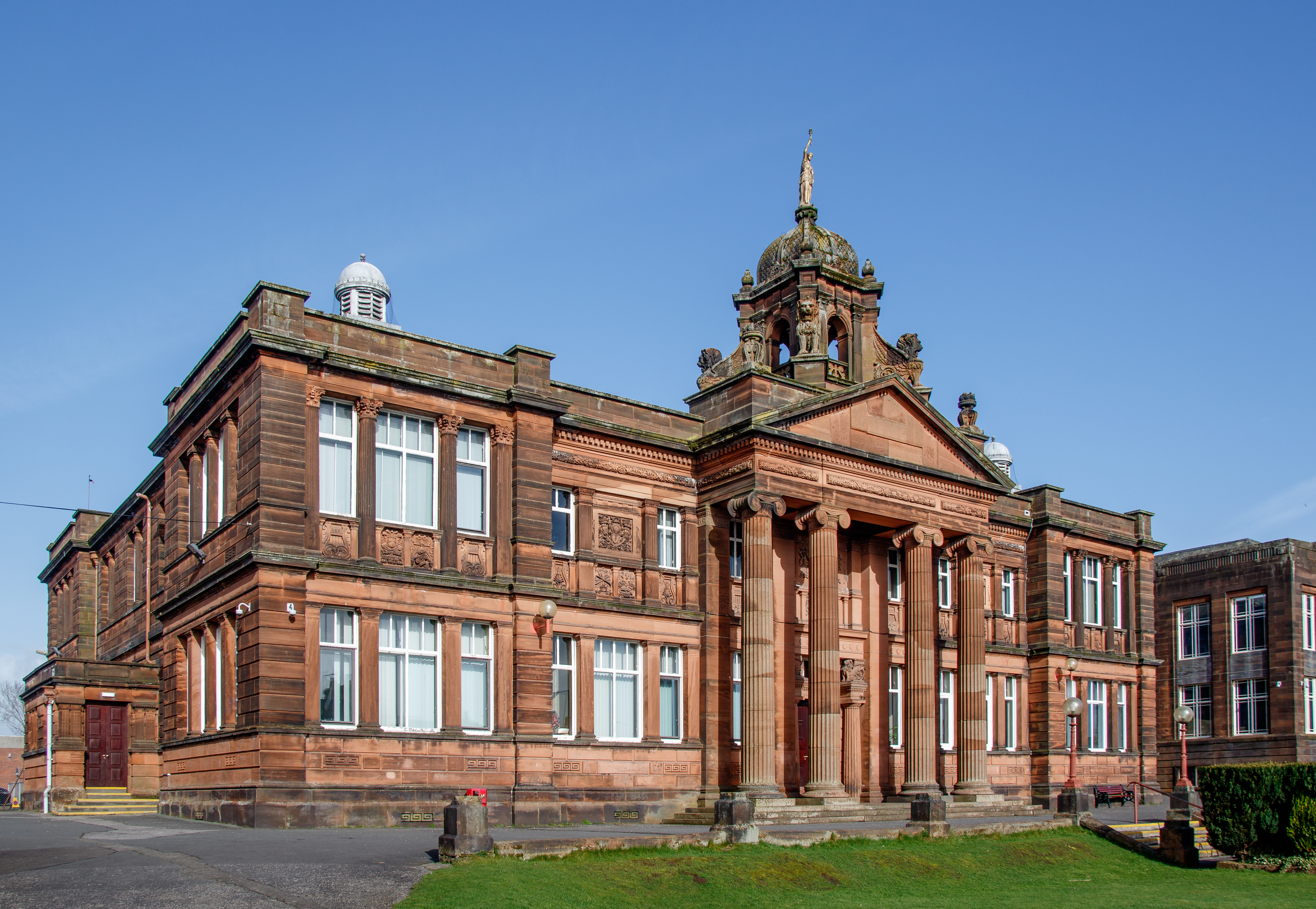
- Dumfries Academy
- Born: 12 April 1758; Hexham
- Died: 1 June 1825; Dumfries
- Occupation: Rector (headteacher)

Thomas White (1758–1825) was a close and loyal friend of the Scottish poet Robert Burns, a mathematician of note and eventually Rector (headteacher) of Dumfries Academy.

== Life and character ==
He was born at Hexham in Northumberland and settled in Dumfries in 1782, where he became a teacher of mathematics and later the Rector of Dumfries Academy, spending a total of forty-three years working at the school. John M'Diarmid, a contemporary, recalled that White was appointed "after a comparative trial, in which he foiled every competitor, and secured by the early display of his talents the friendship and esteem of those great ornaments of letters - Dugald Stewart and Professor Robinson."

White married Jean McNaught on the 7 July 1789 in Dumfries. He had three daughters. Jane and Henrietta never married; Eliza married John Richardson. He became a prominent and well respected member of Dumfries society. His memorial was "Erected by attached friends and pupils to commemorate the esteem in which the deceased was held." He was buried close to Burns in the St Michael's churchyard, lying together in the lair with his wife and daughters.

The Board of Longitude, a government body formed in 1714 to administer a scheme of prizes intended to encourage innovators to solve the problem of finding longitude at sea, acknowledged his mathematical contributions and at a dinner in May 1812 he was given the freedom of the Burgh of Dumfries. A local paper reported that a "Dinner given by the Pupils of Messrs. White & Kennedy " on 5 May 1812 with the presentation to each of the masters of a service of silver-plate and china. The gift to White bore an inscription presented by his scholars, pursuing their fortunes in different parts of the world, in testimony of the high sense they entertain of his private worth & indefatigable exertions in the discharge of his professional duties in the town of Dumfries during the period of thirty years."

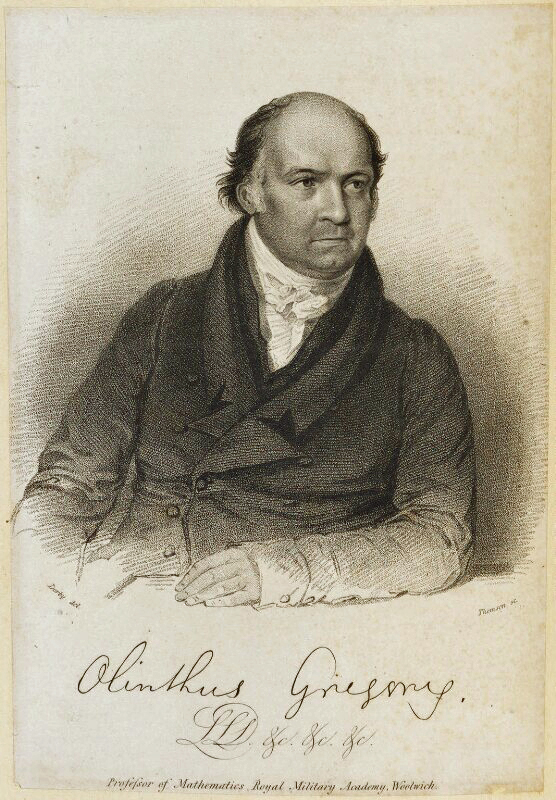
Dr Olinthus Gregory

John M'Diarmid wrote of him "This excellent man and profound mathematician ... well deserved the compliment that was once paid him - namely, that he added originality to talent, and was almost the only man of his day that was qualified to represent Dumfries in the legislature of science ... Though fond of reading and possessed of various and extensive knowledge, mathematical science was evidently his forte; and I believe I hazard nothing in saying that in the higher department of that severe study he had few equals and no superiors. If proof of this were wanting, it would be found in his valuable contributions to the scientific journals published in London and the correspondence with some of the most learned men in the country... as a man, he has not left an honester behind him."

"... at certain intervals he was fond of unbending; he possessed a certain taste for music and poetry; and, what is rather remarkable, wooed the muses with considerable success in various patriotic and most loyal effusions.

He wrote a poetical work "Saint Guerdun's Well" that ran to two editions. The first edition was published anonymously in 1795 in pamphlet form and priced at one shilling, the second (quarto) in 1797 has 918 lines of blank verse, 300 more than the first edition. The subject was suggested by pieces of cloth hanging at a clootie well now known as Saint Queran's Holy Well, at Islesteps, Dumfries. In the second edition White explained that "except at intervals of necessary relaxation, his professional duties permit not the bewitching intrusion of fancy or of imagination"; and of the poem he says that "as it is unaided by either literary friendship or the influence of a veteran name, it must either hasten at once to oblivion or steal into notice by the favourable and slow but unerring judgment of the public."

"If he had a fault at all, it consisted in a certain decision of character which never suffered him to conceal his sentiments, and particularly on political topics, even where silence could not possibly have implied acquiesence. Among strangers a feeling of this kind may have lent a case of sterness to his manner, but his friends, who knew his sterling integrity, overlooked a failing which 'lent to virtue's side' and even where they differed from him, uniformly acknowledged that his heart was as warm as his head was clear."

Dr Olinthus Gregory (29 January 1774 – 2 February 1841), an eminent mathematician, was a regular and long term correspondent with White and said of him that "I had formed a high estimate of his talents and aquirements, and, what is more gratifying, an exalted estimate of his private character and his virtues. His abilities, both as speculative and as a practical Mathematician, were of no common order; yet he had so confined his inquiries to scientific topics as to permit himself to remain ignorant of other useful departments of knowledge, but was, I have always judged, a man of tolerably extensive rending of correct and elegant taste."

== Association with Robert Burns ==
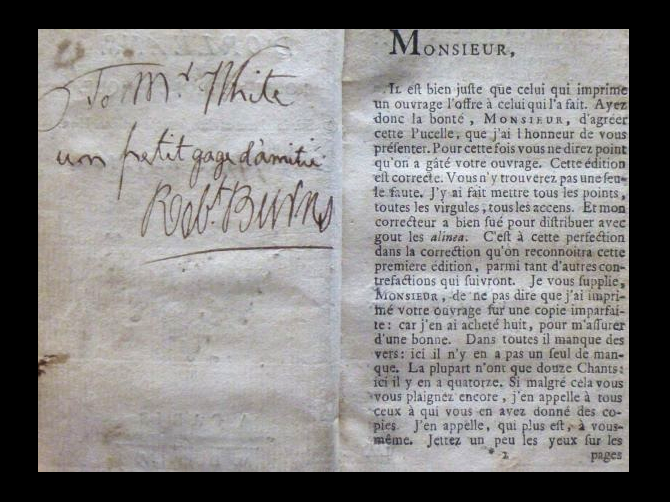
Burns's inscription to Thomas White in his volume of Voltaire's 'La Pucelle'

White was a second lieutenant, and like Burns, a founder member,

in the Royal Dumfries Volunteers He was present at the meeting, in the Court House on 31 January 1795, of "sundry gentlemen, inhabitants of the town of Dumfries," at which it was agreed to establish the corps. He was allocated the district between the bank vennel on the west side of the street up to Townhead. His commissions was gazetted by the war office on 24 March 1795.

Burns is said to have regularly breakfasted with the White family on Saturday mornings. It is recorded that on one of the last occasions Mrs White asked about his health and Burns replied "Hastening to the grave, Madam." The table used by Burns and the White family on these occasions was obtained by the Dumfries Burns Club and is displayed on loan to the Burns House Museum.

White was a close and loyal friend of Burns, promoting his works, etc., even throughout the time when Burns's political opinions were creating problems for those who knew him well.

Following Burns death White wrote a fitting obituary that was published in the "Dumfries Journal" of 26 July 1796 "His manly form and penetrating eye strikingly indicated extraordinary mental vigour. For original wit, for condenensed ridicule, rapidity of conception, and fluency of nervous phraseology he was unrivall'd. Animated by the fire of nature, he uttered sentiments which melted the heart to tenderness by their pathos or expanded the mind by their sublimity; as a luminary emerging from behind a cloud, he arose at once into notice; and his works and his name can never die while divine poesy shall agitate the chords of the human heart."

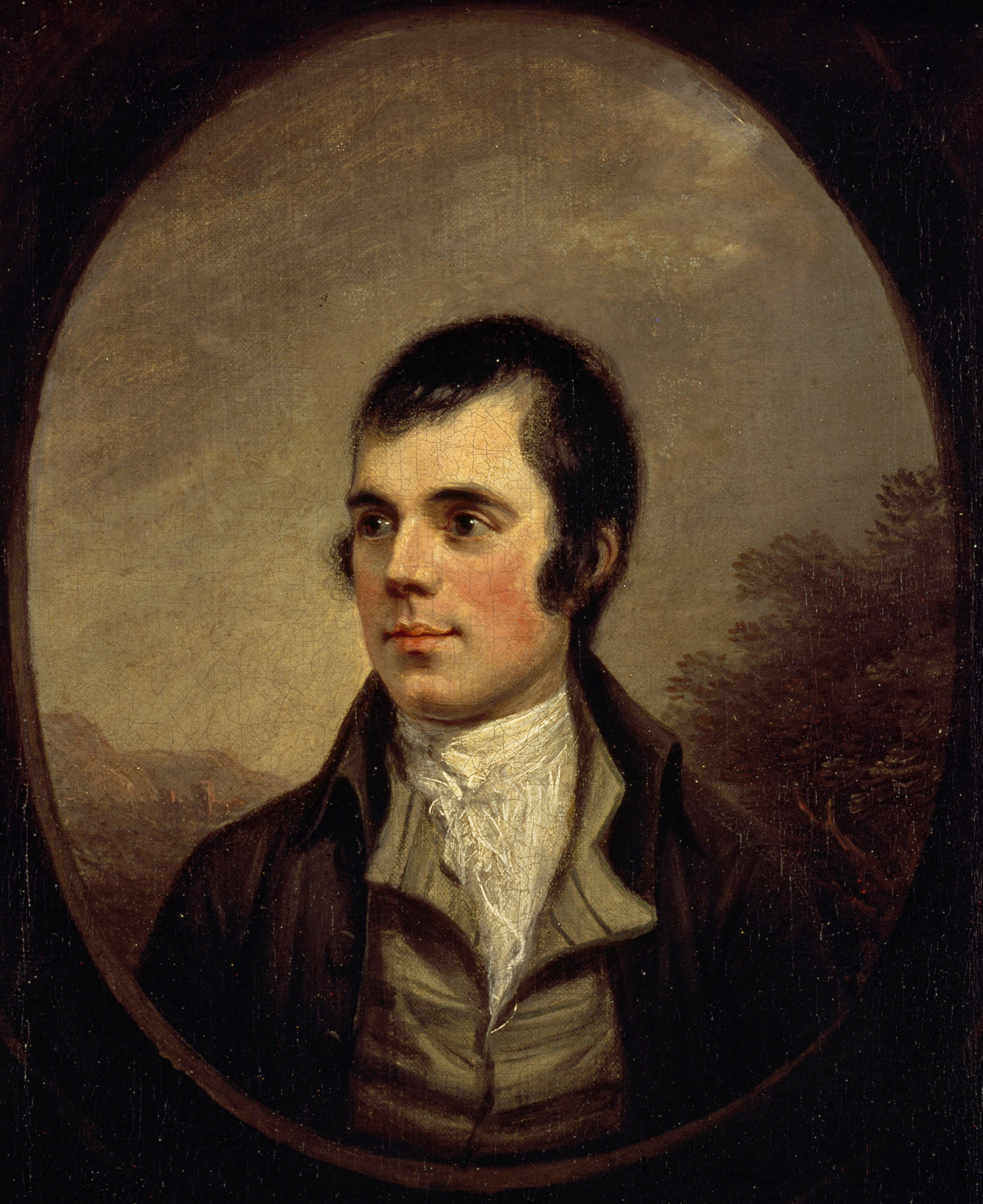
Full view of the Naysmith portrait of 1787, Scottish National Portrait Gallery

White wrote to the 'Royal Literary Fund' of behalf of Jean Armour, "The improvidence of genius is proverbial; and to the list of men of genius by whom pecuniary attentions have been neglected, the name of Robert Burns must, unfortunately for his family, be added." resulting in the award of a grant of £25 in 1796 and £20 in 1801." John Syme wrote an accompanying letter saying that White was ".. an intimate of the late Bard and has testified his regard to his memory."

White is supposed to have testified to the interest Burns took in his children's schooling.

== Literary work ==
He also composed the epistle "A Tribute to the Memory of Robert Burns" which was printed as a broadside. The tribute was positive, however the final lines have been open to interpretation, namely "Upon his frailties gathering clouds descend, To veil all, save the POET and the FRIEND!" It has been suggested that the frailties mentioned were his loose tongue, rather than an addiction to drink and that his indiscretions were as a result of unbridled passion.

=== Presentations ===
Burns gave White a copy of his 1793 edition of his poems Poems, Chiefly in the Scottish Dialect (Second Edinburgh Edition) and inscribed within it the words "Mr White will accept of this book as a mark of the most sincere Friendship, from a man who has ever had too much respect for his Friends, and too much contempt for his enemies, to flatter the one or the other - The Author." The volume is held by the Widener Library at Harvard University.

Burns also presented White with his personal copy of Voltaire's rare La Pucelle (Paris, 1775) which is still extant. Inscribed on the reverse of the title page is: "To Mr. White, un petit gage d'amitié, Robt. Burns." This volume was sold at a 1928 auction in London for £80. A signature on the other side of the same leaf is "Wm. White" who could William have been a son or grandson of Thomas, adding his signature some years later.

== See also ==
- Jean Armour
- John Murdoch (teacher)
