= Dougie Sharpe =

Scottish footballer (1926–1974)

Dougie Sharpe (1926–1974) was a Scottish footballer who played as a right-back for Queen of the South from the town of Dumfries.

== Early years ==
Dougie Sharpe was a native of New Abbey. He played for St Michael's Primary School team in Dumfries and then Dumfries Academy before joining local amateur side Greystone Rovers. In the last football season before World War II Sharpe joined Queen of the South on amateur forms. However the war meant his football career was put on hold as he joined the RAF serving in North Africa.

== Queen of the South ==
Sharpe re-joined Queens in 1946 after World War Two ended on professional forms. Sharpe was one of the finest full backs to have played for the football club. Sharpe always played with great passion and gave 100%. He debuted at left half but was soon switched to the position that he is always remembered for at right full back.

When Dougie Sharpe arrived at Queens, already at the club was Scotland cap Billy Houliston, who joined Queens in 1945. Goalkeeper Roy Henderson joined the same year as Sharpe in 1946. In 1949 Jim Patterson joined the football club. Patterson would go on to score 251 goals in 14 seasons and become Queen of the South's record goalscorer. Fellow left full back Jimmy Binning joined in 1951 and goal scoring winger Bobby Black joined in 1952. At different levels all six would be selected to represent Scotland except Henderson who was selected six times as reserve goalkeeper.

Dougie Sharpe's time at Queens includes:

- Queens points of note in the late 1940s
- The 1950 Scottish Cup semi final and other creditable Scottish Cup runs
- The 1950s and Queens best era

This was under the management of Jimmy McKinnell Junior.

Dougie Sharpe's fine performances were recognised with a call up in February 1952 to represent Scotland versus The Army in Newcastle. Fate intervened when Sharpe was unable to play having suffered concussion against Hearts the week before. However his time would come the following autumn in Belfast when he played versus the Irish League.

Sharpe was with Queen of the South for twenty years and made 431 appearances for the club.

Sharpe is 5th highest in the club's record appearances list behind Allan Ball, Iain McChesney, Jim Patterson and Jackie Oakes.

== Later years and death ==
At the age of 48, Sharpe died in 1974.
