= Don Peattie =

English footballer

Personal information
- Full name: Donald Simpson Peattie
- Date of birth: 5 April 1963 (age 63)
- Place of birth: Baildon, England
- Height: 6 ft 0 in (1.83 m)
- Position: Forward

Senior career*
Years	Team	Apps	(Gls)
19??–1984	Gretna		
1984–1986	Sheffield United	5	(0)
1986	→ Doncaster Rovers (loan)	4	(0)
1986–198?	Newcastle Blue Star		
- North Shields
- * Club domestic league appearances and goals

Donald Simpson Peattie (born 5 April 1963) is a Scottish former professional association footballer who played as a forward.

Peattie was born in Baildon. He was on the books of Northern League club Gretna before signing for Sheffield United of the Second Division in 1984. He made five league appearances for the club in the 1984–85 season, and another four the following season for Third Division club Doncaster Rovers, whom he joined on loan as injury cover. After leaving United he returned to the Northern League, first with Newcastle Blue Star and later with North Shields.

Off the pitch Peattie developed a career in sports education. He became head of sport at the City of Sunderland College and head of education and welfare at Sunderland A.F.C.'s Academy.
