= Tommy McCall =

Scottish footballer

Tommy McCall was a Scottish professional footballer, who played as a left winger.

== Queen of the South ==
When McCall was with Queen of the South, he achieved the Scottish record for goalscoring in a season for his position. The left winger scored 32 goals in season 1932-33. Queens ended that particular league campaign with a 2–1 away victory over the division champions Hibernian, earning promotion to the top flight of Scottish football as the division's runners-up, with McCall scoring one of the goals in that match.

McCall is the ninth highest goalscorer in the club's history with 93 goals.
