= Willie Ferguson (footballer, born 1901) =

Scottish footballer and manager

Personal information
- Full name: William Copeland Ferguson
- Date of birth: 13 February 1901
- Place of birth: Muirkirk, Scotland
- Date of death: 31 August 1960 (aged 59)
- Place of death: Dumfries, Scotland
- Height: 5 ft 6 in (1.68 m)
- Positions: Outside left; left half

Senior career*
Years	Team	Apps	(Gls)
–	Kello Rovers		
1921–1922	Queen of the South		
1922–1933	Chelsea	272	(11)
1933	St Bernard's		
1933–1937	Queen of the South	79	(3)
Total		351	(14)

Managerial career
- 1937–1938: Queen of the South
- * Club domestic league appearances and goals

William Copeland Ferguson (13 February 1901 – 31 August 1960) was a Scottish footballer and manager best known for his time at Chelsea and Dumfries side Queen of the South. His position was usually as a left winger.

== Early years ==
Ferguson was born in Muirkirk, Ayrshire to Daniel Ferguson, a coal miner, and Barbara, née Brown. He was still a child when his family moved to Kirkconnel, where he started in football with local junior side Kello Rovers.

== Queen of the South (1st spell) ==
Willie Ferguson first joined fledgling Queen of the South in nearby Dumfries during season 1921–22, their third season after formation. Ferguson was the fourth of the players at the club in its first three seasons who would go on build successful careers in England's top division. The others were Dave Halliday, Ian Dickson and Hughie Gallacher. Ferguson failed to complete the season at Queens as his talents attracted big name attention.

== Chelsea ==
Ferguson signed for London club Chelsea. Between then and his departure in 1933 he made 294 first team appearances scoring 11 goals.

The club were relegated in 1923–24 and in four of the next five seasons were to narrowly miss out on promotion, finishing 5th, 3rd, 4th and 3rd. They finally reached the First Division again in 1929–30, where they were to remain for the next 32 years.

To capitalise on the 1930 promotion, Chelsea spent £25,000 ($49,000) on three big-name players; Scots Hughie Gallacher, Alex Jackson and Alec Cheyne. Though the team sometimes clicked, trophies remained elusive through the decade. Some felt money was too often spent on inappropriate players, especially forwards, while the defence remained neglected.

The FA Cup was to be the closest the club came to silverware. In 1932, the team secured impressive wins over Liverpool and Sheffield Wednesday, but lost out to Newcastle United in the semi-finals.

== St Bernard's ==
Ferguson returned to Scotland mid season and played 17 games in the second part of 1932–33 with St Bernard's F.C.

== Queen of the South (2nd spell) ==
Ferguson re-joined Queen of the South as the club's notable signing in the summer of 1933 ahead of the club's debut season in Scottish Football's top division. They had been promoted as runners up to Hibernian the season before. Willie's brother Pearson Ferguson played five games for Queens between January and April of the previous season. The two never played in the same Queens team together.

As a player Ferguson was part of two landmark events in the history of Queen of the South:-

- Queens highly successful first season in the top division finishing 4th – their highest finish to date. Queens also made it to the quarter finals of the Scottish Cup for the first time (a feat the club now counts into double figures).
- He was part of the 16 player squad for the 11 game 1936 overseas tour and the Algiers invitational tournament. Queens returned with the trophy after beating Racing de Santander in the final

Other players at the club during this time included Willie Savage, Willie Culbert, Joe Tulip and Irish international Laurie Cumming.

After combining playing with coaching the reserve side in the last year and earning much praise Ferguson took over from George McLachlan as Queens manager in 1937. Ferguson gave Jackie Oakes his first team debut shortly after taking over. Ferguson's most notable result as manager was at Ibrox Park, the first time when Queens condemned Rangers to a league defeat (Queens had condemned Rangers to a Scottish Cup defeat the season before at Palmerston Park). Phil Watson in 1938 was another player signed by Ferguson.

A popular figure at the club it was a surprise when he announced his resignation in the summer of 1938. Ferguson wanted to focus on his confectionery and tobacconist business recently acquired from ex Queens goalkeeper George Woods. All of Ferguson's time at Queens was spent in Scotland's top division (excluding war time interruption Queens spent only one season out of the top division between 1933 and 1959).

He was succeeded as manager on 2 July 1938 by Jimmy McKinnell Sr, the day on which Ferguson's contracted was terminated after his resignation.

== Later years ==
Willie Ferguson owned the tobacconist shop on Great King St in Dumfries, where he died of a massive pulmonary embolism in 1960. His son Chris ran the business until the early 1990s.
