= Lex Law =

Scottish footballer

Lex Law was a Scottish professional footballer, who spent a decade with Queen of the South as an inside left.

== Queen of the South ==
Lex Law is from a family with multiple Queen of the South connections. His father, Jackie Law, Sr, played for Queens in a war interrupted career from season 1937–38 to season 1948–49. Jackie Law, Jr was Lex's brother and played for Queens from season's 1962–63 to 1966–67.

Lex Law signed for Queens in 1964 from Kello Rovers. Law was a strong running, versatile player who played in multiple forward positions. He played for the Scottish Professional Youth Team in 1965 v Italy and Yugoslavia in the UEFA Under Championships in Germany. Law was also the subject of numerous transfer enquiries during his career but remained loyal to Queens with his last season at Palmerston Park being 1975–76.

Lex and Jackie Jr both scored in the same game in the 7–1 win versus Stenhousemuir Palmerston Park on 24 October 1964. Jackie scored 3 and Lex scored 1 in this game.

Lex Law is 19th in the Queens all-time appearances list with 332 first-team matches. This places him in between George Cloy (334) and Crawford Boyd (321). In the Queens all-time goal-scoring charts, Law is 18th with 68 goals. His father, Jackie Law, Sr is two places ahead of him in 16th with 71 goals. On 1 April 2022, Queens announced that Lex Law had died at the age of 75.
