= Willie Fotheringham =

Scottish footballer and manager

Personal information
- Full name: William Cowan Fotheringham
- Date of birth: 1899
- Place of birth: Larkhall, Scotland
- Date of death: 1981 (aged 81–82)
- Place of death: Paisley, Scotland
- Position: Goalkeeper

Senior career*
Years	Team	Apps	(Gls)
1919–1921	Airdrieonians	81	(0)
1921–1924	Dundee	115	(0)
1924–1927	Morton	105	(0)
1927–1933	St Mirren	163	(0)
1933–1937	Queen of the South	116	(0)
Total		580	(0)

Managerial career
- 1942–1945: St Mirren
- 1945–1948: Cowdenbeath
- 1950–1954: Airdrieonians
- * Club domestic league appearances and goals

William Cowan Fotheringham (1899 – 1981) was a Scottish footballer who played as a goalkeeper. He made over 700 first team league and cup appearances during his career with Dundee, Morton, Queen of the South, Airdrieonians and St Mirren, and was later manager of the latter two clubs as well as Cowdenbeath.

== Playing career ==
=== Airdrieonians ===
A native of Larkhall, Fotheringham joined Airdrieonians in 1919 from hometown junior club Larkhall Thistle. He played 81 matches for Airdrie before departing in summer 1921.

=== Dundee ===
Fotheringham joined Dundee in summer 1921 where in his three-year spell he only missed three out of 118 matches. In his time at Dens Park his team finished in fourth, seventh and fifth in the league table. Their best Scottish Cup run was in the middle of those three seasons when Third Lanark required two replays to eliminate Dundee in the quarter-finals.

Fotheringham also played in a Dundee seven-game end of season tour to Spain in 1923 when the Dee were unbeaten against Athletic Bilbao (two games), Real Madrid (one game) and Valencia (two games) before losing to Barcelona. Fotheringham provided correspondence on that tour for the Dundee Evening Telegraph.

=== Morton ===
Fotheringham joined Morton in 1924. They reached the 1925–26 Scottish Cup quarter-finals, losing to Rangers. He made another 105 appearances at Cappielow before departing in June 1927 for £275.

=== St Mirren ===
He joined St Mirren, playing 183 times for the Buddies. In his six seasons at Love Street his team finished fifth three times, seventh once and eight once. They reached the 1928–29 Scottish Cup semi-finals where again Rangers were his nemesis. In 1931, St Mirren were eliminated in the semi-finals by Motherwell.

=== Queen of the South ===
Fotheringham signed for Dumfries club Queen of the South in 1933, and was part of many landmark events in the club's history including a highly successful first season in the top division finishing fourth – their highest finish to date. Queens also made it to the quarter-finals of the Scottish Cup for the second time. Fotheringham was part of the 16-player squad for the 11-game 1936 overseas tour and the Algiers invitational tournament. Queens returned with the trophy after beating Racing de Santander in the final. He was at the club for the elimination of Rangers from the Scottish Cup in 1937.

In his last season at Queens he saw off a challenge for the goalkeeper's jersey by Reuben Bennett. In one game away to Arbroath, Fotheringham left behind his false teeth in the goalmouth at the ground in error. The teeth were returned to Fotheringham via a fish delivery lorry from Arbroath.

Although he played for 17 seasons in Scotland's top division, Fotheringham was never selected for the national team, nor the League Select team; the closest he came to international recognition was an appearance in the Home Scots v Anglo-Scots trial match in 1923 during his Dundee spell.

== Managerial career ==
In 1942, he returned to Paisley to manage St Mirren and he steered them to winning the Summer Cup the following year against Rangers. While at Love Street he introduced Jimmy Cowan and Willie Telfer into the senior grade. Due to ill health he left the Saints in 1945, soon becoming Cowdenbeath's manager. Five years later he took over the reins at another of his former clubs, Airdrieonians. His stewardship at Broomfield Park terminated in 1954 following the club being relegated.

Fotheringham later on in life scouted for Carlisle United then Queen of the South, bringing George 'Chopper' Dickson to Dumfries.

== See also ==
- List of footballers in Scotland by number of league appearances (500+)
