= Jackie Law Sr. =

Scottish footballer

Jackie Law Sr. (died 1959) was a Scottish professional footballer who played as a striker for Airdrieonians and Queen of the South.

After spending five seasons with Airdrie, Law requested a transfer with Queen of the South the club to gain his services just after the club's George McLachlan managed tour to Europe and Algiers. Law was soon club captain and popular with fans. Like the rest of his contemporaries his professional football career was put on hold in 1939 due to World War Two.

Post war, Scottish football on a national scale was resurrected in 1946, the year Law was given a testimonial by Queens. The testimonial match was against Preston North End at Palmerston Park. His last season at Queens was 1948-49 after which he retired from professional football. Law scored 71 goals for Queens placing him 14th on the club's all time goal-scoring charts. He made 228 Queens first team appearances including 137 league games with Queens in Scotland's top division throughout his time there with the exception of the war interruption.

Law died in 1959. His sons, Jackie Law Jr. and Lex Law both played for Queen of the South. Jackie Jr. played for Queens from season's 1962-63 to 1966-67. Lex Law signed for Queens in 1964 and was there until his last season of 1975-76. Lex Law is 16th place in the Queens all time goal-scoring charts (as at 30 August 2011) two places below his father.
