= Willie Savage =

Scottish footballer (1888–1961)

William Savage
Personal information
- Full name: William Savage
- Date of birth: 1888
- Place of birth: Glasgow, Scotland
- Date of death: 1961 (aged 72–73)
- Place of death: Hamilton, Scotland
- Position: Full back

Senior career*
Years	Team	Apps	(Gls)
1932–1946	Queen of the South	247	(4)
1940–1941	St Mirren (wartime guest)		
1940–1943	Dumbarton (wartime guest)		
1943–1944	Albion Rovers (wartime guest)		
1943–1944	Dundee United (wartime guest)		
- * Club domestic league appearances and goals

William Savage (1888–1961) was a Scottish footballer who played as a full back for Queen of the South from 1932 to 1946.

== Early days ==
Savage was a native of Burnbank, Lanarkshire, who began his football as an inside forward at the local St Cuthbert School and represented Lanarkshire elementary schools against Glasgow. On leaving school he played in the junior league as centre forward for his local club Burnbank. Three seasons later he went to St Cuthbert C.Y.M.S. This was a one-season stay before returning to Burnbank for a further season. The next season, he was with Falkirk side Shieldhill Thistle. He played for the Hamilton 'A' team before rejoining the junior league with Motherwell Juniors.

== Queen of the South ==
Savage signed for Queens from Motherwell Juniors in 1932. He made his debut as a trialist on 1 October 1932 in the 10-0 league thrashing of Bo'ness at Palmerston Park. The result took Queens to the top of the table. A second trial followed two weeks later against Albion Rovers, and he was signed immediately after that game as other clubs took an interest in him.

Savage was one of the mainstays of the team that won Queen of the South promotion to Scotland's top division for the first time in the club's history. They ended season 1932–33 with a victory over Second Division champions Hibernian and finished as runners-up.

As a player, Willie Savage was part of many landmark events in the history of Queen of the South:-

- Queens highly successful first season in the top division finishing 4th – their highest finish to date. Queens also made it to the quarter finals of the Scottish Cup for the first time (a feat the club now counts into double figures).
- He was part of the 16 player squad for the 11 game 1936 overseas tour and the Algiers invitational tournament. Queens returned with the trophy after beating Racing de Santander in the final
- Savage was at the club for the 1937 knocking of Rangers out of the Scottish Cup and finishing 6th in the league in 1939

During World War II, Savage guested for St Mirren, Albion Rovers and Dumbarton. Savage returned to Queens at the end of the war and played with the club until 1947. Savage was a tremendous player and Captain of Queen of the South, playing for the first team 369 times. Savage is 9th highest in the club's record appearances list. Savage was the first ever Queens player to reach 300 first class games, a feat even today achieved by less than 20 players.

Savage was known a full-back who formed a defensive partnership with Willie Culbert. Off the park, he would entertain teammates on away fixture trips by playing the mouth organ.

Among the others at Queens in the 1930s with Savage were fellow players; Willie Culbert, Willie Ferguson, Joe Tulip, Irish international Laurie Cumming and Jackie Oakes. He played under managers George McLachlan, Ferguson as McLachlan's successor and also Jimmy McKinnell Senior.

After the promotion from Savage's first season at Queen of the South 1932–33, all of Savage's Queens career was spent in Scotland's top division.
