= Willie Culbert =

Scottish footballer

Senior career*
Years	Team	Apps	(Gls)
- Clyde
- Queen of the South
- * Club domestic league appearances and goals

Willie Culbert was a Scottish former footballer best known with Dumfries club Queen of the South.

== Queen of the South ==
Willie Culbert was a 1932 Queen of the South signing from Clyde.

Culbert was one of the mainstays of the side that were promoted to the division for the first time when they ended their 1932-33 campaign with a victory over divisional champions Hibs.

As a player Willie Culbert was part of many landmark events in the history of Queen of the South:-

- Queens highly successful first season in the top division finishing 4th - their highest finish to date. Queens also made it to the quarter finals of the Scottish Cup for the first time (a feat the club now counts into double figures).
- He was part of the 16 player squad for the 11 game 1936 overseas tour and the Algiers invitational tournament. Queens returned with the trophy after beating Racing de Santander in the final.
- Savage was at the club for the 1937 knocking of Rangers out of the Scottish Cup and finishing 6th in the league in 1939.

Willie Culbert was slim built and full of craft, a fearless tackler and good with his head. He formed a great partnership with right back Willie Savage through the 1930s. Culbert was rewarded with a testimonial in 1938 v Carlisle Utd.

Among the others at Queens in the 1930s with Savage were fellow players Willie Savage, Willie Ferguson, Joe Tulip, Irish international Laurie Cumming and Jackie Oakes. He played under managers George McLachlan and Ferguson as McLachlan's successor.

After the promotion in Culbert's 1st season all of Culbert's time at Queens was spent in the top division (excluding war time interruption Queens spent every season in the top division following their promotion until 1959 except one).
