= Jackie Oakes =

Scottish footballer

Personal information
- Date of birth: 6 December 1919
- Place of birth: Hamilton, South Lanarkshire, Scotland
- Date of death: 3 December 1995 (aged 75)
- Position: Left winger

Senior career*
Years	Team	Apps	(Gls)
1935–1936	Wolverhampton Wanderers	0	(0)
1936–1947	Queen of the South	79	(16)
1947–1948	Blackburn Rovers	35	(9)
1948–1951	Manchester City	77	(9)
1951–1960	Queen of the South	232	(38)
Total		423	(72)

International career
1945	Scotland (wartime)	1	(0)
- * Club domestic league appearances and goals

John Oakes (6 December 1919 – 3 December 1995) was a Scottish footballer who played for Wolverhampton Wanderers, Queen of the South, Blackburn Rovers and Manchester City. Born in Hamilton, South Lanarkshire, his position was left winger. Oakes died at age 75.

== Early life ==
Oakes was born to Patrick and Annie (née Gaffney) in Hamilton, South Lanarkshire.

== Wolverhampton Wanderers ==
Oakes started his senior football career in England with Wolverhampton Wanderers in 1935 signed by Major Frank Buckley. From official club records, there is no mention of any first-team appearances for Oakes whilst he was at Wolverhampton Wanderers.

== Queen of the South (first spell) ==
In 1936, Oakes signed for Dumfries club Queen of the South for the first time signed by George McLachlan. Players at the club during this time included Willie Savage, Willie Culbert, Willie Ferguson, Joe Tulip and Irish international Laurie Cumming.

His Queens career began with a reserve game against Third Lanark on Christmas Day 1936. His first team debut was on 24 April 1937 with a hint of irony by playing Hamilton Academical. Willie Ferguson had recently become the Queen of the South manager. Oakes at this point played on the right wing despite being ultimately known for playing on the left flank.

Taking a pass from Phil Watson, Oakes opened the scoring in Queens 1937–38 season, with the game ending in a 3–2 victory against Rangers at Ibrox Park. This was Queens first-ever league win against Rangers. Jackie Law scored the other two Queens goals that day.

Oakes was at Queens under Jimmy McKinnell Snr when they finished sixth in the league in 1939.

== Blackburn Rovers ==
Oakes joined Blackburn Rovers in February 1947 after turning down Manchester City. Blackburn Rovers paid £26,000 on three players in an attempt to buy the club out of relegation trouble. These players were Jock Weir, Frank McGorrigan and Oakes.

Oakes made his debut for Blackburn Rovers in the 1–1 draw at home to Derby County on 15 February 1947. He was an ever-present for the remainder of the season, making a total of 16 appearances and scoring two goals. His first goal for the club came against that season's eventual league champions, Liverpool, in a 2–1 defeat at Anfield on 8 March 1947. Oakes' second goal that season came in the 2–0 win against Chelsea at Stamford Bridge on 4 April 1947.

In season 1947–48, Oakes made 19 appearances in the league and two in the FA Cup, both against West Ham United He scored seven league goals. His first of the season was also his first at Ewood Park, in the 4–0 win over Grimsby Town on 20 September 1947. He scored a penalty in the 3–1 win at Maine Road against Manchester City a week later and then made it three goals in as many games after scoring in the 3–2 defeat at home to Preston North End on 4 October 1947. He scored twice, one being a terrific 13th-minute dribble and drive and the other a penalty, as Blackburn Rovers defeated Bolton Wanderers 4–0 on 1 November 1947. He then scored the only goals in defeats to Middlesbrough at home on 29 November 1947 and at Goodison Park against Everton on 20 December 1947. His final appearance for Blackburn Rovers came in the 2–1 defeat at home to Liverpool on 10 April 1948.

In total Oakes played 35 leagues and two FA Cup games for Blackburn Rovers scoring 9 goals. Playing alongside many Blackburn Rovers stalwarts, his best-known teammate was probably the England full-back, Bill Eckersley. As Blackburn Rovers were relegated from the top tier of English football at the end of season 1947–48, Manchester City stepped in to keep Oakes in the top flight.

== Manchester City ==
Oakes joined Manchester City at the start of the season 1948–49, where he lined up alongside Joe Fagan and also two highly distinguished goalkeepers in Frank Swift and Bert Trautmann. When at Manchester City things were never dull. In that first season, he and his fellow Maine Road teammates improved on the previous season's 10th place by finishing 7th. In the F.A. Cup that season Manchester City were defeated in the third round by Everton, now the club of Dumfries born forward Jimmy McIntosh. Manchester City found themselves in another relegation battle during the season 1949–50. Near the season's end and battling for their top-flight survival, Manchester City defeated Sunderland 2–1 and this ultimately cost Sunderland the title. Former Queen of the South player Ivor Broadis played for Sunderland at that particular time. Oakes scored the opening goal and this was the only double league defeat that Sunderland endured all season. This win, unfortunately, was not enough to save Manchester City from relegation.

Manchester City's visit to the second tier of English football, season 1950–51, was to be short-lived, as they were promoted back to the top tier for the start of season 1951–52, as they finished runners-up to Preston North End. Oakes clocked up 77 league appearances in which he scored 9 goals.

== Queen of the South (second spell) ==
During his time at Queen of the South, he played alongside players such as goalkeeper Roy Henderson, forward Jim Patterson, and full-backs Dougie Sharpe and Jimmy Binning

Oakes scored Queens goal in the game with the highest recorded attendance at Palmerston Park. On 23 February 1952 a staggering crowd of 26,552 squeezed very tightly in to see Queens play in a Scottish Cup third round 3–1 win for Hearts.

Late in his Queen of the South career, Oakes was joined by Ivor Broadis, previously of Oakes' tussles for Manchester City against Sunderland. Oakes played in the 7–1 Boxing Day win against Queen's Park in 1959. Ivor Broadis scored four of the goals in this match. Sir Alex Ferguson was the Queen's Park scorer. Sir Alex Ferguson recalled this match recently by saying "The other reason I remember that game was due to the average age of the Queen of the South forward line, which was probably about 34, with Black, Broadis, Patterson, Dunlop, and Oakes playing. I remember it all too well."

Shortly after in February 1960, Oakes was joined on the playing staff by another ex-opponent from his days in England's top division, goalkeeper George Farm.

Twenty three years after his debut, Oakes played at Queens until the age of 40 in 1960, clocking up a total of 457 games for the club. Oakes is fourth highest in the club's record appearances list behind Allan Ball and Iain McChesney and in between team-mates Jim Patterson and Dougie Sharpe. Oakes is twelfth in the Doonhamers all-time goalscoring charts with 81 goals. With the exception of his last season in Dumfries, Oakes time as a Queens player was spent in Scotland's top flight. Oakes then replaced Neil Gibson Junior to become the club trainer for three years.
