= Laurie Cumming =

Irish footballer and journalist

Personal information
- Full name: Laurence Stanley Slater Cumming
- Date of birth: 10 April 1905
- Place of birth: Derry, Ireland
- Date of death: 19 November 1980 (aged 75)
- Height: 5 ft 11 in (1.80 m)
- Position: Inside forward

Senior career*
Years	Team	Apps	(Gls)
1926–1927	Alloa Athletic	28	(13)
1927–1929	Huddersfield Town	19	(6)
1929–1930	Oldham Athletic	25	(11)
1930–1931	Southampton	20	(4)
1931–1933	Alloa Athletic		
1933–1938	Queen of the South	96	(47)
	St Mirren	0	(0)
1938–1939	Hamilton Academical	4	(1)

International career
1929	Ireland	3	(0)
- * Club domestic league appearances and goals

Laurence Stanley Slater Cumming (10 April 1905 – 19 November 1980) was a professional footballer and journalist, born in Derry, Ireland. Cumming played for Alloa Athletic, Huddersfield Town, Oldham Athletic, Southampton, Queen of the South, St Mirren and Hamilton Academical. All of his international appearances were at inside-left, though at club level he was capable of switching between the number eight and ten shirts.

5 foot 11 and 12 stone 4, Laurie Cumming's sand dancing, clever ball control and finishing ability made him a great attraction wherever he played. To quote one newspaper report: "His pirouetting, Charlie Chaplin swagger and complete control of the ball.... left us longing to see ten of his kind."

== Playing career ==
=== Club ===
Cumming joined Huddersfield in March 1927.

In season 1928-29 Cumming was equal fourth top scorer for Huddersfield with six goals along with Bob Kelly. Those who scored more were George Brown, Alex Jackson and Johnny Dent. These were Cumming's only goals for the club in his 19 appearances.

It was while at Huddersfield that he gained his first two full international caps. At Oldham he gained his third and final cap.

Cumming was transferred to Southampton in June 1930 for £500, making his Saints debut in a 5–0 defeat by Preston North End on the opening day of the season, followed by a spell of four goals in nine games, including a brace in an away win over Plymouth Argyle. As winter set in and the pitches grew heavier his form dried up, and he never once found the net again in the Football League. He was dropped in February 1931, losing his place to Peter Dougall. At the end of the season, Cumming was placed on the transfer list at his own request.

Cumming returned to Scotland with Alloa in 1931 on a non-contract basis.

Cumming joined Dumfries side Queen of the South in the autumn of 1933 in the club's debut season in Scottish Football's top division. Queens had been promoted as runners up to Hibernian the season before.

As a player Cumming was part of two landmark events in the history of Queen of the South: Queens highly successful first season in the top division finishing 4th - their highest finish to date. Queens also made it to the quarter finals of the Scottish Cup for the first time (a feat the club now counts into double figures).

- He was part of the 16 player squad for the 11 game 1936 overseas tour and the Algiers invitational tournament. Queens returned with the trophy after beating Racing de Santander in the final. Queens were managed by George McLachlan at the time of this adventure. Cumming was the tour's top scorer. Other players at the club during this time included Willie Savage, Willie Culbert, Willie Ferguson and Joe Tulip.

On 30 January 1937 with Cumming playing, Queen of the South condemned Rangers to a 1–0 first round Scottish Cup exit. Cumming was at Queens until March 1937 making 105 appearances and scoring 55 goals. The club remained in the top division throughout his time at Palmerston Park. He then had short spells at St Mirren and Hamilton Academical.

=== International ===
Cumming was capped three times for Ireland. In the second of these Hughie Gallacher, previously a Queen of the South player, hit five goals for Scotland.

#	Date	Opponent	Result
1	2 February 1929	Wales	Wales 2 – 2 Ireland
2	23 February 1929	Scotland	Ireland 3 – 7 Scotland
3	19 October 1929	England	England 3 – 0 Ireland

== After football ==
After retiring from playing, Cumming worked as a newspaper reporter and wrote for the Scottish edition of the Daily Express for many years. He was a founder member of the Scottish Football Writers' Association (SFWA). In 1974 Laurie joined Glasgow Rangers as a scout and was responsible for spotting midfielder Bobby Russell from Shettleston Juniors.

Laurie Cumming died in 1980.
