= Joe Tulip =

English footballer

Joe Tulip (died 1979) was an English footballer best known for his time at Dumfries club Queen of the South.

== Career ==
Tulip was one of the first Englishmen to play in the Scottish League. His discovery was quite unique as he was spied by a Dumfries policeman on holiday in the north of England who then recommended him to the Queens directors. He was snapped up and made his debut on 11 November 1933 against Rangers at Palmerston. This was Queens first season in Scotland's top division following promotion the previous season with Hibs.

As a player Joe Tulip was part of two landmark events in the history of Queen of the South:

- Queens highly successful first season in the top division finishing 4th – their highest finish to date. Queens also made it to the quarter-finals of the Scottish Cup for the first time (a feat the club now counts into double figures).
- He was part of the 16-player squad for the 11-game 1936 overseas tour and the Algiers invitational tournament. Queens returned with the trophy after beating Racing de Santander in the final

After scoring the only goal against Celtic at Celtic Park on 23 December 1933 the billboards for the Glasgow evening press ran with the headline, "Tulip tiptoes through the shamrocks". The result gave Queens a double victory that season over Celtic as they did also against Hibs and Hearts.

Among the others at Queens at the same time as Tulip were fellow players Willie Savage, Willie Culbert, Willie Ferguson and Irish international Laurie Cumming. The managers he played under included George McLachlan and Ferguson as McLachlan's successor.

Joe Tulip made 129 appearances scoring 43 goals, some from the penalty spot. All of Tulip's time at Queens was spent in the top division (excluding war time interruption Queens spent every season in the top division following their promotion until 1959 except one).
