= Billy Houliston =

Scottish footballer

Personal information
- Full name: William Houliston
- Date of birth: 4 April 1921
- Place of birth: Maxwelltown, Scotland
- Date of death: 10 February 1999 (aged 77)
- Position: Centre forward

Youth career
- Crichton

Senior career*
Years	Team	Apps	(Gls)
1945–1952	Queen of the South	120	(60)
1952–1953	Berwick Rangers		
1953	Third Lanark	1	(0)

International career
1948–1949	Scotland	3	(2)
1948–1949	Scottish Football League XI	4	(3)
- * Club domestic league appearances and goals

William Houliston (4 April 1921 – 10 February 1999) was a Scottish footballer who played for Crichton, Queen of the South, Berwick Rangers, Third Lanark and the Scotland national team.

== Early years ==
Houliston was born in Maxwelltown, at Westpark Cottages, where he lived for a short while before his family moved to a house at the Crichton in Dumfries. He played for Brownhall Primary School in the Dumfries and District Primary School League at centre half, and represented the League in cup matches against other areas. Houliston's secondary school was Dumfries High School where he played only occasionally. On leaving school, he stopped playing completely.

Aged 17, working as a nurse at the Crichton Royal Hospital, Houliston started playing again. It was while playing for the Crichton team that he moved from defence to attack, playing at either inside or centre forward.

In 1941 Houliston was called up for national service. He joined RAF Coastal Command as a wireless operator. In his four years' service, Houliston was attached to 16 different stations where he represented each at football. Playing in the Arbroath area, the local side offered to sign him. On leave back in Dumfries, Houliston declined the offer when taking the offer of a trial game for Queen of the South reserves.

== Queen of the South ==
After an unremarkable debut against Falkirk 'A', Houliston scored in a 4–1 victory over Celtic reserves. Like many that he was to score, his goal was eye-catching: chasing a long ball upfield, Houliston beat a defender, then drew the Celtic goalkeeper out and chipped the ball over his outstretched leg and ran around him. With the keeper stranded, putting the ball into the net was a formality. Houliston was offered a contract, and a month later he made his first team debut, on 13 October 1945 away to Morton.

Nicknamed "Basher" from his 'afraid of no one' attitude, Houliston was the idol of Palmerston Park in the late 1940s. His all-action style made him a handful for defences everywhere. In early 1948, Celtic offered a big fee to take him to Parkhead but Houliston was happy to stay with Queens.

Houliston played a major part in Queens' run to the semi-final of the 1949–50 Scottish Cup in which Aberdeen were overcome in a replay, before a narrow defeat to Rangers at Hampden Park, again after a replay.

During Houliston's time as a Queen of the South player they spent only one season out of the top division of Scottish football; that was 1950–51 when they were promoted straight back to the top flight as B Division champions. The success of that season was enhanced by a run to the semi-final of the Scottish League Cup. After a serious ankle injury sustained while on tour with Scotland, Houliston was never the same player again. He was released by Queen of the South in July 1952, with a tally of 60 league goals in 120 league games.

=== Berwick Rangers and Third Lanark ===
While holidaying in Blackpool, Houliston was pursued by dignitaries of Berwick Rangers; a contract was offered and Houliston signed while still on holiday. He spent only one season at Berwick where fate meant the club were drawn to play against Queen of the South in the Scottish Cup: a last minute goal gave Queens a 3–2 victory. He then had a brief spell with Third Lanark before retiring in 1953.

== International career ==
On 14 January 1948 Houliston gained his first international recognition, playing for the Scottish League XI v the Irish League XI at Celtic Park. Playing beside George Young, Sammy Cox, Torry Gillick, Willie Ormond and Gordon Smith, Houliston scored twice in the 3–0 victory. His first goal was a header from a corner kick, the second a brilliant shot from just inside the box. On 24 March he represented the Scottish League again, this time against their English counterparts, and was selected twice more against the League of Ireland XI.

On 17 November 1948, Houliston made his full international debut for Scotland against Ireland at Hampden Park. The opposition were 2–0 up inside five minutes; 22 minutes later Houliston met the ball on the turn 10 yards from the goal and rifled the ball into the Irish net. A through pass to Jimmy Mason brought the equaliser. For the next goal Houliston passed the ball wide to Willie Waddell and kept moving goalwards, then met the winger's cross with a bullet header to complete the comeback. Five months later Houliston played against England at Wembley. His robust style of play discomforted the English defenders, attracting boos from the home fans and post-match criticism from the local press. Scotland returned north with a 3–1 win. Houliston's last full cap was at Hampden in the 2–0 win over France at the end of April 1949.

Scotland toured the USA in the summer of 1949, with the matches not being considered official internationals. Houliston netted twice in St Louis in a 6–0 win against the All Stars XI, and another goal followed against the American Soccer League XI in New York City. However a serious ankle injury brought Houlston's involvement in the tour to a premature end; he journeyed home on the RMS Queen Mary without his teammates to have an operation. In all, he collected nine caps at different levels and never played in a losing Scotland side; he is the only serving Queen of the South player to have been selected for full international duty.

=== International caps ===
Scotland's score listed first.

#	Date	Opponent	Result	Competition
1	17 November 1948	Ireland	3–2	1949 British Home Championship
2	9 April 1949	England	3–1	1949 British Home Championship
3	27 April 1949	France	2–0	Friendly match

== After playing ==
Houliston first went into the licensing trade in 1949 when opening Billy's Bar on Dumfries High Street. He continued in this business until the 1980s with the Nith Hotel at Glencaple.

Houliston became a director at Queen of the South in 1957 and was later chairman for several years, winning promotion to Division One with the early 1960s team of player manager George Farm, Neil Martin, Ernie Hannigan and the now veteran Jim Patterson.
