= Roy Henderson (footballer) =

Scottish footballer

Personal information
- Full name: Roy Donald Henderson
- Date of birth: 7 June 1923
- Place of birth: Wishaw, Scotland
- Date of death: 16 January 1997 (aged 73)
- Place of death: Dumfries, Scotland
- Position: Goalkeeper

Senior career*
Years	Team	Apps	(Gls)
- Carluke Amateurs
- Lanark United
1943–1946	Third Lanark	0	(0)
1946–1958	Queen of the South	291	(0)
- * Club domestic league appearances and goals

Roy Donald Henderson (7 June 1923 – 16 January 1997) was a Scottish footballer who played as a goalkeeper, best known for his time with Dumfries club Queen of the South.

== Career ==
=== Early years ===
A native of Law, South Lanarkshire, Henderson played for Carluke Amateurs, Lanark United and Third Lanark and was a guest player for Aberdeen during the World War II, where he played one game a week for the club and one for his army unit (where he was the sergeant PT instructor). His form attracted attention, and Jimmy McKinnell Junior signed him for Queen of the South in July 1946.

=== Queen of the South ===
Henderson spent eleven seasons with Queen of the South, making 381 first team appearances – he is ranked 8th in the club's record appearances list. His time at Palmerston Park included the club's notable period in the late 1940s, a run to the semi-finals of the 1949–50 Scottish Cup and other creditable cup runs, and the best era in Queens' history in the 1950s.

Henderson had one of his finest matches in the 1950 Scottish Cup semi-final, a 1–1 draw against Rangers at Hampden Park where one press article said, "The Henderson of the first half was not just another 'keeper having a good day. He was a man living his finest moment". Another reported, "It was not just the shutters that he put up – he practically bricked up his goal against the Rangers forwards".

During Henderson's time at Queen of the South they would spend only one season out of the top division of Scottish football: 1950–51, when they were promoted straight back to the top flight as Scottish B Division Champions. That season a run to the semi-final of the Scottish League Cup. In February 1951 Henderson remained in Dumfries despite a reported bid by Newcastle United.

At the start of the 1956–57 season, Henderson collided with Charlie Dickson and broke his leg during a League Cup match against Dunfermline Athletic. He missed most of that season, then returned briefly but was soon forced to retire from playing altogether. The club's fortunes also declined after Henderson was no longer in the side. In a 2004 poll in the Dumfries and Galloway Standard, Henderson was voted the greatest ever Queen of the South player.

=== International ===
Henderson was selected as reserve goalkeeper for the Scotland national team six times, but never played ahead of Bobby Brown nor Jimmy Cowan. He has been described as one of be the best Scottish goalkeepers never to gain a cap. In one game, with Henderson on stand-by as reserve, Cowan played with a broken finger worried that Henderson would impress and deny Cowan future selection.

== Personal life and death ==
Henderson died on 16 January 1997, aged 73. His brother George was also a footballer.

On the occasion of his widow Jean's 90th birthday on 19 March 2016, their young great-grandchildren were the Doonhamers mascots for a 6–0 win over Dumbarton.
