= Autio =

Autio is a surname. Notable people with the surname include:

- Aino Autio (1932–2022), Finnish sprinter
- Asko Autio (born 1953), Finnish cross-country skier
- Kaarina Autio (1941–2013), Finnish gymnast
- Karen Autio, Finnish-Canadian writer
- Lela Autio (1927–2016), American painter and sculptor
- Narelle Autio (born 1969), Australian photographer
- Rudy Autio (1926–2007), American sculptor
- Veli Autio (1909–1993), Finnish rower
