= McKinnell =

McKinnell is a surname. Notable people with the surname include:

- Catherine McKinnell (born 1976), British Labour Party politician
- Henry McKinnell (born 1943), former CEO and chairman of Pfizer Inc
- Jimmy McKinnell (footballer) (1893–1972), Scottish footballer
- Jimmy McKinnell Sr. (died 1965), manager of Scottish football club Queen of the South
- Jimmy McKinnell Jr. (died 1995), secretary and manager of Queen of the South
- Nan Bangs McKinnell (1913–2012), American ceramicist and educator
- William McKinnell (1873–1939), politician in Manitoba, Canada
