= Lela Autio =

American painter

- Born: Lela Moniger; April 12, 1927; Great Falls, Montana
- Died: January 23, 2016 (aged 88)
- Education: Montana State University (B.A.); University of Montana (M.A.)
- Known for: Founder, Archie Bray Foundation
- Spouse: Rudy Autio

Lela Autio (April 12, 1927 – January 23, 2016) was a modernist painter and sculptor from Great Falls, Montana, notable as a co-founder of the Archie Bray Foundation in Helena, Montana, and of the Missoula Art Museum

== Background ==
Following her mother's death when she was 3 years old, Autio was raised by her father along with two sisters and one brother. Her brother died in a drowning accident at the age of 8. She graduated from Great Falls High School and attended Montana State College (now Montana State University) with a scholarship, and achieved a B.A. She received an MA in painting and drawing from the University of Montana in 1961 where she was a student of Frances Senska.

For much of her life she lived in Missoula, Montana, and taught at Hellgate High School. Autio held a 10-year teaching position at Hellgate High School, as well as a 3-year position at Head Start and a one-year artist-in-the-schools position in Bozeman.

Her husband Rudy Autio was a ceramicist. Lela was also the family's business manager. The couple raised four children, two of whom, Chris and Lisa Autio, are also artists. Autio was said to be proud of all four of her children. Lela Autio was described as lively and joyous. Susan Ridgeway, Autio’s daughter-in-law, said “Life didn’t happen to Lela. Lela took charge of life.” Autio was headstrong and spoke her mind, once described as: “She was no bullshit gal”.

Autio died in 2016 of kidney cancer which rapidly spread to her lungs. She continued to work on her art until illness forced her to stop.

== Art career ==
Autio started as a painter but moved to other mediums when paint didn’t live up to her own expectations. Autio created abstract soft sculpture works before any artist in the country gained wide recognition in the medium, making her an innovative figure in the field. Not all of her work was in the medium of ceramics. She began working on theatrical costumes as a high school student. Over her life she created objects, usually wall hangings, and sculptural assemblages made from fabric, plexiglas, mylar, and plastic. Her soft sculptures draw on the tradition of Claes Oldenburg though they rarely depict identifiable objects. More often they create environmental spaces or theatrical interiors.

Autio also created a number of paintings early in her career of landscapes and individuals from her community of Montana artists. In the 1950s her paintings were influenced by Abstract Expressionism as well as by latter day Impressionism. Her husband Rudy Autio also credited her with his introduction to Matisse, which would influence the three dimensional decor he added to his ceramic vessels. Her pieces are notable for their use of color and shape, as well as their freedom from regional themes and dogma. Autio was a proud modernist. She was quoted as saying “I never did a popular, traditional painting of horse and elk and all that sort of thing. I always did abstract expressionism”.

Her work was exhibited in many shows, including a faculty exchange of the University of Montana with the People's Republic of China in Hangzhou in 1983, Montana Current Ideas, the Yellowstone Art Center, 1986, Judy Chicago/Lela Autio, Paris Gibson Square, Great Falls, 1987, The Manipulated Thread at the Missoula Museum of the Arts, 1988 and the Missoula Artists' Exchange Exhibition in Oaxaca, Mexico, 1989. Her art was also the subject of a career survey in 2000 which was shown at the Missoula Art Museum and the Holter Museum of Art in Helena. In 2012, three Plexiglass pieces by Autio were selected for a statewide survey of contemporary art known as the Montana Triennial.

== Legacy ==
Lela and Rudy Autio, along with Peter Voulkos, helped found the Archie Bray Foundation in Helena, Montana. She was an artist in residence at the Archie Bray for five years during which time she taught classes and made pottery. She also contributed to the transformation of the Archie Bray from a brickyard to a ceramics art center with an international reputation before moving to Missoula in 1957. Autio also helped to found the Missoula Art Museum in the former Carnegie Library. She was instrumental in obtaining a lease for the Museum building.

Autio was an advocate for art, women, the disenfranchised and many more marginalized groups. She supported many artists' work and non-profits including libraries and museums. She was motivated by her frustration that the work of women artists went unacknowledged. Lela was declined the opportunity to show her work at the University of Montana because of her gender.

She received a MAM award in 2011 for her contributions, and received the Governor's Arts Award in 2015 from the Montana Arts Council. According to ceramicist Joshua DeWeese, “Lela has played an important role in the development of the contemporary art scene in Montana. Her work has always challenged the traditional ideas of western representational art prevalent in the state, from the early abstract paintings, to the fabric ‘pop art’ sculpture created in the 70s, to the latest bold primary-colored plexiglas assemblages."

Lela also published an autobiographical book titled "From Paint To Plexi" that details her journey as an artist along with other influential artists for her career, and also elaborates on the development of contemporary art in Montana.
