= Missoula Art Museum =

Contemporary art museum in Missoula, Montana

The Missoula Art Museum (MAM) is a contemporary art museum in Missoula, Montana. MAM was founded in 1975 as the Missoula Museum for the Arts and has been accredited by the American Alliance of Museums since 1987.

== History ==
When the Missoula Public Library moved to its then-new headquarters on Main Street in 1972, the future of the empty Carnegie Library was in question. Lela Autio organized an exhibit of contemporary textiles — then a pioneering artform — created by Nancy Erickson, Dana Boussard within the space. Autio, Missoula Mayor George Turman and his wife Kay and other community members and artists, organized in support of the conversion of the building to an art museum. The Missoula Museum of the Arts opened in March 1975. In 1987, the museum began actively collecting and accessioning artworks, and was accredited by the American Alliance of Museums. In 1995, the Missoula Museum of the Arts became a 501(c)3 non-profit organization.

In 2006, the newly re-designed building, funded by a $5.3 million capital campaign, fused the 100-year-old Carnegie Library building with a contemporary addition. The Missoula Museum of the Arts officially changed its name to the Missoula Art Museum upon completion of this renovation and expansion. The newly renovated building provides 6000 square feet of exhibitions space.

== Collection ==
In 1987, the museum began actively collecting and accessioning artworks, and was accredited by the American Alliance of Museums. In 1995, the Missoula Museum of the Arts became a 501(c)3 non-profit organization. Within the main collection, the Contemporary American Indian Art Collection (CAIAC) was established in 1997 following a gift of prints by Native American artist Jaune Quick-to-See Smith. It has grown to include artworks by prominent Native American artists like Corwin Clairmont, Gail Tremblay and George Longfish. Today, the CAIAC at MAM is the largest collection of contemporary American Indian art in the state of Montana, and the largest collection of Quick-to-See Smith's work of any museum.

The museum’s location and grassroots origins also contribute to the close relationships with Modernist artists from Montana. Collection highlights include works by Rudy Autio, Frances Senska, Lela Autio, and Robert and Gennie DeWeese, as well as Maxine Blackmer, Freeman Butts, Walter Hook, and more.
