= Jessie Wilber =

American printmaker and educator

Jessie Spaulding Wilber
- Born: November 10, 1912; Whitewater, Wisconsin
- Died: October 2, 1989 (aged 76)
- Education: Colorado State Teachers' College Montana State University
- Known for: Printmaking

Jessie Spaulding Wilber (November 10, 1912 – October 2, 1989) was an American printmaker and educator.

== Life and career ==
Wilber was born in Whitewater, Wisconsin. Her family moved frequently in her childhood, living in Illinois, Ohio, Oklahoma, Michigan before they settled permanently in Boulder, Colorado when she was eight years old.

Magpies in the Snowstorm

Poppies

She attended college at Colorado State Teachers' College and studied art where she earned an A.B. and an M.A. Estelle Stinchfield was an influential teacher in her career. She became interested in cubism in 1933 and stated later that she would "remain loyal to cubism" for many years. In 1945, the artist Otis Dozier influenced her to look at other modern techniques. Her work style changed over time from cubism to impressionism, and she became best-known as a printmaker.

Wilber came to Montana State College in Bozeman, Montana after teaching for four years when she saw an opening for a art faculty position, and remained there from 1941 to 1972. During this time she also taught courses at the Archie Bray Foundation in Helena, Montana. She became the Art department head by the early 1950s. She was at her most productive as an artist late in her life and was known for her willingness to explore new artistic techniques. Along with Bob DeWeese and Frances Senska, Wilber is known as one of the three art professors who integrated the study and philosophy of modernism to Montana State University in the 1940s and 1950s. In 1942 Wilber completed a commission from the U.S. Treasury Department Section of Painting and Sculpture, a still-extant mural in the U.S. post office in Kingman, Kansas, titled In the Days of the Cattlemen's Picnic (1942). In 1944–45 she and Olga Ross Hannon created a portfolio of 16 color serigraph reproductions of painted tipis by members of the Blackfoot Confederacy. In 1975 their work was part of a touring exhibition by the Museum of the Rockies, with funding from the Montana Arts Council. A 1966 trip to Africa inspired her to create a series of 15 prints.

In the 1940s, Wilber collaborated with her students to create a series of murals that still hang in the entrance of Lewis Hall on the Montana State University-Bozeman campus. These murals depict the study of Rocky Mountain Spotted Fever and the subsequent discovery of a cure.

The Jessie Wilber Gallery at the Beall Park Art Center in Bozeman, is named in her honor and permanently displays some of her works. Several of her pieces are included in the permanent collection of the Yellowstone Art Museum in Billings, Montana.

Along with lifelong companion and fellow artist Frances Senska, Wilber was a recipient of the Governor's Award for the Arts in 1988. The Montana Arts Council issues a yearly award to a ceramics artist called the Jessie Wilber and Frances Senska Individual Artist Award, which was established by a private gift from Stacy Hamm and Sage Walden.

== Selected bibliography ==
- Senska, Frances, Frances Wilber, and Martin Holt. 1979. Frances Senska and Jessie Wilber interview.
- Ewers, John C., Jessie Wilber, and Olga Ross Hannon. 1976. Blackfeet Indian tipis: design and legend. Bozeman, Mont: Museum of the Rockies.
- Yellowstone Art Museum (Billings, Mont.), and Gordon McConnell. 2005. Making Connections: Modern and Contemporary Art on the High Plains, 1945–Present : Works from the Permanent Collection of the Yellowstone Art Museum. Billings: Yellowstone Art Museum.

== Selected works ==
- Sam and Friends, 1990, Silk screen cut-outs, Yellowstone Art Museum
- Magpies, 1993, Woodcut, Yellowstone Art Museum
- Poppies, 1993, print, Yellowstone Art Museum
