= Delta Phi Delta =

American art honor society (defunct)

- ΔΦΔ
- Founded: May 28, 1912; 114 years ago University of Kansas
- Type: Honor
- Former affiliation: ACHS
- Status: Defunct
- Emphasis: Art
- Scope: National
- Member badge
- Colors: Red and Bright blue
- Flower: Sweet pea
- Jewel: Pearl
- Publication: Palette
- Chapters: 50
- Members: 13,450+ lifetime
- Headquarters: United States

Delta Phi Delta National Art Honor Society (ΔΦΔ) was an American collegiate art honor society. Delta Phi Delta was a member of the Association of College Honor Societies. The national society is defunct, with one former chapter operating as a local organization.

== History ==
The society was originally organized as the Palette Club on January 10, 1909, in Old Snow Hall at the University of Kansas in Lawrence, Kansas. Its founders included fourteen girls and one male student who were students in the fine arts department. It began publishing its magazine, Palette, in 1911. By March 1912, the Palette Club had initiated twenty members and two faculty members.

On March 19, 1912, members of the Palette Club discussed becoming a national Greek letter society. This plan received support from the university's chancellor and regents. two colleges had also expressed an interest in joining such a group. The Palette Club was renamed Delta Phi Delta at a Des Moines, Iowa conference on May 28, 1912.

Its charter members were Emly Annadown, Wilma Arnett, Arta Briggs, Lo Alma Brown, Edith Cooper, Myrtle Ellsworth, Neva Foster, Mae Jordan, Lucile Krieder, Lida LeSuer, Irene Russell, Nettie Smith, and Addie Underwood. Neva Foster Gribble was the sorority's first national chair and wrote its ceremonies, constitution, and bylaws. Delta Phi Delta was the first honorary art society.

The purpose of Delta Phi Delta was to encourage scholarship, promote art in the United States, and recognize accomplishment in the arts. Chapters were located at four-year colleges that granted degrees in the arts. The Beta chapter was established at the University of Montana in 1918, followed by Gamma at the University of Minnesota in 1919, and Delta at Bethany College in 1920.

The sorority held its first national convention at the University of Kansas from June 3 to 5, 1920. The cost of the convention was supplemented by a member's art sale in December 1919. Mrs. W. H. Humble, president of the Alpha chapter alumnae association, was elected the sorority's first grand president. At its second national convention, the sorority agreed to admit men and women. The following year, around one-third of its members were males. Later, it was called the Delta Phi Delta National Art Honor Society.

Delta Phi Delta joined the American Federation of Arts and the Association of College Honor Societies. It had 41 chapters in attendance at its June 1956 convention. By 1964, it had initiated 13,450 members.

Delta Phi Delta went dormant in the late 20th century, with the chapters at Texas Women's University and Purdue University continuing to operate as local fraternities. In 2024, Texas Women's College disbanded what was still called Delta Phi Delta, forming the local group SpaceCraft. The only surviving chapter of Delta Phi Delta is at Purdue and calls itself the Delta Phi Delta Fine Arts Club.

== Symbols ==
The Delta Phi Delta badge was a gold artist's pallet with three paint brushes crossed to the rear with raised Greek letters ΔΦΔ across the front, encircled by crown-set pearls. It originated as the pin of the Palette Club. The society's key was similar to its badge. There was a different key for laureate members.

Delta Phi Delta's coat of arms included a shield of argent with a sable border. Above the shield is a crest consisting of an artist's palette with three brushes on top of a radiant star. Below the shield is a scroll with the motto Δέλτα Φτ Δέλτα in Greek.

Delta Phi Delta's colors were originally red and bright blue; in 1936 they were listed as gold and old rose. Its flower was the sweet pea. Its jewel was the pearl. Its publication was Palette, continuing the name from the Palette Club. "The Delta Phi Delta Song" was written by Frances Jones.

== Activities ==
Delta Phi Delta offered scholarships for its members. One of its awards was the Ruth Raymond Scholarship to the Little Artists Colony in Stillwater, Minnesota. In the 1920s, the it developed an annual National Traveling Exhibit of Delta Psi Delta. The first traveling exhibit was developed in the fall of 1920 and featured work from members of all five chapters. The society also held a juried art show for its student members at its national convention.

The chapters sponsored demonstrations and talks about architecture, arts, and related subjects. Chapters also provided space for art students to be creative outside of the classroom and encourage experimentation with new mediums or methods. In addition, chapters hosted annual art exhibits featuring the work of members. Another chapter activity was an annual costume ball, themed to eras in art history.

Chapters also sponsored fairs, auctions, and sales where their current members and alumni sold their art. A 1973 ad for the annual art sale at the Texas Women's University listed a wide range of art forms for sale, including drawings, macramé, paintings, photographs, pottery, prints, sculpture, silk screens, water colors, and weavings. In some cases, the art sales were open to any student, with a small commission fee raising funds that allowed the chapter to sponsor guest speakers and other programs.

== Membership ==
Delta Phi Delta's members were selected by faculty based on overall grade point average and artistic ability. Members were juniors and seniors studying fine arts, who placed in the upper 35 percent of their class. In addition, members were required to have a B average or 3.0 GPA. Initially, membership was open only to female students. However, it opened for male members after the 1922 national convention.

== Governance ==
Delta Phi Delta was overseen by a grand council elected at its annual national convention. Its officers included a grand president, grand secretary, grand treasurer, and grand corresponding secretary.

== Chapters ==
Following is a list of known Delta Phi Delta chapters. Active chapters are indicated in bold. Inactive chapters are in italics.

Chapter	Charter date and range	Institution	Location	Status	Ref.
Alpha	May 28, 1912	University of Kansas	Lawrence, Kansas	Inactive	(Note: The chapter was originally formed as the local group Palette Club on January 10, 1909. When it became the Alpha chapter, it was also called the Griffith chapter in honor of William A. Griffith, a professor of the fine arts school.)
Beta	1918–October 1928	University of Montana	Missoula, Montana	Inactive	(Note: The chapter's charter was withdrawn due to a lack of art majors.)
Gamma	December 1919–after 1973	University of Minnesota	Minneapolis, Minnesota	Inactive	
Delta	March 4, 1920 – 192x ?; February 4, 1927	Bethany College	Lindsborg, Kansas	Inactive	(Note: The chapter was also known as the Sandzen chapter. It went inactive shortly after being established, sometime before the publication of the 1923 edition of Baird's. It was reinstated in 1927.)
Epsilon	May 28, 1920	Washburn University	Topeka, Kansas	Inactive	
Zeta	1921	Art Institute of Chicago	Chicago, Illinois	Inactive	
Eta	May 21, 1921 – 19xx ?	University of Wisconsin–Madison	Madison, Wisconsin	Inactive	(Note: Chapter was formed from the local group, Arts and Crafts Club, established to become a chapter of Delta Phi Delta.) (Note: Chapter was inactive before 1962.)
Theta	May 1922	Ohio Wesleyan University	Delaware, Ohio	Inactive	
Iota	1922	Ohio University	Athens, Ohio	Inactive	
Kappa	December 2, 1922 – 1960	University of North Dakota	Grand Forks, North Dakota	Inactive	(Note: Chapter formed from the preexisting Sketchers' Club (local).)
Lambda	December 5, 1922	Drake University	Des Moines, Iowa	Inactive	(Note: Chapter formed from the Drake Art Club, established in 1919.)
Mu	November 1924	University of Missouri	Columbia, Missouri	Inactive	
Nu	May 27, 1926 – 19xx ?	James Millikin University	Decatur, Illinois	Inactive	(Note: The chapter formed from the Milikin Art Guild, a local student organization.)
Xi	April 16, 1927	Santa Barbara State Teacher's College	Santa Barbara, California	Inactive	(Note: The chapter formed from Phi Chi Alpha, a local fraternity established in 1925.)
Omicron	1928	Iowa State University	Ames, Iowa	Inactive	
Pi	1929–19xx ?	University of California, Berkeley	Berkeley, California	Inactive	(Note: Chapter was dormant before the formation of the USC chapter in 1931.)
Rho	1930	University of Colorado Boulder	Boulder, Colorado	Inactive	
Sigma	1930	Washington State University	Pullman, Washington	Inactive	
Tau	1930	Miami University	Oxford, Ohio	Inactive	
Upsilon	February 23, 1931 – 19xx ?	University of Southern California	Los Angeles, California	Inactive	(Note: Chapter formed from Tau Sigma, a local honor fraternity)
Phi	1932–after 1973	Montana State University	Bozeman, Montana	Inactive	
Chi	1932	Edinboro State College	Edinboro, Pennsylvania	Inactive	
Psi	1936	University of Nebraska–Lincoln	Lincoln, Nebraska	Inactive	
Omega	May 20, 1936	University of Oklahoma	Norman, Oklahoma	Inactive	
Alpha Alpha	May 23, 1936 – 19xx ?	University of New Mexico	Albuquerque, New Mexico	Inactive	(Note: Chapter formed from Do Chown, a local organization of junior and senior art students.)
Alpha Beta	November 1938	California College of the Arts and Crafts	Oakland, California	Inactive	(Note: The chapter formed as the Delta Phi Art Honor Society, a local group established in 1936.)
Alpha Gamma	July 30, 1938	University of Northern Colorado	Greeley, Colorado	Inactive	
Alpha Delta	1939	Ohio State University	Columbus, Ohio	Inactive	
Alpha Epsilon	March 18, 1940 – c. 2024	Texas Woman's University	Denton, Texas	Inactive	(Note: This chapter continued to exist as a local organization after the national society became defunct. The local chapter, called Delta Phi Delta, disbanded and reformed as SpaceCraft in 2024, according to its faculty advisor.)
Alpha Zeta	May 25, 1941	University of Cincinnati	Cincinnati, Ohio	Inactive	(Note: Chapter formed from Sigma Kappa Tau, a local honorary society for applied arts.)
Alpha Eta	February 1944	Ball State University	Muncie, Indiana	Inactive	
Alpha Theta	May 16, 1945 – after 1973	Southwest Missouri State University	Springfield, Missouri	Inactive	
Alpha Iota				Unassigned ?	
Alpha Kappa	1946	San Jose State University	San Jose, California	Inactive	
Alpha Lambda	March 30, 1946	Indiana University of Pennsylvania	Indiana, Pennsylvania	Inactive	(Note: Chapter formed from Delta Phi, a local honor fraternity established in November 1944.)
Alpha Mu	January 1948	Michigan State University	East Lansing, Michigan	Inactive	
Alpha Nu	June 21, 1948	Illinois Wesleyan University	Bloomington, Illinois	Inactive	
Alpha Xi	November 20, 1948 – after 1974	Bowling Green State University	Bowling Green, Ohio	Inactive	(Note: Chapter formed from the BGSU University Art Club.)
Alpha Omicron	June 1949	University of Puget Sound	Tacoma, Washington	Inactive	(Note: The chapter formed from Alpha Rho Tau, a local art fraternity.)
Alpha Pi	July 1951	Bradley University	Peoria, Illinois	Inactive	
Alpha Rho	1952–after 1972	Kansas State University	Manhattan, Kansas	Inactive	
Alpha Sigma	1956	Mount Mary College	Milwaukee, Wisconsin	Inactive	
Alpha Tau	1959	College of Saint Mary	Omaha, Nebraska	Inactive	
**Alpha Upsilon**	May 1960	Purdue University	West Lafayette, Indiana	Active (local)	(Note: This chapter continues to operate as the independent Delta Phi Delta Fine Arts Club.)
Alpha Phi	May 14, 1960 – after April 1976	East Carolina University	Greenville, North Carolina	Inactive	
Alpha Chi	1964–after May 1982	College of St. Catherine	Saint Paul, Minnesota	Inactive	
Alpha Psi	1964	Northern State University	Aberdeen, South Dakota	Inactive	
Alpha Omega ?	May 21, 1964	University of Wisconsin–Stevens Point	Stevens Point, Wisconsin	Inactive	(Note: Chapter formed from the Student Art League, a local organization established in 1963.)
Beta Alpha	May 25, 1964 – after 1978	South Dakota State University	Brookings, South Dakota	Inactive	
Delta Gamma		Northern Illinois University	DeKalb, Illinois	Inactive	

== Notable members ==
- Anna P. Baker (Zeta), visual artist
- Olga Ross Hannon (Beta), artist, head of applied art at Montana State College, and president of Delta Phi Delta
- Clyde Kenneth Harris (Omega), interior decorator who served as a "Monuments Men" during World War II
- Rosekrans Hoffman (Psi), children's book illustrator and painter
- Harold G. Nelson (Beta, 1969), architect
- Doris Baldwin Mohs (Eta), architect and chapter founder
- Rodney Thoburn Robinson (Upsilon), architect
- Roland Gommel Roessner (Alpha Zeta), architect and chairman of the department of design at the University of Texas at Austin
- Coreen Mary Spellman (Alpha Epsilon) printmaker, painter, and teacher
- Rene Stuedemann (Omicron), Miss Iowa and National Baton Twirling Association junior and senior national twirling champion
- Charles Turzak (Zeta), artist, known primarily for his modernist woodblock prints
- Muriel Sibell Wolle (Alpha Epsilon), artist

=== Laureate members ===
Delta Phi Delta honored the following well-known artists with laureate memberships.

- Wayman Adams
- Buckminster Fuller
- Bruce Goff
- William Alexander Griffith
- Ernest Bruce Haswell
- Oscar B. Jacobson
- Raymond Johnson
- Jon Mangus Jonson
- Dwight Kirsch
- Abraham Rattner
- Ruth Raymond
- Boardman Robinson
- John Rood
- Birger Sandzen (Delta)
- Eugene Francis Savage
- Lorado Taft
- Levon West
- Francis Whittemore
- Muriel Sibell Wolle
- Grant Wood

== See also ==
- Honor cords
