= Jimmy McKinnell =

Jimmy McKinnell may refer to:

- Jimmy McKinnell (footballer) (1893–1972), Scottish footballer
- Jimmy McKinnell Sr. (died 1965), manager of Scottish football club Queen of the South
- Jimmy McKinnell Jr. (died 1995), secretary and manager of Queen of the South
