= National Council on Education for the Ceramic Arts =

- National Council on Education for the Ceramic Arts
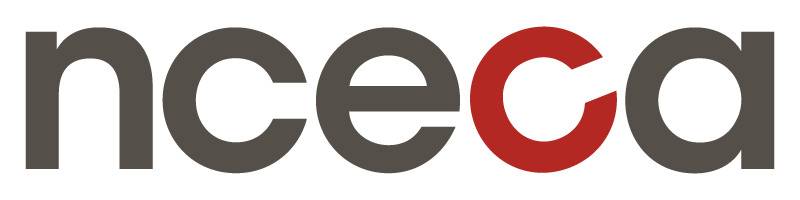
- Abbreviation: NCECA
- Established: 1966
- Website: Official website

Founded in 1966, the National Council on Education for the Ceramic Arts (NCECA) is an organization in the United States serving the interests of ceramics as an art form and in creative education. Most major American ceramic artists since the 1970s, such as Frances Senska, Paul Soldner, Peter Voulkos, and Rudy Autio have been among its members.

During the 1961 meeting of the American Ceramic Society held at the Royal York Hotel in Toronto, Theodore (Ted) Randall gathered a group in attendance together to coalesce around the developing interest of ceramics as an art form. ACS had a Design Section and a Ceramic Education Council and Randall thought that artists teaching the medium as an expressive practice at the college level might have a place there. Randall crafted and presented the NCECA identity for the first time in 1961.

Tensions between the interests of art and industry soon became apparent, and NCECA withdrew its membership from ACS in 1966. Initiated that same year, NCECA's annual conference now registers from 3200-5000 attendees each year. NCECA's membership has evolved from almost entirely a group of teachers and professors to a more varied make up including practicing studio potters and artists, students, businesses, organizations, galleries and collectors. Notable 20th-century American ceramic artists including Donald Frith, Robert Turner, Warren MacKenzie, Don Reitz and Val Cushing have served as NCECA's presidents. Marge Levy served as NCECA's first woman president from 1983-84. In 2004, Robert Harrison became the first full-time studio artist selected as president.

At the 2018 conference in Pittsburgh, there were over 6500 attendees.

== Locations of NCECA conferences ==
- President in parentheses
- 1966 Washington DC, during separation from ACers
- 1967 Michigan State, East Lansing (William Parry)
- 1968 Rhode Island School of Design, Providence (Norm Schulman)
- 1969 Kansas City Art Institute, Kansas City (Robert Turner)
- 1970 California School of Arts & Crafts, Oakland (Jim Wozniak)
- 1971 Royal College of Art, Toronto, (Richard Peeler)
- 1972 Arrowmont School of Crafts, Gatlinburg (Miska Petersham)
- 1973 Northern Arizona University, Flagstaff (Don Reitz)
- 1974 University of Wisconsin, Madison (Don Reitz)
- 1975 Tyler School of Art, Philadelphia (Don Frith)
- 1976 Louisiana State, Baton Rouge (Don Frith)
- 1977 University of Northern Colorado, Greeley (Warren MacKenzie)
- 1978 University of Illinois, Champaign (Warren MacKenzie)
- 1979 Pennsylvania State University (Dick Hay)
- 1980 Pennsylvania State University (Dick Hay)
- 1981 Wichita State University (William Alexander)
- 1982 San Jose State University, San Jose (Val Cushing)
- 1983 Georgia State University, Atlanta (Marj Levy)
- 1984 Massachusetts College of Art, Boston (Marj Levy)
- 1985 Washington University School of Fine Arts, St. Louis (Lenny Dowhie)
- 1986 University of Texas & Southwest Craft Center, San Antonio (Lenny Dowhie)
- 1987 Everson Museum of Art, Syracuse (Jerry Horning)
- 1988 Oregon Art Institute, Portland (Jerry Horning)
- 1989 Kansas City Art Institute, Kansas City (Mary Jane Edwards)
- 1990 Arts & Education Community in Ohio & Kentucky, Cincinnati (Mary Jane Edwards)
- 1991 Arizona State University, Tempe (Jay Lacouture)
- 1992 Temple University, Philadelphia (Jay Lacouture)
- 1993 Grossmont College & Mesa College, San Diego (Joe Bova)
- 1994 Tulane University, New Orleans (Joe Bova)
- 1995 University of Minnesota, Minneapolis (Anna Calluori Holcombe)
- 1996 School for American Crafts/Rochester Institute of Technology, Rochester (Anna Calluori Holcombe)
- 1997 University of Nevada, Las Vegas (James Tanner)
- 1998 University of Dallas-Irving, Fort Worth (James Tanner)
- 1999 Ohio State University & American Ceramic Society, Columbus (Curtis Hoard)
- 2000 Metropolitan State College of Denver, Denver (Curtis Hoard)
- 2001 Winthrop University, Rock Hill SC/Charlotte NC (Steve Reynolds)
- 2002 Kansas City Art Institute (Steve Reynolds)
- 2003 San Diego State University, San Diego (Elaine Henry)
- 2004 University of Indianapolis & the Herron School of Art (Elaine Henry)
- 2005 Baltimore Clay Works, Baltimore (Susan Filley)
- 2006 Lewis & Clark College and Oregon College of Art & Craft, Portland (Susan Filley)
- 2007 Indiana University Southeast and University of Louisville, Louisville (Robert Harrison)
- 2008 Manchester Craftsmen's Guild, Pittsburg (Robert Harrison)
- 2009 Arizona State University, Phoenix (Skeff Thomas)
- 2010 The Clay Studio, Philadelphia (Skeff Thomas)
- 2011 University of Florida and Eckerd College, Tampa- St. Pete's (Keith Williams)
- 2012 Pottery Northwest and the University of Washington, Seattle (Keith Williams)
- 2013 George R. Brown Convention Center, Houston TX (Patsy Cox)
- 2014 Wisconsin Center, Milwaukee, WI (Patsy Cox)
- 2015 Providence RI (Deb Bedwell)
- 2016 Kansas City (Deb Bedwell)
- 2017 Portland (Chris Staley)
- 2018 Pittsburgh (Chris Staley)
- 2019 Minneapolis (Holly Hanessian)
- 2020 Covid Canceled (Holly Hasessian)
- 2021 Virtual (Pete Pinnell)
- 2022 Sacramento (Pete Pinnell)
- 2023 Cincinnati (Rhonda Willers)
- 2024 Richmond, Virginia (Rhonda Willers)
- 2025 Salt Lake City, Utah (Shoji Satake)
- 2026 Detroit, MI (Shoji Satake)
