= List of Intercollegiate Knights chapters =

Intercollegiate Knights is an American collegiate men's honorary service group founded in 1922. In the following list of Intercollegiate Knights chapters, active chapters are indicated in bold and inactive chapters and institutions are in italics.

Chapter	Charter date	Institution	Location	Status	Ref.
Hook	1922–before 2007	University of Washington	Seattle, Washington	Inactive	(Note: Chapter formed from the Knights of the Hook (local). This chapter was previously called the Sun Dodgers.)
Ball and Chain	1922–c. 1983	University of Idaho	Moscow, Idaho	Inactive	(Note: Chapter formed from Ball and Chain, a pre-existing student organization.)
Fang	1922–c. 1981	Montana State University	Bozeman, Montana	Inactive	(Note: Chapter formed from the Fang Club, established in 1919.)
Cougar Guard	1922–c. 1985	Washington State University	Pullman, Washington	Inactive	(Note: Chapter formed from the Cougar Guard, a local service organization established in 1919.)
Bear Paw	1922–c. 1961	University of Montana	Missoula, Montana	Inactive	
Oregon Knights	1922–before 2007	University of Oregon	Eugene, Oregon	Inactive	(Note: This chapter was once called Skull and Dagger.)
Beaver Knights / Thane	1923–before 2007	Oregon State University	Corvallis, Oregon	Inactive	
Beno	1924–before 2007	Utah State University	Logan, Utah	Inactive	(Note: The chapter formed from the BeNo Club, established in 1922.)
Yeoman	1925–before 2007	University of Redlands	Redlands, California	Inactive	
Trojan Knights	1925–before 2007	University of Southern California	Los Angeles, California	Inactive	
Pioneer Lancer	1932–before 2007	Lewis–Clark State College	Lewiston, Idaho	Inactive	
Tiger	1932–before 2007	Idaho State University	Pocatello, Idaho	Inactive	(Note: Chapter formed from the Tiger Club, a local service organization.)
Arrowrock	1935–after 2007	College of Idaho	Caldwell, Idaho	Inactive	
Tomahawk	1935–before 2007	Eastern Washington University	Cheney, Washington	Inactive	(Note: Chapter formed from Tomahawk, a local service club.)
Kennel	1936–before 2007	Gonzaga University	Spokane, Washington	Inactive	(Note: Chapter formed from the Kennel Club (local).)
Claw	1937–before 2007	Central Washington University	Ellensburg, Washington	Inactive	(Note: Chapter formed from the local group Knights of the Claw, established in 1924.)
Copper Guard	1937–before 2007	Montana School of Mines	Butte, Montana	Inactive	(Note: Formed from Copper Guard, a local group established in 1935.)
Scalper / Red Templar	1937–before 2007	University of Utah	Salt Lake City, Utah	Inactive	(Note: Chapter formed from Scalper, a local service organization.)
Old Oak	1939–before 2007	Linfield University	McMinnville, Oregon	Inactive	
Cardinal	1940–1951 ?	Albion State Normal School	Albion, Idaho	Inactive	(Note: School closed in 1951.)
Golden Plume	1940–1995	Boise State University	Boise, Idaho	Inactive	(Note: Chapter formed from the Golden Plume, a local organization.)
Wigwam	1940–before 2007	Seattle University	Seattle, Washington	Inactive	(Note: Chapter formed from Wigwam, a local group formed with the intent to became a chapter of the Intercollegiate Knights.)
Gold Y	1941–before 2007	Brigham Young University	Provo, Utah	Inactive	(Note: Chapter formed from Gold Y, a local service organization.)
Log	1946–before 2007	University of Puget Sound	Tacoma, Washington	Inactive	
Badger	1947–before 2007	Pacific University	Forest Grove, Oregon	Inactive	(Note: Chapter formed from Badger, a local service organization.)
Lookout	1948–before 2007	Whitworth University	Spokane, Washington	Inactive	(Note: Chapter formed from Lookout, a local service organization.)
Norseman Knights / Silver Chalice / Viking	1948–before 2007	Brigham Young University–Idaho	Rexburg, Idaho	Inactive	(Note: Chapter formed at Ricks College, now Brigham Young University–Idaho, from the Norsemen Knights of Ricks College, a local service organization.)
Pilots	1948–before 2007	University of Portland	Portland, Oregon	Inactive	
Mustang	1949–before 2007	Lewis & Clark College	Portland, Oregon	Inactive	
Rainbow	1949–before 2007	Southern Utah University	Cedar City, Utah	Inactive	(Note: Chapter formed at Branch Agricultural College, now Southern Utah University.)
Rimrock Knights	1949–before 2007	Rocky Mountain College	Billings, Montana	Inactive	
Yurok	1949–before 2007	Humboldt State University	Arcata, California	Inactive	(Note: Chapter formed from a local service club called the Humbolt Knights.)
Stinger / Avalon	1950–before 2007	Montana State University Billings	Billings, Montana	Inactive	
Gold Nugget (see Thor)	1951–October 1962	University of Denver	Denver, Colorado	Consolidated	(Note: Chapter was also called Civic Center.)
Los Caballeros	1951–before 2007	Westminster College	Salt Lake City, Utah	Inactive	
Mountaineer	1951–before 2007	Eastern Oregon University	La Grande, Oregon	Inactive	
Pioneer (see Thor)	1951–October 1962	University of Denver - Park Campus	Colorado	Consolidated	
Cruiser	1953–before 2007	Olympic College	Bremerton, Washington	Inactive	
Harbor Knights	1953–before 2007	Grays Harbor College	Aberdeen, Washington	Inactive	
Los Matadores	1953–before 2007	New Mexico Highlands University	Las Vegas, New Mexico	Inactive	
Totem	1953–before 2007	Colorado State University	Fort Collins, Colorado	Inactive	
Yeoman	1953–before 2007	Saint Martin's University	Lacey, Washington	Inactive	
Excalibur	1954–before 2007	Eastern Oklahoma State College	Wilburton, Oklahoma	Inactive	
Camelot	1959–before 2007	University of Texas–Pan American	Edinburg, Texas	Inactive	
Golden Eagle	1959–before 2007	Utah State University Eastern	Price, Utah	Inactive	
Snow / White Knights	1959–before 2007	Snow College	Ephraim, Utah	Inactive	
Odin's Raiders	1960–before 2007	Portland State University	Portland, Oregon	Inactive	
Praetor	1960–before 2007	Northeastern Oklahoma A&M College	Miami, Oklahoma	Inactive	
Red Eagle	1960–before 2007	University of Nevada, Las Vegas	Paradise, Nevada	Inactive	(Note: Chapter formed at Nevada, Southern Division, now called the University of Nevada Las Vegas.)
Wolf Knights	1960–before 2007	Western Oregon University	Monmouth, Oregon	Inactive	
Lancelot	1961–before 2007	Connors State College	Muskogee, Oklahoma	Inactive	
Galahad	1961–before 2007	Oklahoma State University	Stillwater, Oklahoma	Inactive	
Buenaventura	1961–before 2007	Ventura College	Ventura, California	Inactive	
Scout	1961–before 2007	University of San Diego	San Diego, California	Inactive	
Royal Windsor	1962–before 2007	Fort Lewis College	Durango, Colorado	Inactive	
Kamehameha	1962–before 2007	Brigham Young University–Hawaii	Lāʻie, Hawaii	Inactive	(Note: Chapter formed at the Church College of Hawaii which became Brigham Young University–Hawaii in 1974.)
Thor	October 1962–before 2007	University of Denver	Denver, Colorado	Inactive	(Note: Chapter formed from the consolidation of Gold Nugget and Pioneer chapters,)
Harbinger	1963–before 2007	Washburn University	Topeka, Kansas	Inactive	
**Osage**	1963–before 2007	Missouri University of Science and Technology	Rolla, Missouri	Active	
Knight	1964–before 2007	Pacific Lutheran University	Parkland, Washington	Inactive	
Golden Fleece	1964–before 2007	Yakima Valley College	Yakima, Washington	Inactive	
Crimson Tide	1968–before 2007	Western Montana College	Dillon, Montana	Inactive	
Javelina	1968–before 2007	Texas A&M University–Kingsville	Kingsville, Texas	Inactive	
Falcon	1969–before 200	Columbia Basin College	Pasco, Washington	Inactive	
Don Quixote	1976–before 2007	University of Texas at Austin	Austin, Texas	Inactive	
Tri-Star	1988–before 2007	University of Missouri	Columbia, Missouri	Inactive	
Silver Plume	1990–before 2007	Utah Valley State College	Orem, Utah	Inactive	
