= Senska =

Senska is a surname. Notable people with the surname include:

- Frances Senska (1914–2009), American ceramicist
- Pierre Senska (born 1988), German cyclist
