= Anna P. Baker =

Canadian visual artist (1928–1985)

- Born: Anna Patricia Ethel Valentine Baker; 12 June 1928; London, Ontario, Canada
- Died: 28 February 1985 (aged 56); Kingston, Ontario, Canada
- Education: University of Western Ontario; Delta Phi Delta
- Occupation: Visual artist

Anna Patricia Ethel Valentine Baker (12 June 1928 – 28 February 1985) known as Anna P. Baker was a Canadian visual artist.

== Career ==
Born in London, Ontario, Canada, she was adopted by Alfred Burrows Baker and Mabel Roberta Pearl Baker. She entered the University of Western Ontario where she was elected to the Art Students League, A.I.C., and Delta Phi Delta, and graduated in 1950. She received a BFA and a MFA from the Art Institute of Chicago in 1954, and went on to teach art at Hathaway Brown School in Shaker Heights, Ohio, for three years.

She exhibited frequently in her home town of London, Ontario, and for many years at the 57th Street Art Fair in Chicago, and in many cities from Los Angeles to New York. In 1956 she won the top painting award in the Chicago Art Institute's 59th Chicago and Vicinity art annual for High Frequency Ping.

Baker remained a Canadian citizen but for the last 29 years of her life, she lived in the village of Barton, Vermont, where she opted to bow out of the world of dealers and galleries so she could work in her own way on her own terms. On 28 February 1985, Anna died in Kingston, Ontario, from cancer.

== Work ==
Baker integrated her eclectic interests into the subject matter of her paintings. Her memories of her home town, London, Ontario and of her childhood are transcribed into an earlier time frame in such works as: London Airport - 1910, Elmwood Bowling Green, The Victoria Jane, Tennis - 1910, Baseball Game, Orangeman's Parade, With Mutes and Plumes and The Garden Party.

Interested in theatre, she created The Ambrose Small Series. Ambrose Small was the proprietor of the Grand Theatre (now Theatre London) who disappeared 2 December 1919 after selling his theatrical holdings, leaving his wife, $2 million and a legal tangle. His legend has inspired many words and the continuing rumour that his ghost haunts Theatre London. Baker envisioned productions as they might have been in the time of Small. Twenty-four paintings were exhibited at the Nancy Poole Studio including Ambrose Small Production of Rose Marie, Ambrose Small; Production of the Dumbbells, An Ambrose Small Production of "Polly of the Circus" in which he is depicted floating over the top of the production, Ambrose Small Production of Uncle Tom's Cabin and Ladies of the Chorus.

On the subject of art, she created The Rosa Bonheur Series, 18 paintings in which she visualized the French realist painter and sculptor on imaginary world travels. The Ascension of Rosa Bonheur Over Niagara Falls, Rosa Bonheur in Venice, and Rosa Bonheur is Late for the Ambassador's Ball are a few from this series. These were exhibited at the Howell Gallery in London, Canada. Baker felt very much akin to Rosa whose whole life was art. She often signed her letters, "Rosa Bonheur of the Northeast Kingdom", the Northeast Kingdom being northeast Vermont. This was put on her tombstone in Scottsville, Ontario.

On history: Before Salisbury, Laura Secord and Her Cow, The Trojan Horse (created while still at the Art Institute of Chicago), Queen Victoria Reviewing the Troops with the Duke of Wellington After Landseer, Two Phoenicians.

On literature, she created Don Quixote, The Cranford Series, Shakespearean Series, Reluctance (Robert Frost)

The Shakespearean series was inspired by a visit to the Stratford Festival Theatre in Stratford, Ontario, in the mid-1960s. Festival, Richard III, Henry V, Malvolio and Taming of the Shrew are the titles of some of the paintings from this series. Help was received from a Canada Council grant, 1968.

There are two series of paintings and drawings from the book, Cranford by Elizabeth Gaskell. In the last series of 13 paintings, the titles included The Cat that Swallowed the Lace, He Knew Cream Quite Well and Constantly Refused Tea With Only Milk in It, and If the Supposed Robbers Would Come to Him He would Fight Them, Our Idea of the Dignity of Silence was Paling Before our Curiosity, She Did Not Seem to Notice the Extraordinary Size and Complexity of Her Headdress.

In terms of biology, she painted numerous owl paintings, The Cornish Cat, Three Grouse, The Great Lobster Catch, Bird, Owl and a Very Fat Dog, Baboon, Butterflies and Moths. Baker painted or sketched owls throughout her career; the Holstein cow or cows were her signature cartoons for The Chronicle newspaper. She also did a series on circus parades which included such works as: Circus Wagon with Lion, Circus Wagon with Bears, Circus Wagon with Mermaid, Circus Parade with Walrus, Circus Wagon with Alligator, Marching Circus Band and Circus Wagons with Monkeys and Giraffes.

Baker received awards including the Frank G Logan prize at the Chicago and Vicinity Exhibition in 1956 for High Frequency Ping and from the New England Press, Best Illustration, Daily, Class 1, First Place, Times Argus.

== Comments from critics ==
"Anna Baker works magnificently in many media. Her pictures reveal the true mark of genius – an originality and technical excellence that offer her viewers a glimpse into a personal world of her own devising." Laurence Lariar, New York art dealer, 1967.

Anna's "Unique sense of humour and incredible capacity for painstaking detail makes her work inimitable. Like all good art, Ms. Baker's compositions are basically abstract, but the images that she develops often are quizzical, evoked in dots, dashes, and color shapes that leave no area without interest." "To own an Anna Baker drawing/painting is to be on daily contact with a blithe spirit who is also one of our most accomplished artists". Harold Hayden, art critic for the Chicago Sun-Times, 1979.

"Fanciful geometric wisps, suggesting the architecture of flowers and snow stars form the cellular structure of man and beast as created by artist Anna Baker. Thus the detailing of these fine examples of decorative art is as complex as watchworks, as equisite as doilies. The method, rendered with ink, as well as watercolors and oil paints, becomes a tour de force, and the compositions are as stylized as stage sets for an allegory." Beverly E. Johnson, Los Angeles Times Home Magazine, 4 February 1968.

When The Chronicle in 1974 began publishing in Barton, Vermont, Anna "began illustrating its humour column. Her first illustration showed the artist seated on a Holstein cow. ... She began to submit cartoons featuring two wall-eyed Holsteins who regularly observe the triumphs and follies of the Northeast Kingdom" (NE Vermont). Tom Slayton, Times Argus, 4 September 1983.

"Anna P. Baker, former Chicagoan creates a marvelous storybook world of her own in her infinitely detailed, intricate paintings and drawings. Her work can be seen here only at the Little Gallery, 1328 E. 57th St. which is directed by Mary Louise Womer and Mrs. Carl Schniewind, widow of the late director of the Art institute's prints and drawings department. Visitors flock to see a Baker show ... Miss Baker's collection is called 'Chiefly Cornish' having been done during a year's visit to Cornwall, England. The 35 pictures are filled with the high quality and the charm of her work. Her pen often reveals her lively wit as well as her originality and her imagination". Edith Weigle, art critic for the Chicago Tribune, 19 November 1961.

== Exhibitions ==
- 1952 Exhibited in Chicago and Vicinity, 56th Annual and numerous group shows in the Chicago area
- 1953 Philadelphia Print Club Lithography Exhibition
  - 25th International Northwest Printmakers, Portland, Oregon
  - Western Ontario Annual, London, Ontario
  - One Man Show, June Holmes Gallery, Chicago
  - 57th Annual Chicago and Vicinity Show
  - 5th Albany (N.Y.) Open National Print Exhibition
  - 4th Annual Print Exhibition, Bradley (Ill.) University
- 1954 Boston Society of Independent Artists
  - Philadelphia Print Club Lithography show
  - 3rd Annual Portland (Me.) Society of Art, Print Exhibition
  - 3rd Biennial Colour Lithography Exhibition, Cincinnati (Ohio) Art Museum
  - Library of Congress National Print Exhibition, Washington, D.C.
  - Canadian Society of Painters, Etchers and Engravers, Toronto, and Touring Exhibition
  - Western Ontario Annual, London, Ontario
  - Included in Loan Collection Art Institute of Chicago, Women's Board
  - American Federation of Arts Touring Print Exhibition
  - 7th Annual Boston Printmakers
  - Birmingham, Alabama, Watercolour Exhibition
  - 4th Print Annual, Contemporaries Art Gallery, New York
  - Graduated School of the Art Institute of Chicago with Faculty Honourable Mention; B.F.A. and M.F.A.
- 1955 One Man Show, Lantern Gallery, Chicago
  - 24th Print Exhibition, Wichita (Kans.) Art Association
  - 27th Philadelphia Lithography Annual
  - One Man Show, Jackson, Mississippi
  - One Man Show, Mandel Brothers, Chicago
  - Library of Congress American Print Exhibition; Purchase Award for Pennell Collection
  - 6th Biennial Open National Print Exhibit, Albany, New York
  - Silvermine Guild of Artists, Norwalk, Connecticut
- 1956 Canadian Society of Painters, Etchers and Engravers
  - Northwest Printmakers, Portland, Oregon
  - Cleveland Museum May Show; First Prize Lithography
  - Western Ontario Annual
  - Cincinnati Museum of Art National Print Exhibition
  - Butler Museum, Youngstown, Ohio, Midyear American Annual
  - 59th Annual Chicago and Vicinity Exhibit; awarded Mr. and Mrs. Frank G. Logan Prize for painting
  - One Man Show, Lantern Gallery, Chicago
  - Participated in a number of group shows in Chicago area
- 1957 Included in 56 Artists of Chicago Touring Exhibit in France and Germany sponsored by U.S.I.A.
  - Young Canadian Contemporaries
  - 60th Annual Chicago and Vicinity Exhibit, Art Institute of Chicago
  - One Man Show, Winnetka (Ill.) Women's Club
  - X I V American Drawing Show, Norfolk, Virginia
  - Two Man Show with Tony Urquart in London, Ontario
  - One Man Show, Art Colony Gallery, Cleveland, Ohio
  - Executed Commission for Marshall Field Store, Chicago
  - Cleveland Museum May Show; First Prize Drawing, Honourable Mention Painting and Watercolour
  - Cleveland Jaycee Exhibit; First Prize Drawing; Honorable Mention Painting
  - One Man Show, Nexus Gallery, Boston
  - Included in Dayton, Ohio Museum Loan Collection
  - Albany, New York, Print Exhibit
- 1958 Art U.S.A., New York
  - Young Contemporaries of Canada Touring Exhibit
  - Elected member C.P.E.
  - Freelance design work for Chicago Printed String Co
  - Cincinnati Lithography Biennial Exhibit
  - Washington Society of Printmakers, Seattle, Washington
  - Cleveland Museum May Show; Purchase Prize Drawing; Second Prize Painting
  - 12th Annual American Watercolour and Drawing Exhibit; Purchase Prize Drawing; Honourable Mention Drawing
  - Huntington (N.J.) Print Exhibit
  - Ball State College Drawing and Small Sculpture Exhibit; Two Purchase Awards63rd Annual Washington Watercolour Society Exhibition
- 1960 C.P.E. 44th Annual
  - Lyman Alleyn Museum, New London, Connecticut; Purchase Award
  - 50th Annual Connecticut Academy Show
  - 3rd Annual Brockton Art Association, Brockton, Massachusetts
  - 1960 Audubon Artists Annual, New York
  - 6th Annual Ball State Drawing and Small Sculpture; Purchase Award
  - One Man Show, Little Gallery, 57th St., Chicago
  - Boston Festival of Art
  - Worked in Birgit Skiold's Print Workshop, London, England
- 1961 Northeast Vermont Artists' Exhibition
  - Portland, (Me.) Festival of the Arts
  - One Man Show, Small World Gallery, Baldwin, New York
  - One Man Show, Little Gallery, Chicago
  - 1st Biennial American Drawing Exhibit, St. Paul, Minnesota
  - Washington Society of Printmakers, Seattle Washington
- 1962 8th Annual Ball State Small Drawing and Small Sculpture; Gallery Award
  - 65th Annual National Exhibit, Washington, D.C.; Watercolour Society Drawing Award
- 1963 66th Annual National Exhibition, Washington, D.C.; watercolour Society Drawing Award
  - Oklahoma Printmakers Exhibit
  - Purchase Award from University of Western Ontario
  - One Man Show, Osborne Gallery, New York
  - De Cordova Museum, Lincoln, Massachusetts, New England Artists' Exhibition
- 1964 One Man Show, Goddard College, Plainfield, Vermont
  - One Man Show, Little Gallery, Chicago
  - One Man Show, Small World Gallery, Baldwin, New York
- 1965 One Man Show, Jensen Gallery, London, Ontario
- 1966 One Man Show, Ray Williams Gallery, Chicago
- 1967 Included Loan Collection London Public Library and Art Museum
  - One Man Show, Lucille Fickett Gallery, Los Angeles, California
- 1968 One Man Show, University of Western Ontario, Alumni Hall
  - Grant from Canada Council
  - Brochure for Arts Faculty, University of Western Ontario, London, Ontario
- 1970 From 1952 to 1970 participated in the Annual 57th Street Art Fair, Chicago
- 1971 Included in Industrial Loan Collection of Women's Board, London Public Library and Art Museum
  - One Man Show, George Walter Vincent Smith Museum, Springfield Massachusetts

The above biography was written by Anna Baker. The following information was assembled from material from her estate.

- 1971 Alumni Gazette Cover, February 1971, University of Western Ontario
- 1973 One Man Show, Nancy Poole Studios, London, Canada
  - Ambrose Small Productions:
  - Exhibition of 26 paintings and Drawings
  - Catalogue
- 1974 to 1985 Illustrations for The Chronicle, newspaper Barton, Vermont
- 1975 Received heavy radiation treatment for cancer of the throat
  - One Man Show, A London Collection of paintings and Drawings (25th reunion of Arts'50, University of Western Ontario) – D.B.Weldon Library
  - Designed materials - sold one to Schumacker, N. Y.
- 1977 Vermont Bi-Centennial Poster Mediallion
- 1978 Print: The Quiet and Peaceful Village is Threatened by Runaway Pond 60 signed prints were sold. Meriden Press
  - Illustrations for The Book of Chowder by Richard J. Hooker (Harvard Common Press)
- 1979 Included in Vermont Images program involved six visual artists, two musicians and a poet
  - Wood Art Gallery, Montpelier, Vermont
  - One Man Show, McManus Studio Lobby, Theatre London, London, Canada from "The Ambrose Small Collection"
- 1982 One Man Show, The Howell Gallery, London, Canada
  - showed the Rosa Bonheur Series (18 paintings)
  - Cranford Series (13 drawings)
  - Circus Parade (8 paintings)
  - 17 other paintings
- 1983 Included in Canadian Art Collection, University of Western Ontario, McIntosh Gallery, London, Ontario
- 1984 Included in Contemporary Art Workshop: Ways of Drawing, curated by Harold Haydon, 542 W. Grant Place, Chicago
  - New England Press Association, Best Illustration, Daily, Class 1, First Place, Times Argus
- 1985 Included in The Brock Street Gallery, Kingston, Canada
  - 28 February 1985, Anna P. Baker died in Kingston, Ontario from cancer
  - 1985 One Man Show, Hang Ups Gallery, London, Canada
  - A Memorial Tribute by Friends
  - One Man Show, Catamount Film and Arts Center Gallery, St. Johnsbury, Vermont (40 paintings and drawings)
  - One Man Show, Spencer Room Gallery, D.B.Weldon Library, University of Western Ontario, London, Ontario
- 1988 Induction of Anna Baker as the first member of the South Collegiate Hall of Fame, in London, Ontario
  - May 1988 (60th Anniversary of the School)
