= Nan Bangs McKinnell =

American ceramics artist and educator

- Born: Nan Bangs; July 1, 1913; Stanton, Nebraska, U.S.
- Died: August 9, 2012 (aged 99)
- Education: Teacher’s College in Wayne, Nebraska (now Wayne State College), University of Washington
- Known for: Ceramics
- Spouse: James McKinnell (married 1948–2005)

Nan Bangs McKinnell (1913–2012) was an American ceramicist and educator. Nan was a founding member of the National Council on Education for the Ceramic Arts, a member of the American Craft Council College of Fellows, along with receiving several awards for her work. James "Jim" McKinnell (1919–2005), her spouse, was also a ceramicist and they made some collaborative work.

== Early life and education ==
Nan Bangs was born July 1, 1913, in Stanton, Nebraska. As a child, her mother started Nan and her brother on piano lessons, an appreciation for the arts at a young age. As Nan got older, this skill served her well and was able to earn money playing for churches and performances. Nan was always drawn to the arts, spending her free time either at the piano or painting and drawing. Her parents encouraged her artistic spirit, providing her with private art lessons at nine. After graduating high school, Nan aspired to become a teacher, however with money being tight and higher education for women being uncommon at the time, her father was unsure. Being determined, Nan found a job working at the student supply store at Wayne State Teacher's College. The woman who ran the store, having just lost her shop hand, hired Nan on the spot and offered her room and board. Being in the right place at the right time and now employed, Nan was able to convince her father to help with tuition while she worked to earn her teaching certificate. Nan taught at a one-room school house for a year before returning to college and received her BFA in Music and Education. She taught at a town school in Nebraska for several years after graduating, but by 1940, she was dissatisfied with life and work in Nebraska and decided to move to Seattle.

In Seattle, Nan began working as a teacher once again, earning money to help support her family back in Nebraska. It wasn't long until Nan was applying for graduate school, and after a few years in Seattle, she was taking summer classes at the University of Washington where she started her art. While the men were away at war, Nan began teaching in an architectural drawing and design classes at the university. As she continued her own studies, Nan realized that painting and design were not her forte and took an introductory class in ceramic engineering and was drawn to clay as an artistic medium.

In 1946, European ceramist Paul Bonifas came to found a ceramics department at the University and Nan. Despite only having minimal training in clay and French was asked to be his assistant. While working as Bonifa's assistant, Nan met James "Jim" McKinnell, a student in one of his classes. The two shared a love for the beauty in pottery and had a strong intellectual appreciation for developments in form, function, and technology. They dated in college and were married in 1948 in Baltimore, Maryland, after Nan had completed her senior thesis project. She attended college in Wayne, Nebraska gaining a bachelor's degree in music and education and later received a M.F.A. degree in ceramics from the University of Washington.

== Career ==
Nan's style was heavily influenced by contemporary and industrial design and her early work had a heavy focus on functionality. Her master's thesis project was a full tea set designed for mass production.

Nan and Jim spent much of their married life traveling and creating together. The two are remembered as artistic partners with most of their work having been made collaboratively. The two traveled across America and the world, working at colleges and artist's colonies while developing their craft. In 1953, Nan and James attended a ceramics workshop at the Archie Bray Foundation and decided to stay and work there for several years. It was at the Bray where Nan began developing glazes. Nan's deep copper glaze is still widely used today. Her glaze-making also opened up an appreciation for the decorative side of ceramics. As Nan and Jim began working more collaboratively, Nan's decorative eye came out more. In their process, often one would throw a piece on the wheel and the other would decorate it, combining their two separate artistic eyes and influences. Nan was drawn to natural shapes and forms, drawing on flowers, leaves, insects, and other animals.

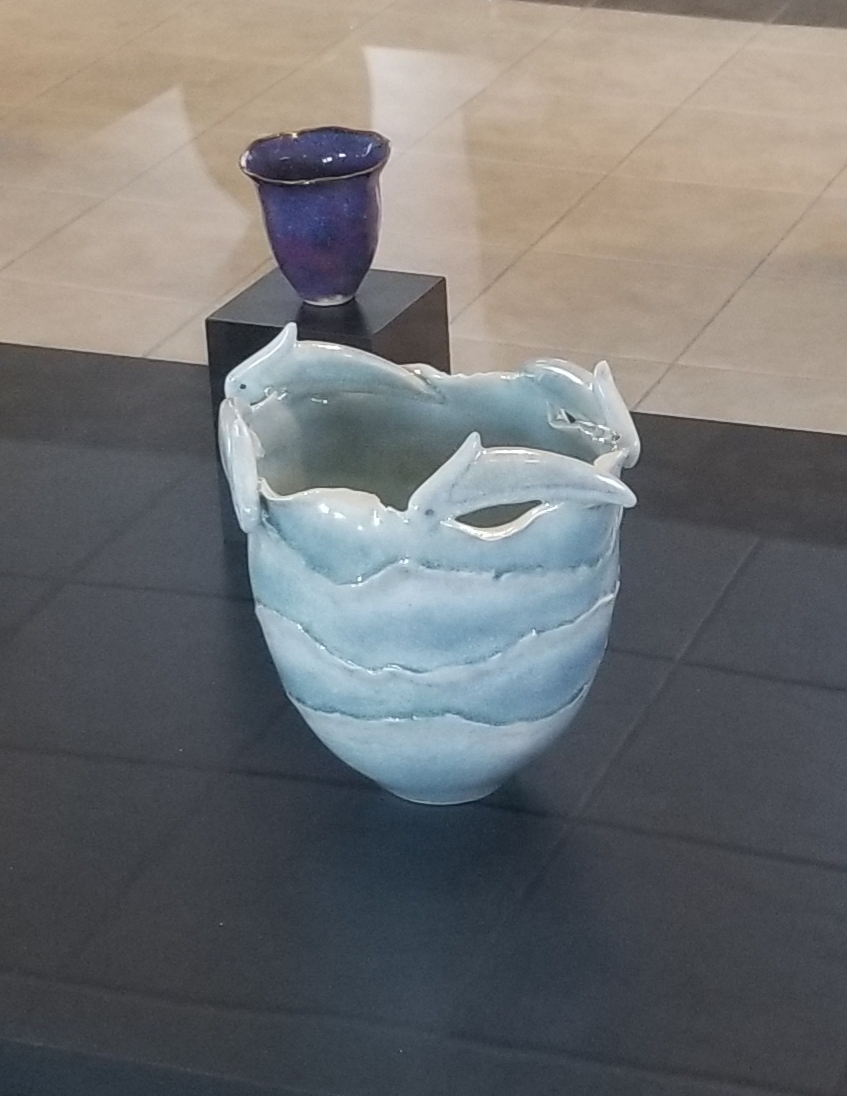
"Dolphin Vase" by Nan Bangs McKinnell

=== Themes ===
Nan had a certain affinity for teapots. She loved sharing tea with friends and collected teapots and tea sets made by friends and colleagues as well as making many of her own. She often used teapots as teaching tools for examples of functionality, form, technique, glazing and decoration.

== Exhibitions ==
=== Solo exhibitions ===
- 1993 – "Clay and Fire: A Journey", a retrospective of both Nan and Jim McKinnell's work, Vicki Myhren Gallery, University of Denver, Denver, Colorado, U.S.
- 2003 – "Still Fired Up", The Evergreen Gallery, Evergreen, Colorado, U.S.
- 2012 – "Tea Time with Nan McKinnell", Lincoln Center, Fort Collins, Colorado, U.S.
- 2013 – "The Clay Connection: Jim and Nan McKinnell", American Museum of Ceramic Art (AMOCA), Pomona, California, U.S.

=== Group exhibitions ===
- 1963 – "9th International Exhibition of Ceramic Art," invitational, Kiln Club of Washington, DC at the Smithsonian Institution
- 1970 – Archie Bray Foundation Exhibition, Smithsonian Institution Sales Gallery, Washington, DC, U.S.
- 1974 – "The Second Chunichi International Ceramic Art Exhibition," Oriental Nakamura Art Gallery, Nagoya, Japan
- 2011 – "Uncommon Ground: Impact and Influence," NCECA with Arvada Center for the Arts and Humanities, Arvada, Colorado, U.S.
- 2012 – "Women of Influence: Colorado Artist's and Curators," Arvada Center for the Arts and Humanities, Arvada, Colorado, U.S.

== Public collections ==
- ASU Art Museum, Arizona State University, Tempe, Arizona, U.S.
- Archie Bray Foundation Ceramics Collection, Helena, Montana, U.S.
- CU Art Museum, University of Colorado at Boulder, Boulder, Colorado, U.S.
- Everson Museum of Art, Syracuse, New York, U.S.
- Trellis Vase (2004), Kirkland Museum of Fine & Decorative Art, Denver, Colorado, U.S.
- History Colorado Center, Decorative Arts Collection, Denver, Colorado, U.S.
- Minnesota Museum of American Art, St. Paul, Minnesota, U.S.
- James and Nan McKinnell cup (1962), National Museum of American History, Smithsonian Institution, Washington, DC, U.S.
- National Museum of Scotland, Edinburgh, Scotland

== Awards and honors ==
- In 1977, Citation of Merit and lifetime Honorary Membership from the National Council of Ceramic Arts, alongside Jim McKinnell.
- In 1988, inducted into the American Craft Council College of Fellows, alongside Jim McKinnell.
- Founding member of the National Council on Education for the Ceramic Arts.
- Received the Colorado Artist Craftsmen's first Lifetime Service Award.
- Received the Colorado Governor's Award for Excellence in the Arts and Humanities.
- "Time in Tandem" (2003) a video documentary on the McKinnell's and their legacy.

== Bibliography ==
- Armstrong Schoch, David W.; Armstrong Schoch, Susan (2013). The Clay Connection: Jim and Nan McKinnell. American Museum of Ceramic Art (AMOCA). ISBN 978-0981672892.
