= Muriel Sibell Wolle =

American artist

Muriel Sibell Wolle, née Muriel Vincent Sibell (1898–1977) was an American artist best known for her drawings and paintings of mining communities in the western states.

== Biography ==
Born in Brooklyn, New York, she graduated from the New York School of Fine and Applied Arts in 1920 with diplomas in advertising and costume design. After graduation, she accepted a teaching position at the Texas State College for Women in Denton, Texas, then served as an instructor in Art at the Parsons School of Design from 1923 to 1926. After a trip to Colorado in 1926, Sibell began looking for a teaching position in the West. She received a B.S. in Art Education from New York University, and later received an M.A. in English Literature from the University of Colorado. She started teaching at the University of Colorado Boulder in 1926, and served as head of the Department of Fine Arts from 1928 to 1947, adding many options to the department while presiding over its extraordinary growth.

She was not only the grande dame of the Fine Arts Department during the first half of the 20th century, but also an early champion of civil rights, accepting minorities into the Fine Arts program when some other programs informally declined to do so. During WWII, she mentored and championed the first black member of the fine arts honorary, Dolores Hale, and invited her to her home on many occasions during a time in Boulder when interracial socializing happened very rarely.

Upon her arrival in Colorado, she was struck by the beauty of the mountains and began traveling into deserted mountain mining towns to sketch the remains of communities that were fast disappearing. Her sketches and watercolors provide an invaluable record of the otherwise forgotten and lost ghost towns of Colorado and the West. Sibell also authored many articles and several books about the history of the disappearing ghost towns. She became a nationally recognized author with the publication of Stampede to Timberline, The Bonanza Trail, Montana Pay Dirt, and Timberline Tailings, which she both authored and illustrated. Stampede to Timberline went through fourteen printings, becoming a definitive guidebook for ghost town enthusiasts, although many residents objected to having their towns depicted as such.

Starting in 1928, Sibell designed sets and costumes for many theater productions on campus, including the operettas written and directed by her future husband, English professor Francis Wolle. In 1930 she received an M.A. in English Literature for a thesis on Shakespearean costuming. Sibell and Wolle were married in 1945 after a friendship of 18 years. They were members of St. Aidan's Church, and she was active in helping her husband, who became an ordained perpetual deacon in the Episcopal Church following his retirement from the university in 1959. Sibell Wolle retired from the University of Colorado Boulder in 1966.

Sibell Wolle was active in numerous civic organizations, such as the Soroptomist Club, Delta Phi Delta, the Boulder Artist's Guild, and received many honors and prizes for her professional work. She was chosen in 1947 as a faculty research lecturer for the university, the first woman to be so honored. She designed the original George Norlin Award medal for the university, and in 1957 received one herself. She was also awarded the University of Colorado's Robert Stearns Award for outstanding faculty or staff in 1966, and in 1976 was honored as one of its "Alumni of the Century." To the end of her life she remained active in her community and continued to keep her artistic record of America's mining past. She was also an avid collector of Southwestern Native American art.

Muriel Sibell Wolle died on January 9, 1977. The University of Colorado Board of Regents moved to change the name of the Fine Arts Building to the Muriel Sibell Wolle Fine Arts Building, in their meeting of April 20, 1978. The building was demolished in January 2008 to make way for the new Visual Arts Complex. In March 2008, St. Aidan's Episcopal Church dedicated the Muriel Sibell Wolle Gallery in her honor.

== Works ==
- Ghost Cities of Colorado: a pictorial record of Central City, Black Hawk, Nevadaville. 1933.
- Cloud Cities of Colorado: a pictorial record of Leadville, Robinson, Kokomo, Climax, Fairplay, Breckenridge. 1934.
- Stampede to Timerline: the ghost towns and mining camps of Colorado. 1949.
- The Bonanza Trail: ghost towns and mining camps of the West. 1953.
- Montana Pay Dirt: a guide to the mining camps of the Treasure State. 1963.
- Timberline Tailings: tales of Colorado's ghost towns and mining camps. 1977.
