= Olga Ross Hannon =

American art professor and instructor (1890-1947)

- Born: Olga Ross Hannon; September 15, 1890; Moline, Illinois
- Died: May 4, 1947; Wickenburg, Arizona
- Occupation: Art professor
- Employer: Montana State University
- Known for: Art professor, national president of Delta Phi Delta, editor of MEA

Olga Ross Hannon (September 15, 1890 - 1947) was an art professor at Montana State College (now known as Montana State University) from 1921 to 1947. As an artist she is known for mountain landscape and Indian culture paintings.

== Early life and education ==
Olga E. Ross was born on September 15, 1890, to Peter M. and Caroline Ross in Moline, Illinois. She had one brother, Arthur E. Ross.

She attended the Chicago Academy of Fine Arts, graduating in 1911. She then studied at the New York School of Fine and Applied Arts; the Snow-Froehlick School of Industrial Arts in Chicago; and the Art Students League of New York.

== Teaching career ==
In 1916 Olga Ross Hannon was head of the art department at Ferry Hall, Lake Forest, Illinois. She then moved to Sheridan, Wyoming, where she taught high school, and finally to Bozeman, Montana.

Hannon taught art at Montana State College from 1921 to 1947. Her purpose was to "prepare students for a practical realization of their talents". She was the head of applied art from 1941 to 1947. Hannon served as acting dean of the Household and Industrial Arts Department from 1944 to 1945. John C. Ewers wrote that "these tipis were of religious significance, being part of a complex of sacred objects and rituals and taboos surrounding the Indian owners as long as they possessed the tipis."

As the head of the Art Department, Hannon granted $300 to Frances Senska and her first students, among whom several World War II veterans, to create a ceramics studio in the basement of Herrick Hall.

Outside of the classroom, Hannon founded the Montana State College chapter of the art honorary Delta Phi Delta and served as the national president for eight years. She was also a sponsor of the college art club and SPURS National Honor Society, "a sophomore women's service organization."

== Art career ==
Hannon had an art career beyond Montana State College. She also served as the Montana representative for the American Artists Professional League. Hannon organized the Bozeman Chapter of the American Federation of the Arts, held a membership in the Western Association of Museum Directors, and held various offices in the Montana Education Association.

She also contributed regularly to professional and educational publications and served on the selection committee for Montana paintings and sculptures to be exhibited at the New York World’s Fair in 1939.

Throughout her time at Montana State College, Hannon continued creating her own art. She primarily worked in oils and watercolors, but she also occasionally did lithography, etching, and wood block printing. Her subjects included Montana Native Americans and historic sites in Montana. Hannon also collected "Indian, Oriental, and Mexican arts and crafts" and spearheaded a project to preserve painted designs on Blackfeet lodges through silk screening.

== Personal life ==
On January 6, 1916, Olga Ross married Irving Hannon, who died a short time later.

Olga Ross Hannon retired in 1947. She died two months later on May 4, 1947, in Wickenburg, Arizona. She is buried at Moline Memorial Park, Moline.

== Legacy ==
Hannon Hall, built in 1954, is one of the remaining two all-women's residence halls at MSU. Photographs collected or taken by Hannon are held at Montana State University's Archives and Special Collections. The subject matter for these photographs includes indigenous peoples and indigenous lodge designs, accompanied by a large selection of postcards and artwork by Hannon and indigenous artists.
