= Donald Frith =

American ceramic artist (1924–2021)

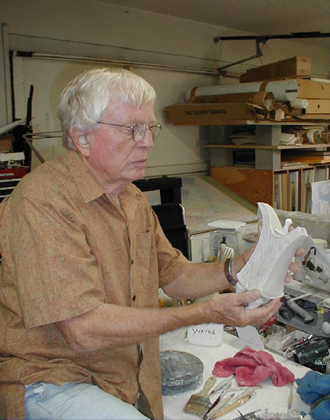
- Frith creating a new teapot
- Born: September 16, 1924; Denver, Colorado
- Died: January 6, 2021 (aged 96); Goleta, California
- Occupations: Professor of ceramics and jewelry
- Known for: Designing teapots
- Spouse: Barbara Tepfer (married 1949–2007)
- Children: 4

Donald Eugene Frith (/friTH/ /frɪθ/; September 16, 1924 – January 6, 2021) was an American ceramic artist and academic known for his unique style of teapots, mixing ceramics with acrylics and wood.

Frith was a faculty member at the University of Illinois Urbana-Champaign from 1952 until his retirement in 1989, and was the chair of the crafts department for many years. He then became a professor emeritus.

He was one of the first artists that made a three-point handle teapot. An early example of the "three handle teapot" was pictured in the ceramics book A Potter’s Handbook. He specialized in production design work, with his knowledge of molds. He wrote the book Mold Making for Ceramics ISBN 0801975395. This book became the definitive reference worldwide on mold making in craft ceramics production.

== Early life and education ==
Frith was born in Denver, Colorado. A World War II veteran, Frith served in the United States Navy as a Seabee in the Philippines.

He received his Bachelor of Fine Arts in 1949 and Master of Arts (MA) from Denver University. He lived in San Bernardino, California for three years in this period. He was awarded on two occasions a Danforth Foundation grant to study at the Alfred University where he received a Master of Fine Arts in 1966.

== Career ==
In 1952, Frith was hired as assistant professor of ceramics and jewelry at the University of Illinois Urbana-Champaign, and went on the serve as head of the crafts department for 40 years, and then became a professor emeritus. He started the glass, metals and ceramics programs at that university.

Frith was among the artists in an exhibition called "American Craftsman" at the Dallas Museum of Art from February 19 to March 11, 1956.

He also worked as a product designer for three pottery companies.

Frith served as founding member of the Illinois Crafts Council and the National Council on Education for the Ceramic Arts (NCECA).

Frith had a solo exhibition at the Art Institute of Chicago from January 11 to March 29, 1964. The exhibit was called "Ceramics and Jewelry by Donald E. Frith".

In 1966 the American Craft Council awarded him a National Merit Award and in 1971 he was awarded Fellow of the council by NCECA. He has served as officer of the Design Division Award for outstanding contribution to the field. He was elected to the board of Trustees of the American Ceramic Society to serve three-year term in 1986. In 1991 he was awarded Fellow of the Society by the American Ceramic Society.

Frith and his wife moved to Santa Maria, California in 1989 after he retired as a university professor. That is where he developed his favorite artistic form, intricate teapots shaped like flowers with complex wooden handles.

He had a solo exhibition at the Beatrice Wood Center for the Arts in Ojai, California from November 1 to December 31, 2008.

In 2017, the San Luis Obispo Museum of Art held an exhibition of Frith's work from September 1 through to October 29, 2017.

Frith's work is in permanent collections including the Georgia Museum of Art, Contemporary Crafts Museum in New York City, Lakeview Art Center in Peoria, Illinois, The Art Institute of Chicago, Saint Louis Art Museum, Krannert Art Museum, U of I, Illinois State Museum, High Museum of Art, Atlanta, Georgia, Evansville Museum of Arts, History and Science, Museum of Arts and Design, New York City.

== Personal life ==
He met his wife Barbara (née Tepfer) at Denver University, and they were married in 1949. They had four children and lived in Champaign-Urbana, Illinois for many years. In 1989, the couple moved to Santa Maria, California to continue creating art in retirement. Barbara, also an artist, died in 2007. They had been married for 58 years.
