= SPURS National Honor Society =

Collegiate sophomore honor society

- SPURS badge
- Founded: February 14, 1922; 104 years ago Montana State University
- Type: Service and Honor society
- Affiliation: Independent
- Status: Defunct
- Defunct date: May 31, 2006
- Emphasis: Sophomore women
- Scope: National
- Motto: "At Your Service"
- Pillars: Service, Patriotism, Unity, Responsibility, and Sacrifice
- Colors: Blue and Gold
- Symbol: Spur
- Flower: Yellow chrysanthemum
- Publication: The Spur
- Chapters: 0 active
- Headquarters: United States

SPURS National Honor Society was an American collegiate sophomore honor society. It was established in 1922 at Montana State University and disbanded in 2005. Several chapters remain in operation as independent, local societies.

== History ==
SPURS was founded at Montana State University at Bozeman as an honor society and service club for sophomore women in 1922. It was sponsored by the local chapter of Mortar Board honor society to support and encourage student service to the university. Its purpose was to encourage women to have loyalty and to serve the university and to promote and support school spirit, campuswide student events, and campus traditions,

Chapters were established at smaller colleges and universities in the United States. Most chapters volunteered to help with freshmen orientation and homecoming, tutored, and ushered for campus events. Originally a women-only organization, its male counterpart was the Intercollegiate Knights. Its alumnae association for juniors was called the Stirips. SPURS became co-educational in 1976.

By 2006, the honor society was down to eleven active chapters, with only half being strong. There was also a lack of interest in members filling national officers. The national SPURS organization dissolved on May 31, 2006 by decision of its October 2005 national convention. After SPURS ceased operations, a few chapters continued as local honor societies. The chapter at Linfield College continued as a local honor society that included sophomores, juniors, and seniors. Students at the University of Arizona reinstalled SPURS as a club in 2017.

The Montana State University SPURS chapter decided to merge with the MSU Student Alumni Foundation the following year, along with the dissolved society Fangs which was a branch of the Intercollegiate Knights. The alumni association holds SPURS and Fangs reunions. It also coordinated the Spurs & Fangs/Student Alumni Association.

== Symbols ==
The name SPURS was the monogram of the society's pillars: Service, Patriotism, Unity, Responsibility, and Sacrifice. Its motto was "At Your Service".

The SPURS badge was a small gold spur attached to a chain. Its colors were blue and gold. Members wore dresses of blue and gold when volunteering for the university. Its flower was the yellow chrysanthemum. Its quarterly newsletter was called The Spur.

SPURS celebrated its Founders' Day annually on February 14.

== Membership ==
Members were sophomores who were selected for their academic accomplishments, leadership, and student activities. They were required to have a GPA 3.0 or better. Potential members were recruited and initiated at the end of their freshman year.

== Chapters ==
Following is a list of known SPURS chapters, with inactive institutions in italics.

Number	Charter date and range	Institution	Location	Status	Ref.
1	February 14, 1922 – May 31, 2006	Montana State University	Bozeman, Montana	Withdrew (local)	(Note: Merged with the university's alumni foundation to form SPURS and Fangs Student/Alumni Association (local).)
	Before 1928	Oregon State University	Corvallis, Oregon	Inactive	
	1925	University of Utah	Salt Lake City, Utah	Inactive	
5	1925	University of Puget Sound	Tacoma, Washington	Withdrew (ΦΕΣ)	(Note: Rather than dissolving with the closure of its national, the chapter joined Phi Eta Sigma National Honor Society.)
	1928	Utah State University	Logan, Utah	Inactive	
	1931	Colorado State University	Fort Collins, Colorado	Inactive	
	1931 – May 31, 2006	University of Redlands	Redlands, California	Inactive	
15	April 8, 1933	Butler University	Indianapolis, Indiana	Inactive	
	1937 – May 31, 2006	University of Arizona	Tucson, Arizona	Inactive	(Note: Chapter reformed as a local honor society in 2017.)
	1942	Washington State University	Pullman, Washington	Inactive	
	1947 – May 31, 2006	Linfield College	McMinnville, Oregon	Withdrew (local)	(Note: The chapter originated as the Daughters of Tradition (local), established before 1935.) (Note: After the dissolution of the national organization, the chapter at Linfield College continued operations as a local honor society of the same name. The club expanded to include juniors and seniors, abandoning its sophomore-only rule.)
	c. 1947	University of New Mexico	Albuquerque, New Mexico	Inactive	
	1949	Idaho State University	Pocatello, Idaho	Inactive	
	1950	Whitman College	Walla Walla, Washington	Inactive	
	October 1951-November 1989	Gonzaga University	Spokane, Washington	Inactive	(Note: Separated from National Organization in November 1989 and became the Setons)
	1955	Arizona State University	Tempe, Arizona	Inactive	
	1955	University of the Pacific	Stockton, California	Inactive	
	1957	University of Texas at El Paso	El Paso, Texas	Inactive	
	1958	New Mexico State University	Las Cruces, New Mexico	Inactive	
	1960	California State University, Long Beach	Long Beach, California	Inactive	
	1961	Adams State College	Alamosa, Colorado	Inactive	
	1964	University of Nevada, Reno	Reno, Nevada	Inactive	
	1965	California State University, Fresno	Fresno, California	Inactive	
	1965	Emporia State University	Emporia, Kansas	Inactive	
	1966	Eastern New Mexico University	Portales, New Mexico	Inactive	
	1966	Jamestown College	Jamestown, North Dakota	Inactive	
	1966	University of Idaho	Moscow, Idaho	Inactive	
	1966	Wichita State University	Wichita, Kansas	Inactive	
	1967	Fort Wright College	Toppenish, Washington	Inactive	
	October 14, 1967	Marylhurst University	Marylhurst, Oregon	Inactive	
	1968	University of Northern Colorado	Greeley, Colorado	Inactive	(Note: Chapter formed at Colorado State College, now the University of Northern Colorado.)
	1969	Minnesota State University, Mankato	Mankato, Minnesota	Inactive	
	1974	Fort Hays State University	Hays, Kansas	Inactive	
		Brigham Young University	Provo, Utah	Inactive	
		California Lutheran University	Thousand Oaks, California	Inactive	
		California State University, Chico	Chico, California	Inactive	
		Carroll University	Waukesha, Wisconsin	Inactive	
		Central Washington University	Ellensburg, Washington	Inactive	
		Colorado Women's College	Aurora, Colorado	Inactive	(Note: The college merged with the University of Denver in 1982.)
		Eastern Washington University	Cheney, Washington	Inactive	
		Humboldt State University	Arcata, California	Inactive	
	19xx ?–1995	Kansas State University	Manhattan, Kansas	Withdrew (local)	(Note: Chapter formed from the Sparks (local), established in the 1920s. It withdrew from the SPURS and became the Silver Sparks (local).)
		Montana State University Billings	Billings, Montana	Inactive	
		Minnesota State University Moorhead	Moorhead, Minnesota	Inactive	
		Montana Tech of the University of Montana	Butte, Montana	Inactive	
		New Mexico Highlands University	Las Vegas, New Mexico	Inactive	
		Northern Arizona University	Flagstaff, Arizona	Inactive	
		Northern Montana University	Havre, Montana	Inactive	
		Northern State University	Aberdeen, South Dakota	Inactive	
		University of Denver	Denver, Colorado	Inactive	
		Pacific Lutheran University	Parkland, Washington	Inactive	
		Pacific University	Forest Grove, Oregon	Inactive	
		Rocky Mountain College	Billings, Montana	Inactive	
		San Diego State University	San Diego, California	Inactive	
		Seattle University	Seattle, Washington	Inactive	
		University of Alaska Fairbanks	College, Alaska	Inactive	
		University of California, Santa Barbara	Santa Barbara, California	Inactive	
		University of California, Los Angeles	Los Angeles, California	Inactive	
		University of Colorado	Boulder, Colorado	Inactive	
		University of Great Falls	Great Falls, Montana	Inactive	
		University of Mary	Bismarck, North Dakota	Inactive	
		University of Minnesota	Minneapolis and Saint Paul, Minnesota,	Inactive	
		University of Montana	Missoula, Montana	Inactive	
		University of Nebraska at Kearney	Kearney, Nebraska	Inactive	
		University of Nevada, Las Vegas	Paradise, Nevada	Inactive	
		University of Portland	Portland, Oregon	Inactive	
		University of Wyoming	Laramie, Wyoming	Inactive	
		Western Montana College	Dillon, Montana	Inactive	
