= John Balistreri =

American ceramic artist

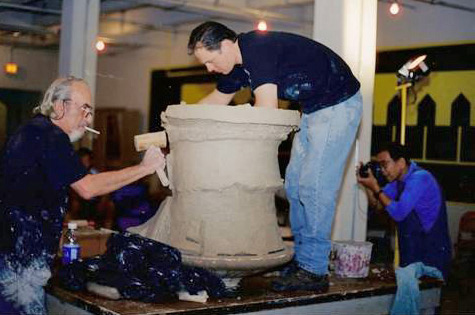
- John Balistreri (right) assisting Peter Voulkos (left).
- Born: 1962 (age 63–64)
- Known for: Ceramic art

John Balistreri (born 1962) is an American ceramic artist best known for his large-scale sculptures. He is currently a professor of Art and the head of the ceramic art program at Bowling Green State University, Bowling Green, Ohio, USA.

== Biography ==
Born in Denver in 1962, Balistreri initially worked for his family greenhouse business, during which time he developed an interest in ceramics, building his first gas-fired kiln on the property. He obtained an associate degree from Colorado Mountain College, and later went on to study fine art at Kansas City Art Institute in 1986, before pursuing a master's degree at Kent State University in 1988. He built a 30 ft wood-fired kiln while at Kent State University, one of the largest in the country.

In 1996, Balistreri was named 'Head of Ceramics' at Bowling Green State University, with many of his students later becoming professors themselves.

Balistreri produces paintings and sculptures, but he is best known for his large-scale ceramic works. He developed techniques for ceramic 3D printing using digital technology for which he received two U.S. patents. His work has been exhibited at art galleries nationwide, including the Canton Museum of Art, Denver Art Museum, Daum Museum of Contemporary Art, and Kemper Museum of Contemporary Art.

== Collections ==
- Daum Museum of Contemporary Art
- Kemper Museum of Contemporary Art
- Canton Museum of Art (Ohio)
