= Harold G. Nelson =

American architect

Harold Glea Nelson (born March 4, 1943) is an American architect, consultant and former Nierenberg Distinguished Professor of Design in the School of Design at Carnegie Mellon University. In 2001, he served as president of the International Society for the Systems Sciences (ISSS). He is known as the co-author of The Design Way, a book considered by some to be the Rosetta Stone of Design.

== Biography ==
=== Youth and education ===
Nelson was born in 1943 in Western Montana as a fifth generation descendant of Swedish homesteaders. He grew up on a small farm at the foot of the Bob Marshall Wilderness. Upon graduating high school, he enlisted in the US Navy and served four years as a guided missile technician.

After completing his service, he enrolled in Montana State University, working summers as a fire guard and hotshot with the National Interagency Hotshot Crew. Nelson received his Bachelor of Architecture in 1970 from Montana State University, where he was member of the Delta Phi Delta Art and Architecture Honorary Society. He continued to study architecture and ceramic design at the Technical University and Ateneum Fine Arts Academy in Finland. He continued his architectural education at the University of California Berkeley where he took classes from Christopher Alexander and received his Master of Architecture "with distinction" in 1973.

At the University of California he continued to study the interface of systems thinking and design and received his Ph.D. with distinction in 1979. His dissertation, entitled Energy Resource Development and Community: Vanishing Community, Bloom Town, Home Town, focused on a systems approach to the impact on rural communities of large-scale resource development projects with an emphasis on value distribution assessment. In 2015 Dr. Nelson was invited to give a seminar to the design team at the corporate headquarters of Apple Inc. in California.

=== Further career ===
As a licensed architect in the State of California, Nelson worked for seven years as an assistant regional architect for Region Five of the U.S. Forest Service from 1976 to 1982. In this position he designed and oversaw the construction of two visitor's centers. One of which—Chilao—is now in a National Monument and has become iconic.

Nelson began his teaching career at Texas Tech University as Assistant Professor from 1982 to 1984, where he was awarded the "President's Award for Excellence in Teaching" in 1984. After another year at the Montana State University, and two years at the Saybrook Institute, he was core faculty at Antioch University from 1987 to 1999, and extended faculty at the University of Washington from 2002 to at least 2008. He has been a Senior Lecturer at the Navy Postgraduate School in Monterey California since 2007.

At the Antioch University Nelson served for twelve years as the Director (Department Head) of the Graduate Programs in Whole Systems Design (WSD). One program was recognized by U.S. News & World Report as among the Top Ten graduate programs in Organizational Development. Further, he has been involved with diverse organizations including: non-profits and corporations, state and federal agencies, international governments, and the United Nations. He has consulted, or lectured in: Chile, Turkey, Finland, Sweden, Indonesia, and Australia. He is working as an education consultant for universities, governmental agencies, and business organizations.

The 2003 book by Harold G. Nelson and Erik Stolterman, entitled The Design Way: Intentional Change in an Unpredictable World; Foundations and Fundamentals of Design Competence, was awarded the Outstanding Book of the Year award by the Association for Educational Communications and Technology in 2004.

== Work ==
Nelson's research interests are in the fields of complex systems inquiry, complex organizational systems design, advanced design education in formal and informal settings, deep design/critique and advanced design postulation and axiom development. His focus is in two areas: the first is on the development of design competent organizations, and the second is on innovation leadership.

Nelson is particularly known for the 2003 book The Design Way, co-authored with Erik Stolterman. John Zimmerman et al. (2007) summarized:

... in their book, The Design Way, Harold Nelson and Erik Stolterman frame interaction design—and more generally the practice of design—as a broad culture of inquiry and action. They claim that rather than focusing on problem solving to avoid undesirable states, designers work to frame problems in terms of intentional actions that lead to a desirable and appropriate state of reality. Design is viewed as a unique way to look at the human condition, and is understood through reflective practice, intellectual apperception, and intentional choice. The practice of design is framed as encompassing the real, the true, and the ideal; design research is framed as research on a condition that arises from a number of phenomena in combination, rather than the study of a single phenomenon in isolation.

Cucchiara reviewed that which The design way : intentional change in an unpredictable world charts "a path to navigate complexity in the design of real additions to the world."

== Selected publications ==
Nelson has written one book and more than twenty articles, and has given more than 50 presentations world wide.

- Nelson, Harold G. Energy Resource Development and Community: Vanishing Community, Bloom Town, Home Town. PhD thesis University of California, Berkeley, 1979.
- Nelson, Harold G. and Erik Stolterman. The design way : intentional change in an unpredictable world : foundations and fundamentals of design competence. Englewood Cliffs, N.J. : Educational Technology Publications. 2003; 2nd edition, 2012.

Articles, a selection:

- Nelson, Harold G. "The Necessity of Being 'Undisciplined' and 'Out of Control': Design Action and Systems Thinking". In: Performance Improvement Quarterly, 1994, Vol. 7, No.3 (22-29).
- Nelson, Harold G. and Erik Stolterman. "The Case for Design; Creating a Culture of Intention". in: Educational Technology, Nov.-Dec. 2000, Vol. XL, No. 6, (29-35).
