= Jimmy Greenock =

Scottish footballer

Personal information
- Full name: James Sneddon Greenock
- Date of birth: 5 April 1930
- Place of birth: Motherwell, Scotland
- Date of death: 13 April 2005 (aged 75)
- Place of death: Balfron, Scotland
- Position: Left half

Senior career*
| Years | Team | Apps | (Gls) |
| 19xx–1951 | Wishaw Juniors | | |
| 1951–1959 | Queen of the South | 188 | (13) |
| 1959–1961 | Falcons S.C. | | |
- * Club domestic league appearances and goals

James Greenock (5 April 1930 – April 2005) was a Scottish former professional footballer who played as a left half for Queen of the South.

== Career ==
Jimmy Greenock was born in Motherwell and was originally a Motherwell supporter. Greenock was keen to play for them, however despite two trials and scoring for them he failed to earn a contract as he wasn't home when they tried to contact him.

During his career he played predominantly as left half which would be a modern-day central midfielder. Greenock started his playing career at Wishaw Juniors before joining the Doonhamers in July 1951.

Greenock played for Queens for eight seasons in the First Division from 1951 to 1959 in what was considered their most successful era under manager Jimmy McKinnell Junior. During his time at Dumfries Greenock made 188 league appearances scoring 13 goals. In total Greenock made 236 appearances for Queens although he failed to make any appearances during the 1955–56 season due to a serious injury.

At the end of the 1958–59 season Greenock had his contract terminated following Queens' relegation to the Second Division. Following his release he emigrated to the USA and joined American soccer club the Falcons S.C., based in Elizabeth, New Jersey.

== Death ==
Greenock died following a long illness and was buried on 18 April 2005 just 13 days after his 75th birthday.

== Club career statistics ==
| Club | Season | League | |
| Club | Season | Apps | Goals |
|---|---|---|---|
| Queen of the South | 1951–52 | 26 | 0 |
| Queen of the South | 1952–53 | 29 | 5 |
| Queen of the South | 1953–54 | 30 | 3 |
| Queen of the South | 1954–55 | 22 | 2 |
| Queen of the South | 1955–56 | 0 | 0 |
| Queen of the South | 1956–57 | 25 | 1 |
| Queen of the South | 1957–58 | 32 | 1 |
| Queen of the South | 1958–59 | 24 | 1 |
| Total | | 188 | 13 |
