= Karen Autio =

Finnish-Canadian writer

Karen Autio is a Finnish Canadian writer of children's fiction. She has written a historical novel trilogy about a young immigrant girl Saara Mäki and her adventures in 1910s Canada amongst other children's books.

== Early life and education ==
Karen Autio was born in Fort William, Ontario, and grew up in the area, now called Thunder Bay. She lives currently in Kelowna, British Columbia. She studied mathematics and computer science at the University of Waterloo and worked as a software developer before starting her writing career.

== Writing career ==
Her first novel, Second Watch (Sonoris Press 2005), is set around the wreck of the RMS Empress of Ireland in 1914. Young Saara is one of the few surviving children in the disaster that took more than 1,000 lives. In the sequel, Saara's Passage (2008), Saara takes care of her mother who is treated for tuberculosis. In Sabotage (2013), Saara and her younger brother Jussi grow up in Port Arthur, Ontario, during the First World War.

== Works ==
- Second Watch (2005), ISBN 1-55039-151-8
- Saara's Passage (2008), ISBN 978-1-55039-168-8
- Sabotage (2013), ISBN 978-1-55039-208-1
- Kah-Lan the Adventurous Sea Otter (2015), ISBN 978-1-55039-208-1
