= The Chronicle (Barton, Vermont) =

Vermont, United States newspaper

Barton Chronicle
- Type: Weekly newspaper
- Format: Tabloid
- Publisher: Tracy Davis Pierce
- Editor: Joseph Gresser
- Founded: 1974
- Headquarters: Barton, Orleans, Vermont
- Website: bartonchronicle.com

The Chronicle is a weekly newspaper published in Barton, Vermont. Circulation was 8,500 in 1998. The paper had 260 original subscribers in 1974 and this figure grew to 7500 by the time the paper was sold to a group of employees in 2015.

== History ==
The Chronicle was founded in 1974 by Chris and Ellen Braithwaite, and their partner, Edward Cowan, a Washington reporter with the New York Times. The paper was started with a $500 investment by Cowan, who was a silent partner in the paper until 1977 when the Braithwaites became the only owners. The Barton Chronicle was initially published out of the Braithwaites' farmhouse, which at the time relied exclusively on wood heat and had no running water. The paper moved to rented quarters on Upper Main Street in Barton in the spring of 1974, then into a farmhouse in West Glover the Braithwaites purchased in 1975 from the paper's star columnist, Loudon Young, for $10,000. The paper gradually added staff and readers, and gradually became "The Weekly Journal of Orleans County," which has a population of about 27,000 in Vermont's Northeast Kingdom. In 2015 the Braithwaites sold the newspaper to a group of its employees, who continue to publish it as a tabloid community newspaper.
