= Dwight Kirsch =

American, 1899 - 1981

Dwight Kirsch (1899–1981) was an artist, professor, and museum administrator who served as the director of the Nebraska Art Association, which would later become the Sheldon Museum of Art, from 1936 to 1950. During his tenure, he acquired some of the museum's most prestigious works, including Edward Hopper's Room in New York.

== Early life ==
Dwight Kirsch was born in Pawnee County, Nebraska, in 1899. Throughout his childhood, he was keenly interested in art, spending his time painting watercolors, taking photographs, and creating prints.
