= William Alexander Griffith =

American painter

- Born: August 19, 1866; Lawrence, Kansas, U.S.
- Died: May 25, 1940 (aged 73); Laguna Beach, California, U.S.
- Education: Washington University in St. Louis; Académie Julian
- Occupation: Painter
- Spouse: Ida Griffith
- Children: 2 sons, 3 daughters

William Alexander Griffith (August 19, 1866 – May 25, 1940) was an American painter and educator.

Griffith was educated at the St. Louis School of Fine Arts, and became the chair of the Art department at the University of Kansas for twenty-one years, and he co-founded of the art colony in Laguna Beach, California in 1919. He was the president of the Laguna Beach Art Association from 1920 to 1921, and from 1925 to 1927.
