= Jimmy McKinnell Sr. =

Scottish football manager

Jimmy McKinnell Sr. is best known for his lengthy service to Dumfries association football club, Queen of the South.

== Biography ==
McKinnell was a member of the original board when Queen of the South F.C. were formed by the merger of local clubs in March 1919 with the intention of forming a Dumfries club to compete on a national rather than a local level. He became treasurer in 1922 and in 1938 became Secretary / Manager.

In his only full season competing as manager in the Scottish League he took them to a sixth-place finish in the top tier — bettered by the club only in 1934 and equaled only in 1956. Early in his second season, football competition was dissolved at a national level due to the outbreak of World War II.

McKinnell retired in 1946 and was succeeded by his son, Jimmy McKinnell Jr. McKinnell senior was given a testimonial in 1947. He died in 1965 at the age of 93.
