= Intercollegiate Knights =

American collegiate honor service group

- IK
- Founded: 1922; 104 years ago University of Washington
- Type: Honor
- Affiliation: Independent
- Status: Active
- Emphasis: Service
- Scope: Local
- Motto: "Service, Sacrifice, and Loyalty"
- Member badge
- Colors: Flame Red and Royal Blue
- Chapters: 1 active
- Headquarters: Rolla, Missouri; United States

Intercollegiate Knights (IK) is an American collegiate honorary service group founded in 1922. Each chapter was oriented toward service to its campus. Although it once had 67 chapters, there is only one active chapter, at Missouri University of Science and Technology.

== History ==
The predecessor organization of Intercollegiate Knights was Knights of the Hook at University of Washington. Knights of the Hook was formed in 1919 to serve the university and promote its traditions. The name was chosen due to the group perceiving similarities between their duties and those of "the knighthood of old".

In 1922, the group was incorporated as the national Intercollegiate Knights in the state of Washington. The fraternity focused on "establishing and improving campus standards and worked with other Greek groups on events and fundraising".

During the next two years, the fraternity expanded to five other schools: the University of Montana, Montana State, Washington State University, the University of Idaho, and the University of Oregon. Its first national convention was in 1924 at Washington State University.

Over twenty chapters were chartered by the beginning of World War II, mostly in the Northwestern United States. However, during the war, only a few chapters continued to operate. In 1959, there were 35 active chapters, but by 1978, there were only sixteen. By 1990, the organization splintered with the few remaining chapters each going their own way.

Currently, the only active chapter is at the Missouri University of Science and Technology.

== Symbols ==
The Intercollegiate Knights' motto is "Service, Sacrifice, and Loyalty". Its national president was called the Royal King and its vice president was the Royal Duke.

Its colors were red and white in 1922. By 1947, those colors were Flame Red and Royal Blue.

== Chapters ==
Intercollegiate Knights chartered 67 chapters. As of 2024, only Missouri University of Science and Technology is still active.
