= Jimmy McKinnell Jr. =

Scottish football manager (1902–1995)

James McKinnell Jr. (1902 – 1995) was long-time secretary and manager with Scottish Football League club Queen of the South from Dumfries.

Jimmy Jr, like his father Jimmy McKinnell Sr., was the backbone of the club throughout his years there. He took over as secretary/manager in 1946, from his father, a position he held until 1961 when he gave up the post of manager. However, he carried on the duty of club secretary until 1968, when Queens awarded him a testimonial against Celtic. He was a regular at Palmerston Park until 1995, when he died at the age of 93.

Thus McKinnell's time as Queens manager included:-

- Queens points of note in the late 1940s
- The 1950 Scottish Cup semi final and other creditable Scottish Cup runs
- The 1950s and Queens best era

As well as managing Queens through their most successful era to date McKinnell Jr had some of Queens' greatest names play under him such as Billy Houliston, Roy Henderson, Dougie Sharpe, Jackie Oakes, Jim Patterson, Jimmy Binning, Bobby Black, Ivor Broadis, George Farm, Jimmy Greenock and Ernie Hannigan.
