= Peter Voulkos =

American artist (1924 - 2002)

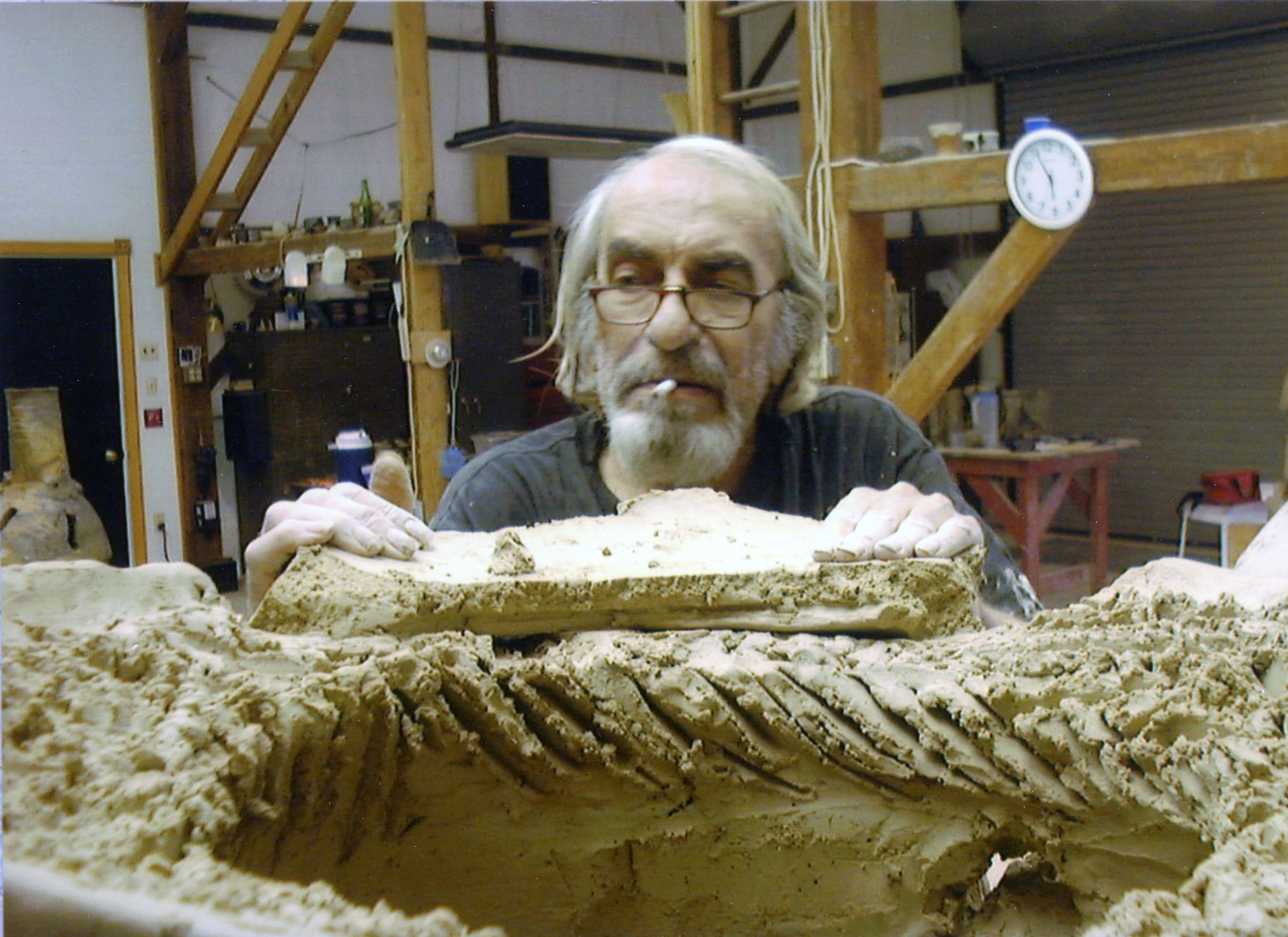
- Peter Voulkos works on a stack, 1996
- Born: Panagiotis Voulkos; January 29, 1924; Bozeman, Montana, US
- Died: February 16, 2002 (aged 78); Bowling Green, Ohio, US
- Education: Montana State University (BFA); California College of the Arts (MFA)
- Known for: Ceramic art, Sculpture
- Movement: Abstract expressionist

Peter Voulkos (born Panagiotis Harry Voulkos; 29 January 1924 – 16 February 2002) was an American artist of Greek descent. He is known for his abstract expressionist ceramic sculptures, which crossed the traditional divide between ceramic crafts and fine art. He established the ceramics department at the Los Angeles County Art Institute and at UC Berkeley.

== Biography ==
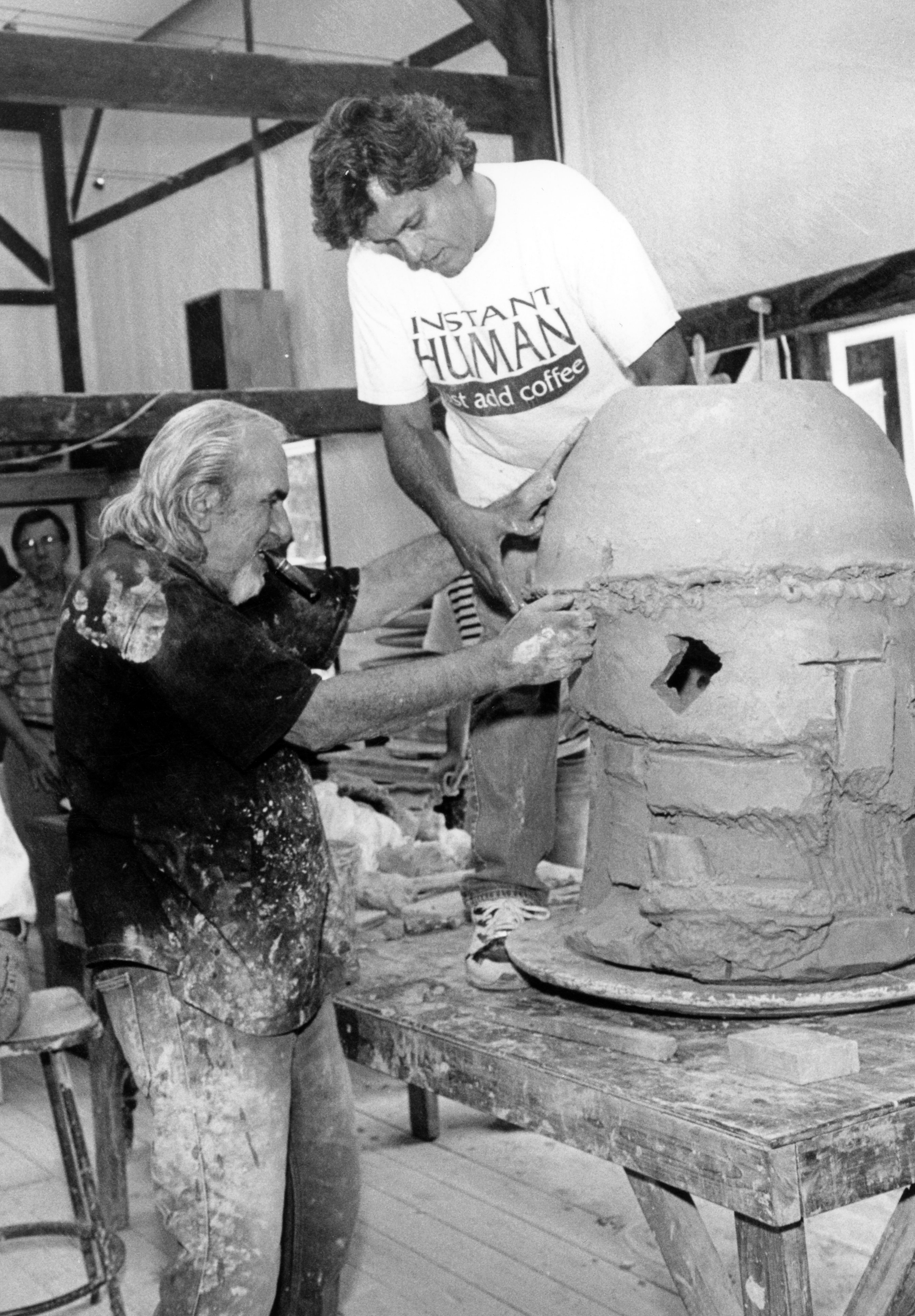
Peter Voulkos and Peter Callas working on a 1998 Stack in Belvidere, NJ.

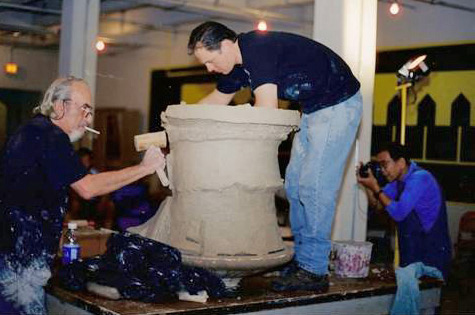
John Balistreri assisting Peter Voulkos.

=== Early life ===
Peter Voulkos was born the third of five children to Greek immigrant parents, Aristovoulos I. Voulkopoulos, anglicized and shortened to Harry (Aris) John Voulkos and Effrosyni (Efrosine) Peter Voulalas.

After high school, he worked as a molder's apprentice at a ship's foundry in Portland. In 1943, Peter Voulkos was drafted into the United States Army during the Second World War, serving as an airplane gunner in the Pacific.

=== Ceramics' specialization ===
Voulkos studied painting and printmaking at Montana State College, in Bozeman (now Montana State University), where he was introduced to ceramics (Frances Senska, who established the ceramics arts program, was his teacher). Ceramics quickly became a passion. His 25 pounds of clay allowed by semester by the school was not enough, but he noticed a source of good quality clay from the tires of the trucks that would stop at the restaurant where he worked part-time.

He earned his MFA in ceramics from California College of the Arts and Crafts, in Oakland. Afterwards, he returned to Bozeman, and began his career in a pottery business with classmate Rudy Autio, producing functional dinnerware.

In 1951 Voulkos and Autio became the first resident artists at the Archie Bray Foundation for the Ceramic Arts, in Helena, Montana. It is from his time as Resident Director (1951–1954) that the lineage of his mature work, later in full bloom during his tenure at the Otis Art Institute in Los Angeles, California, can be traced.

In 1953, Voulkos was invited to teach a summer session ceramics course at Black Mountain College in Asheville, North Carolina. After the summer at Black Mountain, he changed his approach to creating ceramics. The artist eschewed his traditional training and instead of creating smooth, well-thrown glazed vessels he started to work gesturally with raw clay, frequently marring his work with gashes and punctures.

In 1954, after founding the art ceramics department at the Otis College of Art and Design, called the Los Angeles County Art Institute, his work rapidly became abstract and sculptural. In 1959, he presented for the first time his heavy ceramics during the exhibition at the Landau Gallery in Los Angeles. This created a seismic reaction in the ceramics world, both for the grotesquerie of the sculptures' shapes and the genius marriage of arts and craft, and accelerated his transfer to UC Berkeley.

=== UC Berkeley's ceramics department ===
He moved to the University of California, Berkeley, in 1959, where he also founded the ceramics program, which grew into the Department of Design. In the early 1960s, he set up a bronze foundry off-campus, anticipating the metal cast Wurster Hall, and started exhibiting his work at the New York Museum of Modern Art.

He became a full professor there in 1967, and continued to teach until 1985. Among his students were many ceramic artists who became well known in their own right.

In 1984, Voulkos was awarded a Guggenheim Fellowship for Fine Arts.

At a New York auction in 2001, a 1986 sculpture by Peter Voulkos was sold $72,625 to a European museum.

He died of a heart attack on February 16, 2002, after conducting a college ceramics workshop at Bowling Green State University, Ohio, demonstrating his skill to a live audience.

== Work ==
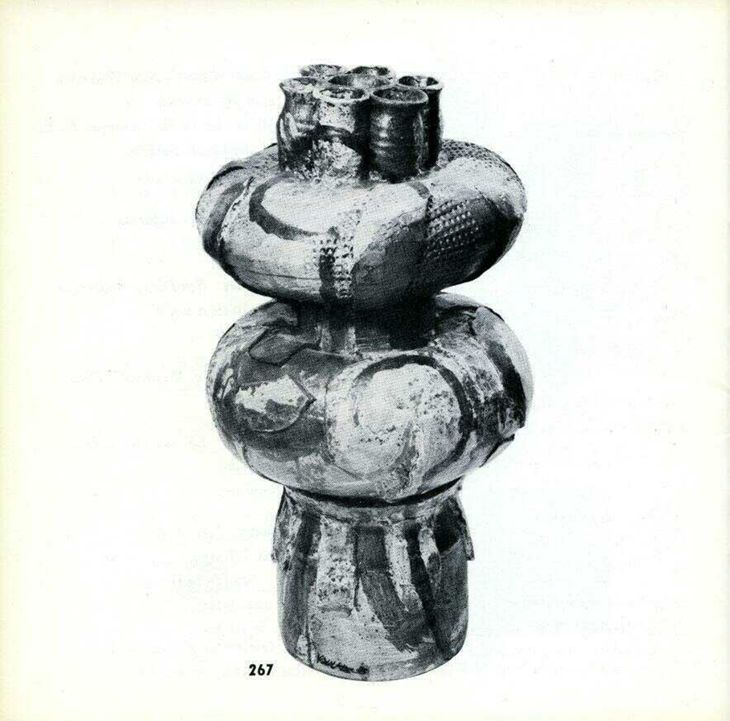
Peter Voulkos, "Vase", stoneware sculpture, Craftsmanship in a Changing World (1956)

=== Description ===
While his early work was fired in electric and gas kilns, later in his career he primarily fired in the anagama kiln of Peter Callas, who had helped to introduce Japanese wood-firing aesthetics in the United States. Peter Voulkos is also among those who raised ceramics to the non-utilitarian, aesthetic sphere. While setting up the ceramics department at UC Berkeley, his students were authorized to make a teapot, "only if it didn't work". Voulkos started this new trend while in Los Angeles in the 1950s, saying, "there was a certain energy around L.A. at the time". He is most commonly identified as an Abstract Expressionist ceramist.

Voulkos's sculptures are known for their visual weight, their freely-formed construction, and their aggressive and energetic decoration. During shaping, he would vigorously tear, pound, and gouge their surfaces. At some points in his career, he cast sculptures in bronze; and in early periods his ceramic works were glazed or painted and/or finished with painted brushstrokes.

Peter Voulkos is also memorable for the live ceramics-sculpting sessions he would lead in front of his students, demonstrating his intense and even unforgiving manner of working with the material, while simultaneously showcasing his refined mastery of the nuances of the craft. His creativity quest sometimes led to the use of commercial dough-mixing machines to mix the clay, and the development of a prototype for an electric potter's wheel.

In 1979 he was introduced to the use of wood firing in anagama kilns by Peter Callas, who became a close collaborator of his for the next 23 years.

=== Sculptures ===
- Black Butte Divide or Black Divide - Butte, 1958, fired clay, Norton Simon Museum
- Hall of justice, 1971, bronze
- Mr. Ishi, 1970, bronze
- Untitled (Stack), 1980, stoneware, exhibited at the Oakland Museum of California

== Public collections ==
- American Museum of Ceramic Art, Pomona, California
- di Rosa, Napa, California
- Honolulu Museum of Art
- Governor Nelson A. Rockefeller Empire State Plaza Art Collection, Albany, New York
- Victoria and Albert Museum, London, England
- Japanese Folk Crafts Museum, Tokyo, Japan
- National Gallery of Victoria, Melbourne, Australia
- Metropolitan Museum of Art
- Museum of Modern Art, New York City, New York
- National Museum of Modern Art, Kyoto
- Oakland Museum of California
- Philadelphia Museum of Art
- Smithsonian Institution, Washington, D.C.
- Stedelijk Museum Amsterdam
- University of Iowa Museum of Art
- Crocker Art Museum, Sacramento, California
- Palm Springs Art Museum, Palm Springs, California
- Detroit Institute of Arts, Detroit, Michigan
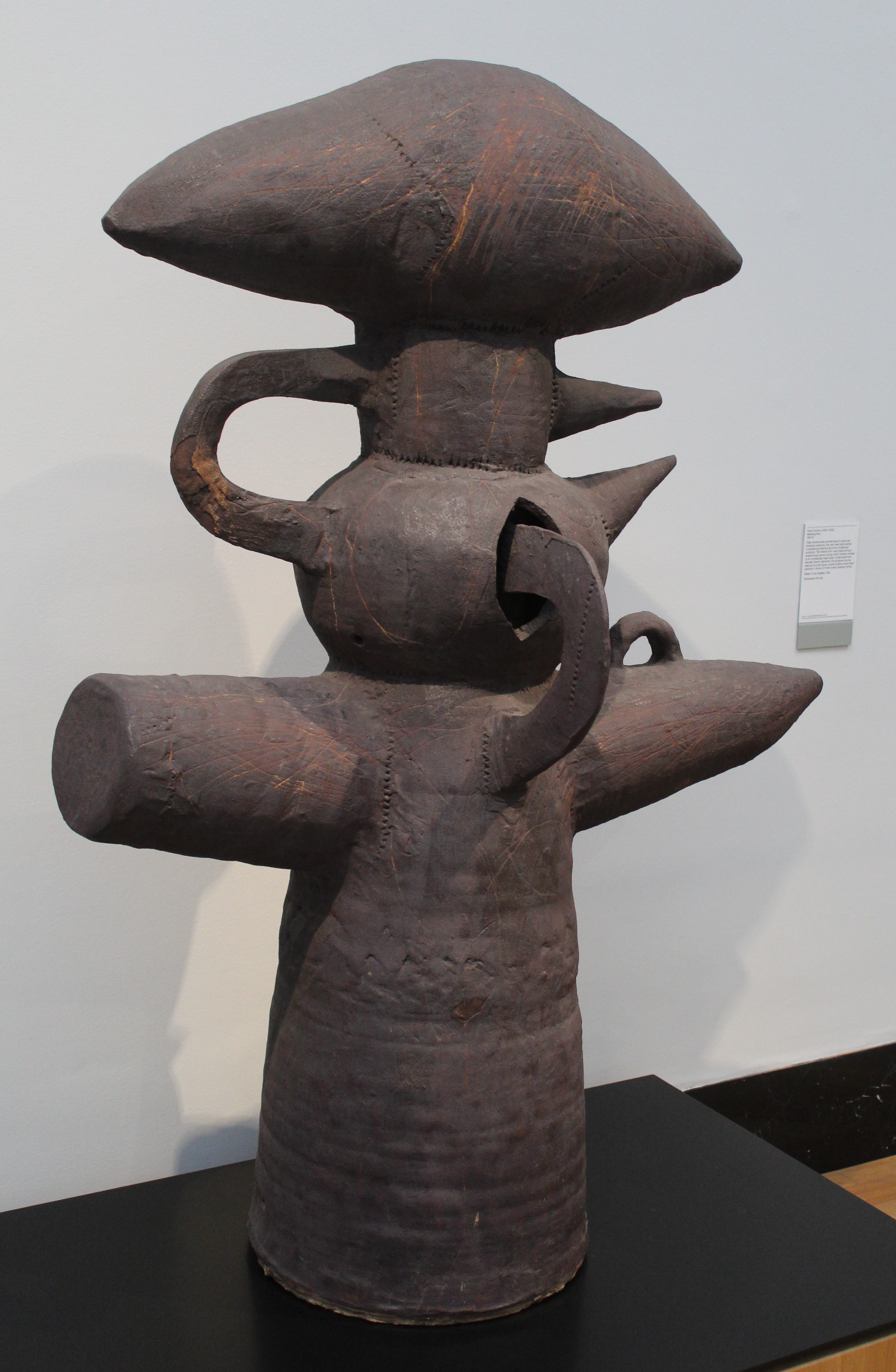
Standing form, 1957–58, Victoria and Albert Museum

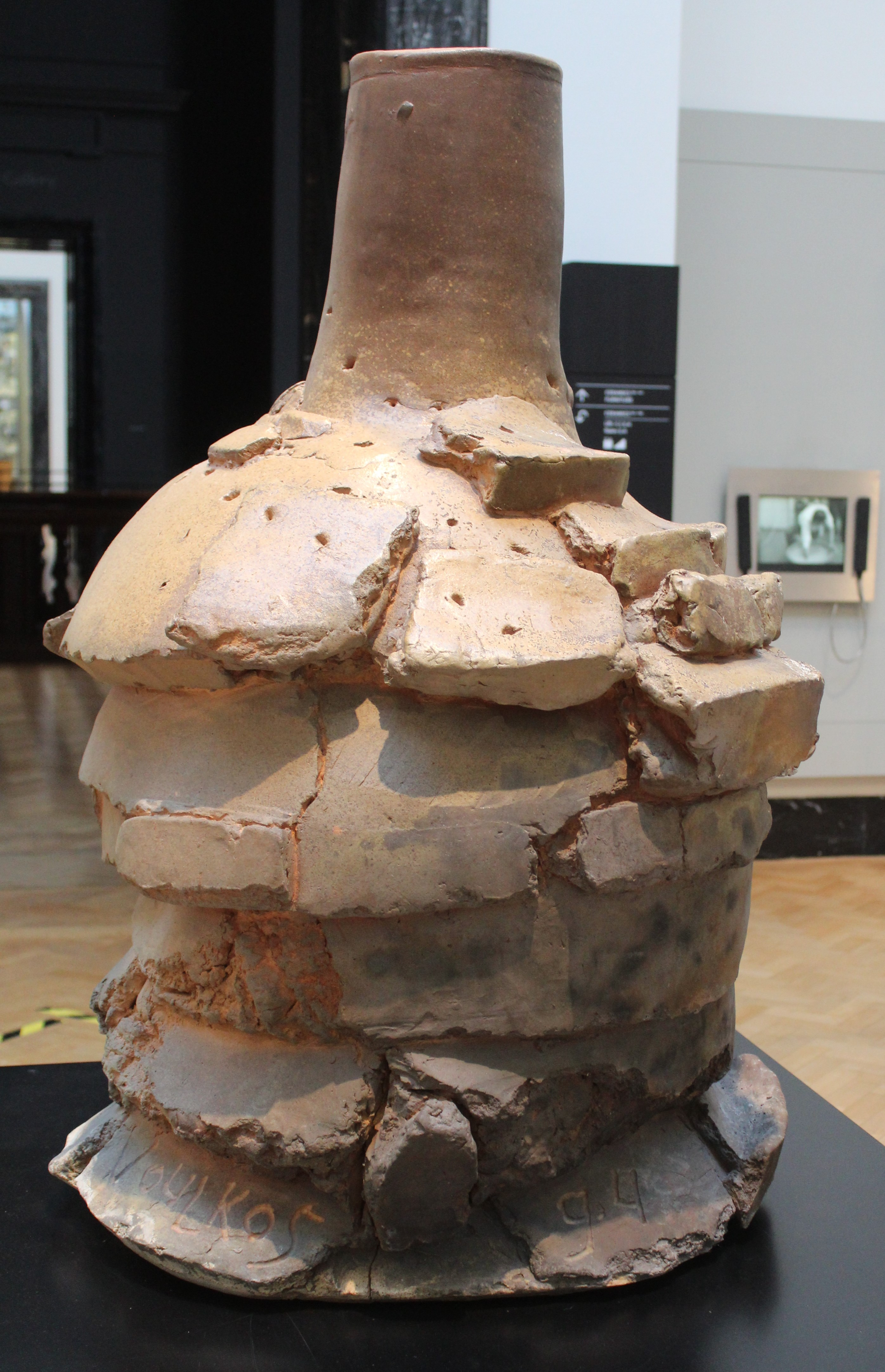
Pinatubo, 1994, Victoria and Albert Museum

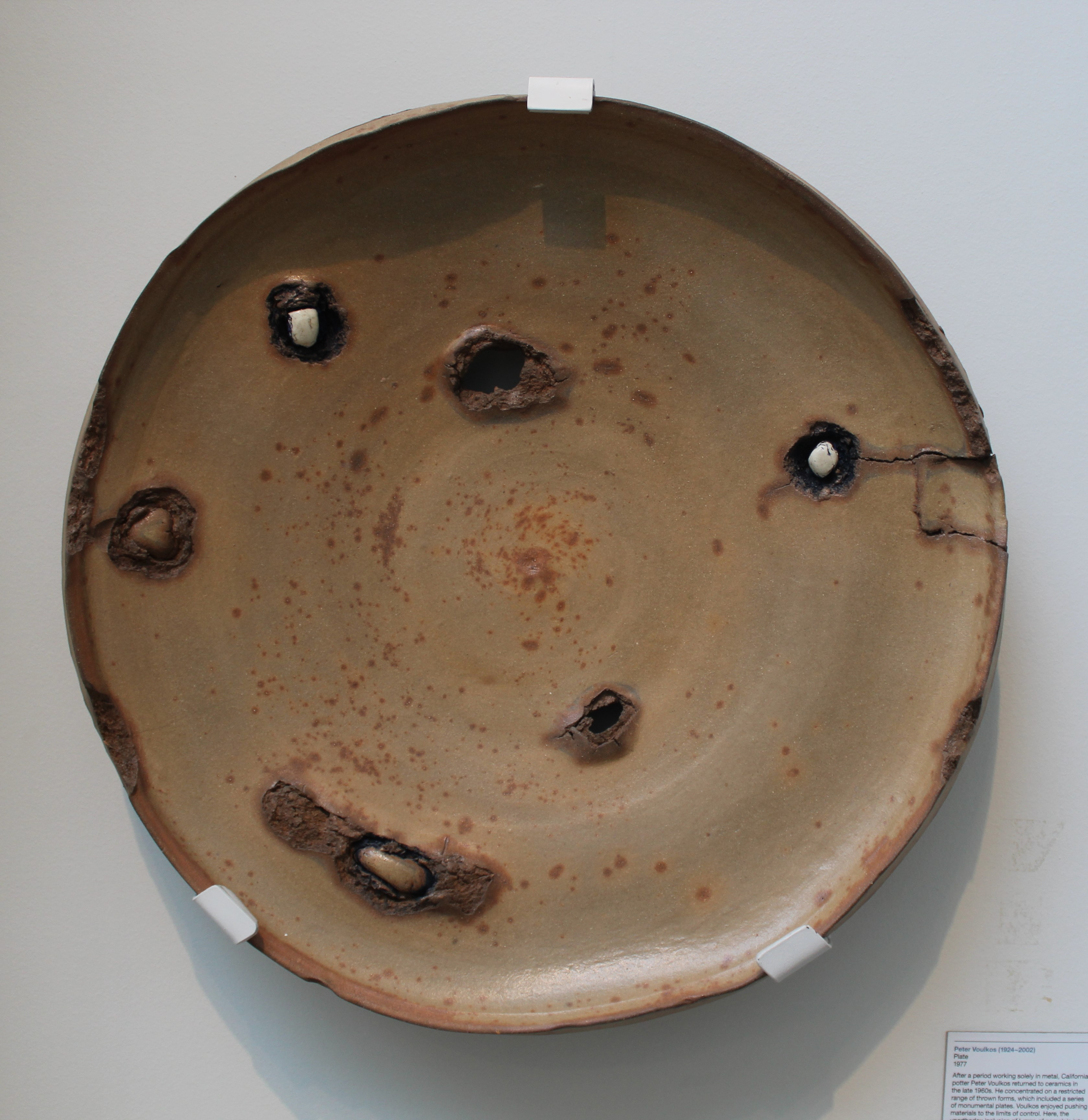
Plate, 1977, Victoria and Albert Museum

== Awards ==
- 1959: Rodin Museum Prize
- 1984: Guggenheim Fellowship
- 1997: Distinguished Artist Award for Lifetime Achievement from the College Art Association
- 2000: International Artist Award from Anderson Ranch Arts Center, Snowmass Village, Colorado

== Personal life ==
Voulkos is survived by his first wife, Margaret Cone, and their daughter, Pier, a polymer clay artist; his wife, Ann, and their son, Aris; and his brother and two sisters.

In the early 1980s, Peter Voulkos went to rehab to deal with alcohol and cocaine addiction.

== See also ==
- American craft
- Ceramics (art)
- Studio pottery
- Paul Soldner
