= Frances Senska =

American art professor

- Born: March 9, 1914; Batanga, Cameroon
- Died: December 25, 2009 (aged 95); Bozeman, Montana, U.S.
- Known for: Ceramics
- Movement: Bauhaus

Frances Maude Senska (March 9, 1914 – December 25, 2009) was an art professor and artist specializing in ceramics who taught at Montana State University – Bozeman from 1946 to 1973. She was known as the "grandmother of ceramics in Montana". During her career, she trained a number of now internationally known ceramic artists.

== Life and career ==
Senska was born in the port city of Batanga in the German Empire colony of Kamerun, (now Batanga, Cameroon). She was the only child of Frank Radcliff Senska and Georgia B. Senska (née Herrald), Presbyterian missionaries. Her father was a physician who founded Sakbayémé Hospital in the town of Sakbayeme in the highlands region of Bassa in Kamerun, her mother was a teacher who worked at the local missionary school. Frances was schooled at home; it took three days to walk to the nearest public school, and her parents felt this was too far away in case she fell ill with a tropical disease.

She came to America for the first time in 1929. She graduated from University High School in Iowa City, Iowa. She earned a Bachelor of Arts and Master of Arts degree from the University of Iowa in 1935 and 1939, respectively. Her undergraduate training was in lithography, and her graduate degree in applied arts (specializing in sculpture.)

She taught art at Grinnell College from 1939 to 1942. In the summer of 1941, she took art classes at the Chouinard Art Institute in Los Angeles, California. But in 1942, her teaching position at Grinnell was eliminated so that the college could hire a physics professor. That summer, she briefly studied ceramics under László Moholy-Nagy at the School of Design (now the IIT Institute of Design) in Chicago. Moholy-Nagy had a strong influence on Senska, influencing not only her ceramic design but her teaching style as well.

She served in the United States Navy from 1942 to 1946 during World War II, where she was trained as a pilot. During her time in the military, she was posted to a base in San Francisco, California. She rose to the rank of lieutenant. She became interested in ceramics after taking a class from Edith Heath, then teaching at the California Labor School. In the summer of 1946, she attended the Cranbrook Academy of Art (now Cranbrook Educational Community), where she studied under Maija Grotell (one of the most important studio potters of mid-20th century America).

She began teaching at Montana State University in Bozeman in 1946. The school's Department of Applied Art hired her to teach ceramics. But she did not, at that time, consider herself a ceramicist. "I started teaching ceramics with the merest little scrap of knowledge. I had had just two quarters of ceramics when I started teaching. I just learned it right along with the class," she later said. Senska decided to build a ceramics program from the ground up. Olga Ross Hannon, the department's head, gave her $300, and she and her first class of students took over a storeroom in the basement of Herrick Hall, purchased foot-driven potter's wheels, and built an electric kiln from scratch. Continuing to train in ceramics, Senska attended a workshop taught by noted French-American ceramic artist Marguerite Wildenhain at the Pond Farm artists' colony near Guerneville, California, in the summer of 1950. Senska later said that she learned her hand technique from Wildenhain. Her students included a number of influential ceramicists, including Rudy Autio and Peter Voulkos. While teaching at Montana State, Senska met fellow art professor Jessie Spaulding Wilber. The two women became lifelong friends and companions. "We had a big thing in common -- childhoods with a lot of moving around," Frances said. "It was a great way to spend a childhood. Other kids had groups of friends and neighborhoods they grew up with, which is nice. On the other hand, it's real nice when you don't really feel you need to be part of a group." Senska retired from teaching in 1973.

Wilber died October 2, 1989. Senska died on Christmas Day 2009 at her home in Bozeman, Montana.

== Legacy, honors, and collections ==
Senska helped to found several important arts organizations. She was one of the founding members of the Montana Institute of the Arts in 1948, served as the organization's Crafts Chair from 1954 to 1956, and was its director from 1961 to 1962. She also helped found the Archie Bray Foundation for the Ceramic Arts in Helena, Montana, in the early 1950s.

Senska received many honors throughout her life. These include:

- 1964 – Elected a Fellow of the Montana Institute of the Arts.
- 1979 – Elected an Honorary Member of the National Council on Education for the Ceramic Arts.
- 1982 – Awarded an Honorary Doctor of Fine Arts from Montana State University.
- 1988 – Elected a Fellow of the American Craft Council.
- 1988 – Recipient of the Montana Governor's Award for Distinguished Achievement in the Arts.
- 2003 – Recipient of the Archie Bray Foundation's Meloy-Stevenson Award of Distinction for Outstanding Service.

Her lithographic prints have been collected by the Brooklyn Museum, the Library of Congress, and the Princeton University Library.

== Bibliography ==
- Senska, Frances. Frances Senska: A Life in Art. Helena: Holter Museum of Art, 2004.
- Johnson, Mark Dean. At Work: The Art of California Labor. San Francisco: California Historical Society Press, 2003.
- Levin, Elaine. The History of American Ceramics, 1607 to the Present: From Pipkins and Bean Pots to Contemporary Forms. New York: H.N. Abrams, 1988.
- McConnell, Gordon and Forbes, Donna. Yellowstone Art Museum: The Montana Collection. Billings, Mont.: Yellowstone Art Museum, 1998.
- Merriam, H.G. The Arts in Montana. Missoula, Mont.: Mountain Press Publishing Co., 1977.
- Newby, Rick. "Art." In The Rocky Mountain Region: The Greenwood Encyclopedia of American Regional Cultures. Rick Newby, ed. Westport, Conn.: Greenwood Press, 2004.
- Ostermann, Matthias. The Ceramic Narrative. London: A&C Black, 2006.
- Slivka, Rose and Tsujimoto, Karen. The Art of Peter Voulkos. New York: Oakland Museum, 1995.
