= Archie Bray Foundation for the Ceramic Arts =

Coordinates: 46°36′51″N 112°04′55″W

The foundation's trademark as of February 2025

The Archie Bray Foundation for the Ceramic Arts (also known as "The Bray") is a public, nonprofit, educational institution located 3 miles from downtown Helena, Montana, United States.

It was founded on the site of the former Western Clay Manufacturing Company in 1951 by brickmaker Archie Bray, a philanthropist and avid patron of the arts. Bray intended it to be "a place to make available for all who are seriously and sincerely interested in any of the branches of the ceramic arts, a fine place to work."

Although Bray died in 1953, his foundation survived the 1960 closure of Western Clay and in 1984 purchased the abandoned brickyard building and kilns. Today the Archie Bray Foundation for the Ceramic Arts is internationally acclaimed and the building is listed on the American National Register of Historic Places as the "Western Clay Manufacturing Company".

The artist residency program is the core of the foundation. Rudy Autio and Peter Voulkos were the first resident artists in 1951. Their professor at Montana State College, Frances Senska, friends with Bray, encouraged them to take advantage of his clay studio. To pay their way, they worked in the brick factory during the day and created their own pottery in the evenings. They built the first building for their new residency program in the summer of '51.
