= Rudy Autio =

American artist (1926–2007)

- Born: Arne Rudolph Autio; October 8, 1926; Butte, Montana
- Died: June 20, 2007 (aged 80); Missoula, Montana
- Education: Montana State University; Washington State University
- Known for: Sculpture

Rudy Autio, born Arne Rudolph Autio, (October 8, 1926 – June 20, 2007) was an American sculptor, best known for his figurative ceramic vessels.

== Biography ==
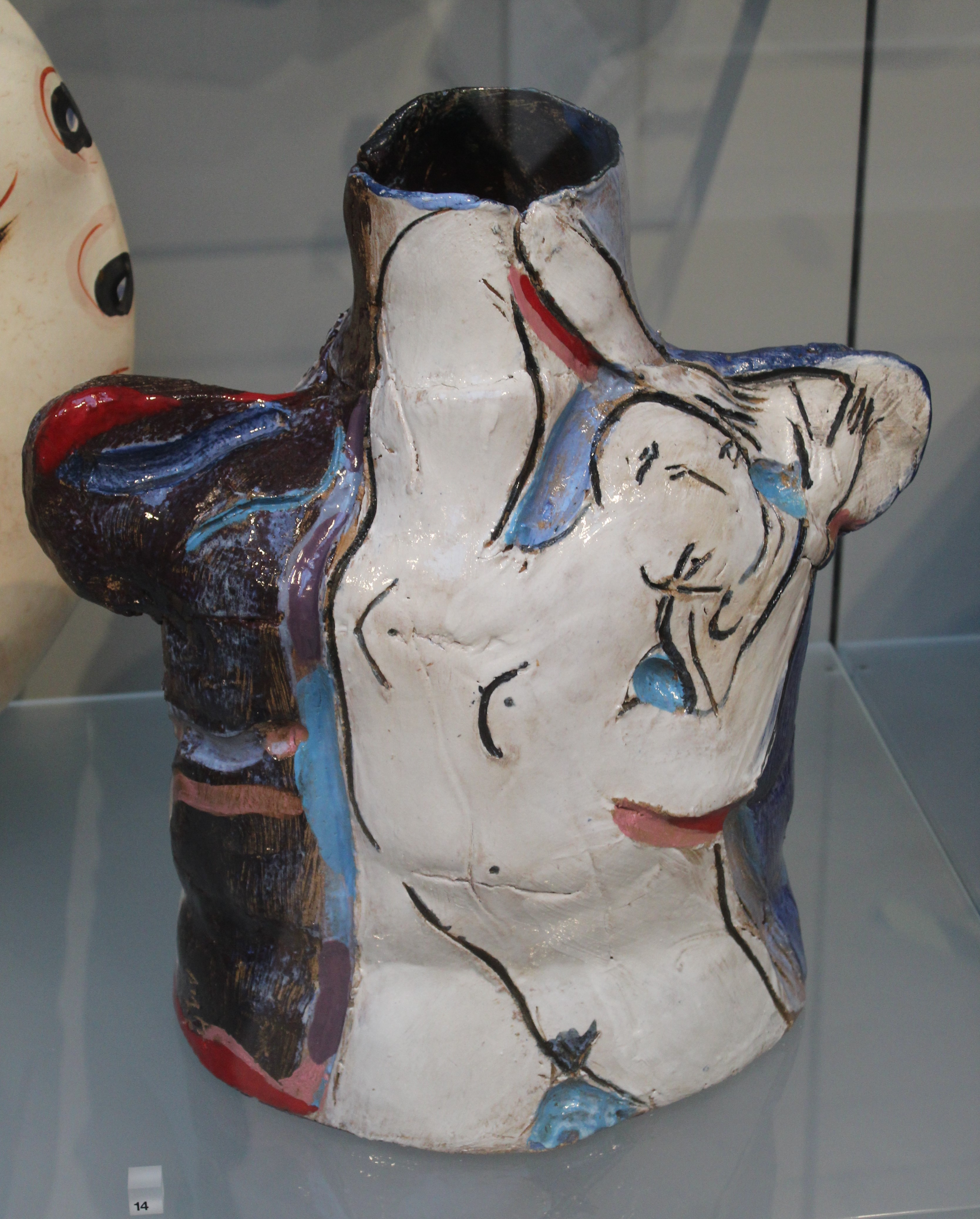
Two Ladies Averting the Angry Swallow, 1983, Victoria and Albert Museum

Autio was born to a family of Finnish immigrants in Butte, Montana. As a child, he first learned to draw by taking evening classes from Works Progress Administration artists working in Butte. He served in the Navy for two years during World War II. After the war ended, he studied art at Montana State University (then Montana State College) in Bozeman, where he first met Peter Voulkos, who became a lifelong friend. Frances Senska taught both of them. Autio earned a Master of Arts degree from Washington State University in Pullman, Washington. In 1952, Autio was a founding resident artist at the Archie Bray Foundation. In 1957, Autio started the ceramics department at the University of Montana, in Missoula. He taught there for twenty-eight years and, until his death, he was retired as Professor Emeritus. Autio died of leukemia in 2007.

Autio's torso-shaped vessels are painted with figures and animals in a free linear style reminiscent of Matisse's drawings. They are found in permanent collections of museums around the world, including the Boston Museum of Fine Arts, the Brooklyn Museum, the Carnegie Museum of Art, the Metropolitan Museum, the Montana Museum of Art and Culture, the Museum of the Rockies, the Nelson-Atkins Museum of Art, the Renwick Gallery of the Smithsonian Institution, the Applied Arts Museum in Helsinki, the Canton Museum of Art, the National Museum in Stockholm, the Portland Art Museum, the Museum of Fine Arts, Houston, the University of Michigan Museum of Art, the Chazen Museum of Art, and the Missoula Art Museum.

== Sources ==
=== Bibliography ===
- Lackey, Louana. Rudy Autio, American Ceramic Society, 2002. ISBN 1-57498-144-7.
