= List of Darlington F.C. players (1–24 appearances) =

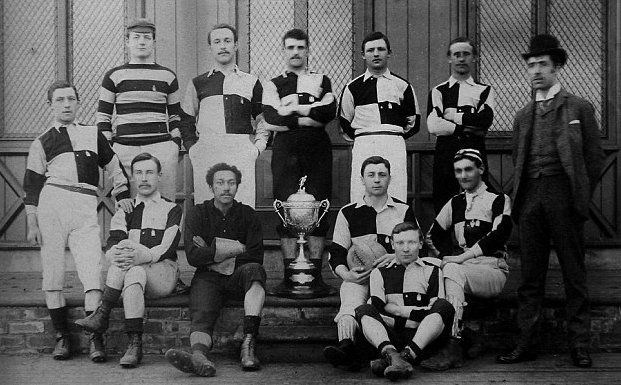
The Darlington F.C. team that won the 1887 Cleveland Challenge Cup. Players: (back row) G. Millar, W. Brooks, Tommy Davison, Tommy Waites, Michael Hope; (standing) Harry Hope; (seated on step) R.T. Stabler, Arthur Wharton, J.H. Smeddle, R.B. Buckton; (seated on ground) J.T. Hutchinson. Wearing suit: Charles Craven.

Darlington Football Club, an English association football club based in Darlington, County Durham, was founded in 1883. They entered the FA Cup for the first time in 1885–86, were founder members of the Northern League in 1889, turned professional in 1908 and joined the North Eastern League, which they won in 1913 and 1921. The latter win preceded election to the Football League as members of its newly formed Third Division North. Runners-up in their first season, Darlington were Northern Section champions three years later, thus winning promotion to the Second Division. Their 15th-place finish in 1926 remains their best League performance, and they were relegated back to the Third Division the following year. After 68 years of continuous membership, they were relegated from the Football League in 1988–89. Having made an immediate return as Conference champions, they remained in the League until 2010, when they again dropped into the Conference. After Darlington failed to exit administration in a manner acceptable to the Football Association, that body treated it as a new club, required it to change its name (to Darlington 1883), and placed its team in the Northern League, the ninth tier of English football, for the 2012–13 season. Five years later, the FA approved the club's request to resume its traditional name.

The club's first team have competed in numerous nationally organised competitions, and all players who have played in between 1 and 24 such matches, either as a member of the starting eleven or as a substitute, are listed below. Each player's details include the duration of his Darlington career, his typical playing position while with the club, and the number of games played and goals scored in domestic league matches and in all senior competitive matches. Where applicable, the list also includes the national team for which the player was selected, and the number of senior international caps he won.

== Introduction ==
More than 800 men played in nationally organised competition for Darlington but never reached the 25-appearance mark. In the early days, the scarcity of nationally organised competitive football meant players could spend many years with the club while making few such outings. Tommy Waites took part in the club's first FA Cup match in 1885 and made his 14th and last such appearance twelve years later. In between, he represented Durham in inter-county matches, was appointed captain of Darlington F.C. in 1890, and in 1896, was recognised as "one of the most respected and reliable members of the team". Tom Rowlandson, who kept goal in six FA Cup matches, was an amateur international for England, captained a touring Corinthian team that helped spread football worldwide and, as a captain in the Yorkshire Regiment, won the Military Cross before being killed in action during the Somme Offensive in 1916.

Eddie Carr, Len Walker and Simon Davey went on to manage the club's first team. Other players took part in significant matches in the history of the club. Bill Edmunds and John Ward played in Darlington's first match in the Football League, a 2–0 win at home to Halifax Town on 27 August 1921. Seven of the thirteen players used in the club's last match in the league, a 2–0 home defeat against Dagenham & Redbridge on 8 May 2010, fall into this category: Nick Liversedge, Andrew Milne, Dan Burn, Gary Dempsey, Nathan Mulligan, Danny Groves and the 16-year-old Jordan Marshall, who had made his senior debut just eleven days earlier.

Numerous players left Darlington to seek opportunities with other teams. Reg Mountford played for ten years in the First Division for Huddersfield Town, appeared in the 1938 FA Cup Final, and managed the Denmark national team that won the bronze medal at the 1948 Olympics. Ray Wood went on to win two League titles with Manchester United and play for England; he survived the Munich air disaster, played another 300 times in the League and managed at both club and international level abroad. The careers of others were winding down: Aston Villa's European Cup-winner Allan Evans's single appearance for Darlington was his last of an 18-year senior career. Others were to make an impression in different sporting fields. Graham Doggart, who played twice for Darlington in 1921–22, became an administrator both in cricket, as a committee member of Sussex CCC and of the MCC, and in football, as chairman of the Football Association. Walter Creasor was a speedway rider in the early days of the sport in Britain.

== Key ==
- The list is ordered first by number of appearances in total, then by number of League appearances, and then if necessary by date of debut.
- Appearances as a substitute are included.
- Statistics are correct up to 21 April 2024, the day after the last fixture of the 2023–24 season. Where a player left the club permanently after this date, his statistics are updated to his date of leaving.

Positions key
Pre-1960s		1960s–	
GK	Goalkeeper		
FB	Full back	DF	Defender
HB	Half back	MF	Midfielder
FW	Forward		

Player
Players marked * were registered for the club as at the date specified above.
Players with name in italics and marked † were on loan from another club for the duration of their Darlington career. The loaning club is noted in the Notes column, and sourced to Neil Brown's Player Database, to the English National Football Archive, or individually.
Position
Playing positions are listed according to the tactical formations that were employed at the time. Thus the change in the names of defensive and midfield positions reflects the tactical evolution that occurred from the 1960s onwards.
Club career
Club career is defined as the first and last calendar years in which the player appeared for the club in any of the competitions listed below.
League appearances and League goals
League appearances and goals comprise those in the Football League (1921–1989 and 1990–2010), the Football Conference (1989–1990 and 2010–2012) and the National League (2016–present). Appearances in the 1939–40 Football League season, abandoned after three matches because of the Second World War, are excluded. (Note: For matches up until the end of 1999–2000: Tweddle (2000), pp. 15, 23–110.; For 2000–01 to 2009–10: "Clubs: Darlington". English National Football Archive. Select season required via dropdown menu, then Season players tab.; For 2010–11 and 2011–12: League: "Club statistics". Darlington F.C. Archived from the original on 17 November 2015. Select season and statistic required via dropdown menus.; For 2010–11 FA Cup and FA Trophy: Match reports linked from "Fixtures 2010/2011 season". Darlington F.C. Archived from the original on 17 November 2015.; For 2011–12 FA Cup and FA Trophy: Stoddart, Craig (10 December 2011). "Quakers' hold on the Trophy is over". The Northern Echo. Darlington. Archived from the original on 20 December 2022.; Walker, Martin (29 October 2011). "Darlington 1 Hinckley United 1". Darlington F.C.; "Hinckley United vs. Darlington 3–0". Soccerway. Perform Group. Archived from the original on 8 July 2023.; For 2013–14 FA Trophy: "Ossett Town v. Darlington". darlofc.co.uk.; "Buxton v. Darlington". darlofc.co.uk.; "Darlington v. Buxton". darlofc.co.uk.; For 2014–15 FA Cup and FA Trophy: "Goals and appearances". Darlington 1883. Archived from the original on 29 May 2015.; For 2015–16 FA Cup and FA Trophy: "Darlington v Hyde United (FA Cup 1Q)". Darlington 1883. Archived from the original on 2 April 2016.; "Darlington v Mossley (FA Trophy)". Darlington 1883. Archived from the original on 2 April 2016.; Stoddart, Craig (14 November 2015). "Disappointment for Darlington with defeat in FA Trophy – and White sent off again". The Northern Echo. Darlington. Archived from the original on 8 July 2023.; For 2016–17: "Goals and appearances 2016–17". Darlington 1883. Archived from the original on 25 May 2017.; For 2017–18: "Goals and appearances Season 2017–18". Darlington F.C. Archived from the original on 2 May 2018.; For 2018–19 onwards, except where sourced below: "Darlington FC: Squad 2018/2019". Soccerway. Perform Group. Select season and competition required via dropdown menu.; For 2018–19 cup appearances: "Statistics: Season 2018–2019". Darlington F.C. Archived from the original on 28 April 2019.; For 2019–20 FA Cup 2nd and 3rd qualifying rounds and FA Trophy qualifying round: Simpson, Ray (21 September 2019). "Quakers win first FA Cup tie in five years". Darlington F.C. Archived from the original on 23 September 2019.; Simpson, Ray (5 October 2019). "Tyrone and Justin put Quakers through". Darlington F.C. Archived from the original on 6 October 2019.; Simpson, Ray (23 November 2019). "Sub Justin scores the winner". Darlington F.C. Archived from the original on 7 January 2021.; For 2020–21 FA Cup 2nd and 3rd qualifying rounds: Simpson, Ray (3 October 2020). "Quakers win penalty shootout to go through in Cup". Darlington F.C. Archived from the original on 8 November 2022.; Simpson, Ray (13 October 2020). "Early Liddle goal sets up Quakers goal spree". Darlington F.C. Archived from the original on 13 April 2023.; For 2021–22 FA Cup 2nd qualifying round: Simpson, Ray (18 September 2021). "Quakers held to a goalless draw in FA Cup". Darlington F.C. Archived from the original on 20 September 2021.; Simpson, Ray (21 September 2021). "Quakers knocked out of Cup by lucky goal". Darlington F.C. Archived from the original on 24 October 2021.; For 2022–23 FA Cup 2nd and 3rd qualifying rounds: "Becky's hat trick puts Quakers into the next round". Darlington F.C. 17 September 2022. Archived from the original on 20 September 2022.; Simpson, Ray (1 October 2022). "Quakers beaten by second half goal at Hyde". Darlington F.C. Archived from the original on 7 October 2022.; For 2023–24 FA Cup 2nd and 3rd qualifying rounds: "Emirates FA Cup Second Qualifying Round – Darlington 3–1 Workington AFC". Football Web Pages. Archived from the original on 11 October 2023.; Simpson, Ray (30 September 2023). "Scarborough go through with late penalty". Darlington F.C. Archived from the original on 11 October 2023.)
Total appearances and Total goals
Total appearances and goals comprise those in the Football League (including play-offs), Football Conference, National League, FA Cup, Football League Third Division North Cup, Football League Cup, Associate Members' Cup/Football League Trophy, FA Trophy and Conference League Cup. Matches in wartime competitions are excluded.
International selection
Countries are listed only for players who have been selected for international football. Only the highest level of international competition is given, except where a player competed for more than one country, in which case the highest level reached for each country is shown.

== Players with 1 to 24 appearances ==
Table of players, including playing position, club statistics and international selection
Player	Pos	Club career	League		Total		International selection	Refs
Player	Pos	Club career	Apps	Goals	Apps	Goals	International selection	Refs
Ken Smith	FW	1959–1960	24	7	24	7	—	
Gary Dempsey	MF	2010	24	1	24	1	Republic of Ireland youth	
Charlie Slade	HB	1925–1927	23	0	24	0	—	
Frank McMahon	MF	1973–1974	23	1	24	1	—	
Russell Kelly	MF	1996–1997	23	2	24	2	Republic of Ireland youth	
Mor Diop	FW	2009–2010	23	2	24	3	—	
Danny Ellis	DF	2021–2022	23	1	24	1	—	
Walter Holmes	FB	1928–1929	22	0	24	0	—	
Alex Jeannin	DF	2001	22	0	24	2	—	
Liam Hughes	MF	2018–2019	22	1	24	1	—	
Les Massie	FW	1966–1967	20	2	24	2	—	
John McFarlane	FW	1935–1936	18	1	24	1	—	
Billy Dunlop	FW	1954–1955	18	2	24	3	—	
Dale Anderson	FW	1987–1990	18	0	24	1	—	
James McGiffen	FW	1927–1929	23	4	23	4	—	
Tommy Hall	HB	1929–1931	23	1	23	1	—	
Jim Barron	GK	1946–1947	23	0	23	0	—	
Charlie Wayman	FW	1956–1957	23	14	23	1	—	
George Smith	DF	2021–2022	21	1	23	1	—	
John Wilson	MF	1971–1973	20	1	23	1	—	
Mike Angus	MF	1984–1985	18	7	23	7	—	
Kalu N'Goma	MF	2006–2007	18	1	23	2	—	
David Mills	FW	1986	17	2	23	2	England B	
Aaron Travis	FW	1914–1922	11	6	23	13	—	
Jack Hill	FW	1929–1931	22	14	22	14	—	
Stuart Giddings	DF	2009–2010	22	0	22	0	England U19	
George Hunter	GK	1961–1962	20	0	22	0	—	
Geoff Martin	MF	1961–1962	20	6	22	6	—	
Terry Melling	FW	1969	20	6	22	6	—	
Paddy Lowrey	MF	1975–1976	20	2	22	2	English schools	
Gordon Reed	FW	1935–1936	18	7	22	10	—	
Adam Griffin	DF	2008–2009	17	0	22	0	—	
Cecil Harris	GK	1930	21	0	21	0	—	
George Hall	HB / FW	1930–1933	21	4	21	4	—	
Sam Shields	FW	1952–1953	21	2	21	2	—	
Fred Leeder	FB	1958–1960	21	0	21	0	—	
Nick Cusack	MF / FW	1992	21	6	21	6	—	
Evan Horwood †	DF	2006–2007	20	0	21	0	—	(Note: Sheffield United)
Thompson Kirkham	FW	1923–1924	19	1	21	1	—	
David Smyth	FW	1937–1938	19	6	21	7	—	
Carl Taylor	MF	1962–1963	19	1	21	1	—	
John Leadbitter	DF	1972–1973	19	0	21	0	—	
Tom Burnett	FB	1936–1938	16	0	21	0	—	
David Dowson	FW	2009; 2013–2015	10	1	21	4	—	(Note: Sunderland)
Raymond O'Connor	HB	1938–1939	19	0	20	1	—	
Jimmy Potter	HB	1963–1964	19	1	20	1	—	
Gareth Waite	MF	2010	19	1	20	1	—	
Jonny Ngandu	MF	2023–2024	19	2	20	2	—	
Harold Crockford	FW	1926–1927	18	8	20	8	—	
Ronnie Burbeck	FW	1963–1964	18	1	20	1	England youth	
Steve Thomas	MF	2004–2006	18	0	20	0	Wales U21	
Kevin Gall	FW	2008; 2009	18	2	20	2	Wales U21	(Note: Carlisle United)
James Walshaw	FW	2011	18	3	20	3	—	
Dave Wintersgill	MF	1986–1987	17	1	20	1	—	
Franz Resch	DF	1997–1998	17	1	20	1	Austria	
Scott Wiseman	DF	2007–2008	17	0	20	0	Gibraltar; England U20	
Adam Mitchell	MF	2014–2016	11	1	20	2	—	
Bill Gardner	FW	1927–1928	19	16	19	16	England amateur	
Dick Renwick †	DF	1974	19	0	19	0	—	(Note: Rochdale)
Craig Hignett	MF	2004–2005	19	9	19	9	—	
Shane Redmond †	GK	2010	19	0	19	0	Republic of Ireland U21	(Note: Nottingham Forest)
Scott Barrow †	DF	2024	19	0	19	0	Wales semi-pro	(Note: York City)
David Young	DF	1982–1983	18	0	19	0	—	
John Blythe	DF	1945–1949	17	0	19	0	—	
Keith Hird	GK	1963–1964	17	0	19	0	—	
Keith Smith	FW	1966–1967	17	2	19	2	—	
Paul Mattison	MF	1994–1996	17	0	19	0	—	
Martin Carruthers	FW	1999	17	2	19	2	—	
John Hope	GK	1965–1968	14	0	19	0	—	
Colin Ross	MF	1983–1984	14	0	19	0	—	
Dan Burn	DF	2009–2011	14	0	19	0	—	
David Taylor	FB	1910–1911; 1919–1921	0	0	19	0	—	
John Ward	GK	1921–1924	18	0	18	0	—	
John Kelly	FW	1928–1929	18	1	18	1	—	
Jim Nickalls	DF	1955	18	0	18	0	—	
Kevin Barry	GK	1980	18	0	18	0	—	
Romal Palmer †	MF	2018–2019	18	0	18	0	—	(Note: Barnsley)
Matty Cornish *	MF	2024–present	18	6	18	6	—	
Cedric Main *	FW	2024–present	18	6	18	6	—	
Sam Rowbotham	HB	1934–1935	17	1	18	1	—	
Billy Coyle	HB	1949–1950	17	0	18	0	—	
Danny Groves	MF	2009–2010	17	0	18	0	—	
Cliff Wright	MF	1970	16	4	18	4	—	
Peter Bainbridge	DF	1979	16	0	18	0	—	
Barry Dunn	MF	1982	16	4	18	4	—	
Andy Oakes	GK	2007–2009	16	0	18	0	—	
George Switzer	DF	1993–1994	14	0	18	0	—	
Kevin Caizley	MF	1988–1989	12	1	18	1	—	
Alec Fraser	FW / HB	1909–1912	0	0	18	7	—	
Jimmy Donnelly	FW	1910–1913	0	0	18	8	—	
Jon Wright	HB	1947–1948	17	0	17	0	—	
Don Cowan	GK	1952–1954	17	0	17	0	—	
Charlie Nicklas	FW	1953–1954	17	6	17	6	—	
Danny Carlton †	FW	2009	17	4	17	4	England C	
Jordan Pickford †	GK	2012	17	0	17	0	England	
Jonny Burn	DF	2018	17	0	17	0	—	
Ken Brandon	FW	1958–1959	16	1	17	1	—	
Daniel Dodds †	DF	2022	14	1	17	1	—	(Note: Middlesbrough)
Robert Lowes	FW	1928–1929	13	3	17	5	—	
Kenny Mitchell	DF	1981	13	1	17	1	—	
Nathan Modest †	FW	2011	13	0	17	1	—	(Note: Sheffield Wednesday)
Jim Parmley	FW	1936–1937	12	4	17	7	—	
Eddie Hanlon	HB	1910–1911; 1914–1919	0	0	17	2	—	
Thomas Tolson	FW / FB	1894–1902	0	0	17	4	—	
Jimmy Lyske	FB	1958–1959	16	0	16	0	Northern Ireland youth	
Peter Walters †	GK	1972	16	0	16	0	—	(Note: Hull City)
Chris Jones †	FW	1978	16	3	16	3	—	(Note: Doncaster Rovers)
Teuvo Moilanen †	GK	1997	16	0	16	0	Finland	(Note: Preston North End)
Nathan Mulligan	MF	2009–2010	16	1	16	1	—	
Aynsley Pears †	GK	2018	16	0	16	0	—	
Nathan Newall †	DF	2023	16	1	16	1	—	
Gary Innes	FW	1996–1997	15	0	16	0	England youth	
Clint Marcelle	MF	2001	15	0	16	0	Trinidad and Tobago	
Dale Hopson	MF	2011–2012	15	2	16	2	—	
Greg Mills	DF	2017–2018	15	1	16	1	—	
Tom Penn	FB	1927–1928	14	0	16	0	—	
Jim Brown	HB	1961–1963	14	0	16	0	—	
John Daglish	HB	1930–1933	14	1	16	1	—	
Kenny Lowe	MF	1997	14	0	16	0	England C	
Gaetano Giallanza	FW	2006–2007	14	3	16	4	—	
George Smith	HB	1933–1934	13	1	16	2	—	
Peter Kirkham	MF	1993–1995	13	0	16	0	—	
Matt Carmichael	FW	1996	13	2	16	2	—	
Steve Carney	DF	1985–1986	12	0	16	0	—	
Osagi Bascome	MF	2019	11	0	16	0	Bermuda (4)	
Lawrence Golightly	FB	1919–1924	7	0	16	0	England amateur	
Nicky Hunt	DF	2020–2021	6	0	16	0	England U21	
Thomas H. McIntosh	HB	1898–1905	0	0	16	0	—	
Joe Hisbent	FB / HB	1909–1912	0	0	16	0	—	
Ernest Bannister	HB	1910–1912	0	0	16	1	—	
William Cook	FW	1932–1933	15	2	15	2	—	
Jim McGhee	FW	1952–1953	15	4	15	4	—	
Tommy Lumley	FW	1956–1957	15	3	15	3	—	
Billy Neale	HB	1957	15	0	15	0	—	
Harry Darbyshire	FW	1959	15	2	15	2	—	
Johnny Downie	FW	1959	15	2	15	2	—	
Stan Storton	FB	1964	15	0	15	0	—	
Neil Teggart †	FW	2004	15	0	15	0	Northern Ireland U21	
Jason St Juste	MF	2004–2005	15	2	15	2	Saint Kitts and Nevis	
Simon Madden	DF	2010	15	0	15	0	Republic of Ireland U21	
Chris Atkinson †	MF	2011	15	0	15	0	—	(Note: Huddersfield Town)
Jack Vickers	HB	1929	14	0	15	0	—	
Don Ashman	FB	1935	14	0	15	0	—	
Tony Lee	MF	1968–1969	14	1	15	1	—	
Mark Rhodes †	MF	1982–1983	14	0	15	0	—	(Note: Rotherham United)
Irvine Boocock	FB	1922	13	0	15	0	—	
Ernie Young	FW	1922–1923	13	4	15	6	—	
Richard Offiong †	FW	2002–2003; 2010	13	2	15	4	England U20	(Note: Newcastle United)
Mark Bower	DF	2009–2010	13	0	15	0	—	
Nick Liversedge	GK	2009–2010	13	0	15	0	—	
Trevor Brissett	DF	1982	12	0	15	0	—	
David Atkinson	DF	2019–2020	12	0	15	0	England U17	
Michael Brough	MF	2010–2011	11	0	15	1	Wales U21	
Tony McMahon	DF	2020–2021	7	0	15	0	England U19	
Tom Hutchinson	FW	1885–1894	0	0	15	8	—	
Ronald Brebner	GK	1906–1907; 1910–1911	0	0	15	0	England amateur	
Geordie Henderson	FW	1927	14	6	14	6	—	
Bill Harvey	FW	1938–1939	14	7	14	7	—	
Bob Sharpe	FB	1952–1953	14	0	14	0	—	
Graeme Hedley †	MF	1979	14	1	14	1	—	
Paul Dobson	FW	1992–1993	14	2	14	2	—	
Andy Cooke †	FW	2006	14	3	14	3	—	(Note: Bradford City)
Adam Quinn	DF	2011	14	0	14	0	—	
Will Smith †	DF	2018–2019	14	1	14	1	—	
Hayden Lindley	MF	2023–2024	14	0	14	0	—	
Matty Young †	GK	2024	14	0	14	0	England U19	
Harry Hall	FW	1923	13	1	14	1	—	
Ben Parker †	DF	2008	13	0	14	0	England U19	(Note: Leeds United)
Kevin Austin	DF	2010	13	0	14	1	Trinidad and Tobago	
Reg Mountford	FB	1928–1929	12	3	14	3	—	
Reg Hill	HB	1937	12	0	14	0	—	
Ray Wood	GK	1949	12	0	14	0	England	
James Gray	FW	2011–2012	11	0	14	0	Northern Ireland U21	
Roger Davies	FW	1983–1984	10	1	14	2	England U23	
Phil Linacre	FW	1991	10	3	14	4	—	
Dan Maguire	FW	2020–2021	9	3	14	3	England C	
Érico Sousa	MF	2020–2021	9	4	14	7	Portugal U19	
Ron Harrison	FW	1945–1947	8	3	14	7	—	
Johnny Saltmer	GK	2020–2021	7	0	14	0	—	
Tommy Waites	HB	1885–1892; 1896–1897	0	0	14	1	—	
J. Callaghan	FW / HB	1894–1902	0	0	14	5	—	
William Butler	FW	1923	13	1	13	1	—	
Tim Maloney	FW	1928–1929	13	4	13	4	—	
Ken Williamson	FW	1952–1953	13	3	13	3	—	
Ray Snowball	GK	1964–1966	13	0	13	0	—	
Dave Crampton	GK	1969–1970	13	0	13	0	—	
Billy Coulson †	MF	1976	13	1	13	1	—	(Note: Southend United)
John Gidman	DF	1988	13	1	13	1	England	
David Lucas †	GK	1995–1996; 1996	13	0	13	0	England U20	
Andrew Milne †	DF	2009–2010	13	0	13	0	Scotland U19	
Danny Lambert	MF	2012	13	1	13	1	—	
Keith Finch	GK	1999–2002	12	0	13	0	—	
Ted Lowery	FW	1936–1937	11	3	13	4	—	
Ray Finnigan	DF	1966–1968	11	0	13	0	—	
Tony McAndrew	DF	1988–1989	11	0	13	0	—	
Gary Hamilton †	MF	1991	11	2	13	2	Scotland youth	
Billy Whelan	FB / HB	1933–1934	10	0	13	0	—	
Liam Connell †	GK	2019–2020	9	0	13	0	—	(Note: South Shields)
D. Campbell	HB	1889–1895	0	0	13	0	—	
Charlie Dixon	FB	1912–1915	0	0	13	0	—	
Bill Ellerington	HB	1912–1915	0	0	13	0	—	
A. Newton	FB	1912–1915	0	0	13	1	—	
John Whitbourn	GK	1912–1915	0	0	13	0	—	
Bob Bolam	FW	1922–1923	12	2	12	2	—	
John Edgar	FW	1955–1956	12	0	12	0	—	
Brian Glendinning	FW	1955–1956	12	2	12	2	—	
Jim Cannon	FW	1956	12	1	12	1	—	
Dave Clarke †	GK	1970	12	0	12	0	England semi-pro	
Paul Dyson	DF	1989	12	3	12	3	England U21	
Bobby Petta	MF	2005	12	1	12	1	—	
Ben Purkiss	DF	2011	12	0	12	0	—	
Barry Hawkes	FW	1960–1961	11	3	12	3	—	
Jeff Wilson	DF	1983–1984	11	0	12	0	—	
Rob Dewhurst †	DF	1991–1992	11	1	12	1	—	(Note: Blackburn Rovers)
Wilson Kneeshaw	FW	2015; 2019	11	1	12	1	—	
Ed Wilczynski	GK	2017	11	0	12	0	—	
Mick Connaboy	HB	1933–1934	10	0	12	0	—	
Chris Porter	GK	2001–2003	10	0	12	0	—	
David Knight	GK	2005–2006; 2009	10	0	12	0	England U19	
Lee Turnbull	MF	1997–1998	9	0	12	0	—	
Adam Marsh	FW	2000–2001	8	0	12	1	—	
Matty Plummer	DF	2009	8	0	12	0	—	
Amar Purewal	FW	2013–2016	6	1	12	5	—	
John Bowes	FW / FB	1894–1895; 1897–1902	0	0	12	3	—	
Joe Johnson	HB	1894–1900	0	0	12	0	—	
Joe Watson	FB	1929	11	0	11	0	—	
Mike Westgarth	FW	1931–1932	11	1	11	1	—	
Joseph Sewell	FW	1933	11	0	11	0	—	
Ron Mailer	FW	1955	11	2	11	2	—	
Owen Simpson	DF	1971	11	0	11	0	—	
Simon Davey †	MF	1997	11	0	11	0	—	
Drewe Broughton	FW	2012	11	1	11	1	—	
Jake Turner †	GK	2019	11	0	11	0	England U19	(Note: Bolton Wanderers)
Jack Rand	FW	1929–1930	10	7	11	7	—	
Joe Craddock	FW	1931–1932	10	2	11	2	—	
Jimmy Loughlin	FW	1933–1934	10	5	11	5	—	
John Duffy	HB	1963–1964	10	1	11	1	—	
John Cowan	MF	1975–1976	10	0	11	0	Northern Ireland	
Brian Laws	DF	1996–1997	10	0	11	0	England B	
Joe Clarke	MF	2010	10	1	11	1	—	
Scott Harrison	DF	2011–2012	10	0	11	0	—	
Mitchell Glover	FW	2017–2019	10	0	11	0	—	
Will McGowan †	MF	2024	10	2	11	2	—	(Note: Gateshead)
Przemysław Kazimierczak	GK	2008–2009	9	0	11	0	—	
Corey Barnes	MF	2009	9	0	11	0	—	
John Hellawell	FW	1966	8	1	11	3	—	
David McMahon †	FW	2000–2001	8	1	11	2	Republic of Ireland U18	
Adam Proudlock	FW	2008	8	0	11	0	England youth	
Bobby Bell	FW	1900–1903	0	0	11	1	—	
G. King	FB	1903–1907	0	0	11	0	—	
Bobby Kerr	FW	1952–1953	10	2	10	2	—	
Paul Hutchinson	DF	1971–1973	10	0	10	0	—	
Len Walker	DF	1976–1978	10	0	10	0	—	
John Reed †	MF	1993	10	2	10	2	—	
Steve McMahon	FW	1996	10	1	10	1	—	
Olivier Bernard †	DF	2001	10	2	10	2	—	
Jimmy Corbett †	MF	2003	10	2	10	2	—	
Patrick Deane	FW	2010	10	0	10	0	—	
Cameron Thompson †	FW	2022	10	1	10	1	—	
Baden Powell	FW	1950–1953	9	0	10	0	—	
Keith Webster	MF	1966–1967	9	0	10	0	—	
Stewart McPhee	MF	1986–1987	9	1	10	1	—	
Bertrand Bossu	GK	2005	9	0	10	0	—	
Lee Jones	GK	2007	9	0	10	0	—	
Alex Rainnie	HB	1921–1922	8	0	10	0	—	
Bill Glasper	HB / FW	1936–1937	8	0	10	1	—	
Mark Taylor †	DF	1994	8	0	10	0	—	
Tom Kaak	FW	2000	8	2	10	2	—	
Thomas Butler †	MF	2000	8	0	10	0	Republic of Ireland	
Paul Crichton †	GK	1987; 1987	8	0	10	0	—	
Lee Thorpe	FW	2009	8	0	10	1	—	
Garry Williamson	MF	2000–2001	6	0	10	0	—	
H. Henderson	GK	1893–1900	0	0	10	0	—	
Ben Cansick	FW	1896–1900	0	0	10	5	—	
Kidd	GK	1901–1904	0	0	10	0	—	
Jack Dodds	FW	1910–1911	0	0	10	3	—	
Sam White	FW	1929–1930	9	2	9	2	—	
Jim Harker	FW	1932–1933	9	3	9	3	—	
Terry Stoddart	HB	1954–1955	9	0	9	0	—	
Ian Hopkinson	FW	1972–1973	9	1	9	1	—	
Barry Stell	MF	1980–1981	9	0	9	0	—	
Danny Graham †	FW	2004	9	2	9	2	England U20	
Guy Bates	FW	2006	9	1	9	1	—	
Kyle Lafferty †	FW	2006	9	3	9	3	Northern Ireland	
Jemal Johnson †	FW	2006	9	3	9	3	—	
Haydn Hollis †	DF	2012	9	1	9	1	—	(Note: Notts County)
Paul Johnson †	DF	2012	9	0	9	0	—	(Note: Hartlepool United)
Williams Kokolo †	DF	2018–2019	9	0	9	0	—	
Niall Brookwell †	DF	2023	9	0	9	0	—	
Steve Ingle	DF	1973	8	0	9	0	—	
Phil Stamp	MF	2005–2006	8	1	9	1	England U18	
Jordan Mustoe	DF	2023	8	0	9	0	—	
Akwasi Asante	FW	2023–2024	8	0	9	0	—	
Bob Thyne	DF	1945–1946	7	0	9	0	Scotland wartime	
John Leah	FW	1998–1999	7	1	9	1	—	
Bill Hopper	FW	1965	6	0	9	1	—	
Steve Walklate	FB	2000	6	0	9	0	—	
Adam Nowakowski	MF	2015–2016	6	0	9	1	—	
Edward Auld	GK	1888–1892	0	0	9	0	—	
Frank Norris	FB	1892–1897	0	0	9	0	—	
W. Todd	FB	1896–1900	0	0	9	0	—	
Sherwood	FB	1903–1904; 1907–1908	0	0	9	0	—	
Bill Edmunds	FW	1921–1922	8	6	8	6	—	
Albert Watson	HB	1923	8	0	8	0	—	
Alex Bosomworth	FW	1924–1926	8	0	8	0	—	
Arthur Sharp	FW	1936–1937	8	0	8	0	—	
John Franklin	FW	1947–1948	8	3	8	3	—	
Joe Riley	FW	1949	8	2	8	2	—	
Ken Rickards	FW	1950	8	0	8	0	—	
Alex Greenwood	FB	1955–1956	8	0	8	0	—	
John Tennant	GK	1957	8	0	8	0	—	
Barry Siddall †	GK	1980	8	0	8	0	England youth	
Stewart Ferebee	FW	1987	8	0	8	0	—	
Rory Prendergast †	MF	2007	8	0	8	0	—	
Mark Phillips †	DF	2007	8	0	8	0	—	(Note: Millwall)
Jonathan Sánchez Muñoz	DF	2011	8	1	8	1	—	
Graeme Armstrong	MF	2014–2015	8	2	8	2	—	
Jack Vaulks	DF	2017–2018	8	0	8	0	—	
Tom Scott	FW	1924–1925	7	3	8	3	—	
Billy Cowan	FW	1930–1931	7	1	8	1	Scotland	
Ron Watson	HB	1933–1934	7	0	8	0	—	
John Green	HB	1936–1937	7	0	8	0	—	
Frank Gower	GK	1938–1939	7	0	8	0	—	
Micky Bloor	DF	1973–1974	7	0	8	0	—	
Tommy Paterson	FW	1978–1979	7	2	8	2	—	
Mark Miller	MF	1984	7	1	8	1	—	
Paul Beavers	FW	2000–2001	7	1	8	1	—	
Craig Nelthorpe †	MF	2008	7	0	8	0	—	
Simon Thomas †	FW	2009	7	1	8	1	—	(Note: Crystal Palace)
James Collins †	FW	2009	7	2	8	2	Republic of Ireland U21	(Note: Aston Villa)
Phil Gray	DF	2011–2012	7	0	8	0	—	
Graham Clark	MF	1979	6	0	8	0	Scotland schools	
John Huntley	DF	1985–1986	6	0	8	0	—	
Pedro Paulo	MF	1995	6	0	8	0	—	
Alan Gray	DF	1997	6	0	8	0	—	
Carl Pepper	DF	1998–1999	6	0	8	0	—	
Fabien Bossy	MF	2003	6	0	8	0	—	
Mark McLeod	MF	2006	6	0	8	0	—	
Paul Willis	MF	1989–1990	5	1	8	2	—	
Mark Angel	MF	2000	5	0	8	1	England semi-pro	
Kevin Kyle †	FW	2000	5	1	8	2	Scotland	
Theo Hudson	MF	2020	5	0	8	0	England U16	
George Bird	HB	1892–1897	0	0	8	0	—	
H. Buckton	FB	1899–1901	0	0	8	0	—	
W.O. Cleminson	HB	1904–1907	0	0	8	1	England amateur	
Nicholson	FW	1907–1909	0	0	8	2	—	
Wake	HB	1907–1909	0	0	8	1	—	
Nick Hendry	GK	1908–1909	0	0	8	0	—	
Fred Wilkinson	FW	1909–1912	0	0	8	2	—	
Dick Harker	FW	1912–1913	0	0	8	0	—	
John Harkins	HB	1912–1913	0	0	8	0	—	
Bob Turner	FW	1912–1913	0	0	8	1	—	
Hector Gilfillan	FW	1927	7	0	7	0	—	
Allan Codling	FW	1938–1939	7	0	7	0	—	
Don Toase	FB	1951	7	0	7	0	England youth	
Eddie Carr	FW	1953	7	0	7	0	—	
Bruce Halliday †	DF	1982	7	0	7	0	—	
Hugh Atkinson †	DF	1985	7	0	7	0	Republic of Ireland U21	
Gary Pallister †	DF	1985	7	0	7	0	England	
Colin Walker †	FW	1986–1987	7	0	7	0	New Zealand	
Keith Gorman	MF	1987	7	2	7	2	—	
Dave Shearer	FW	1989	7	0	7	0	—	
Peter Keen †	GK	2001	7	0	7	0	—	
Tom Newey †	DF	2003	7	1	7	1	—	
Trésor Kandol †	FW	2005–2006	7	2	7	2	DR Congo	(Note: Dagenham & Redbridge)
Paul Mayo †	DF	2008	7	1	7	1	—	
Bryan Hodge †	MF	2008	7	0	7	0	Scotland U20	
Clayton Fortune	DF	2008–2009	7	0	7	0	—	
Dean Gerken †	GK	2009	7	0	7	0	—	(Note: Colchester United)
Ben Jackson †	DF	2019	7	1	7	1	—	
Nathan Lowe †	MF	2022	7	1	7	1	—	(Note: South Shields)
Joe Leesley †	MF	2022	7	1	7	1	England C	(Note: Boston United)
Theo Williams †	FW	2023	7	0	7	0	—	
Cardo Siddik	DF	2023–2024	7	0	7	0	—	
Ken Sykes	FW	1945–1947	6	2	7	3	—	
Hugh Turner	FB	1946–1947	6	0	7	0	—	
Joe Roddom	HB	1950–1951	6	0	7	0	—	
Keith Bambridge	MF	1964–1965	6	0	7	0	—	
Daniel Barbara	FW	1996–1997	6	1	7	2	—	
Phil Hadland	MF	2002	6	0	7	0	—	
Glen Robson	FW	2003	6	0	7	0	—	
Kevin McBride	MF	2007	6	1	7	1	—	
Sébastien Carole	MF	2008	6	0	7	0	Martinique	
Dean Windass	FW	2009	6	0	7	0	—	
Jamie Devitt †	FW	2009	6	1	7	1	Republic of Ireland U21	
Jefferson Louis †	FW	2010–2011	6	0	7	0	Dominica	(Note: Gainsborough Trinity)
Gary Martin †	FW	2020	6	0	7	0	—	(Note: ÍBV)
Bob Graham	FW	1924–1925	5	0	7	0	—	
Norman Cardew	FW	1965	5	1	7	1	—	
Bob Lee	FW	1983	5	0	7	0	—	
Wayne Baker	GK	1986–1987	5	0	7	0	—	
Rui Neves	FW	1995	5	0	7	0	Portugal U21	
Alan Morgan †	MF	2003	5	1	7	1	Scotland youth	
Nathan Jameson	MF	2005	5	0	7	0	—	
John McMahon	FW	1985	4	0	7	3	—	
Frank van der Geest	GK	2000–2001	2	0	7	0	—	
McGregor	FB	1891–1894	0	0	7	0	—	
G. Thompson	FB / HB	1897–1900	0	0	7	0	—	
McRae	HB	1903–1904	0	0	7	0	—	
Woodhouse	HB/FW	1910	0	0	7	2	—	
Matthew Cornock	FW	1910	0	0	7	7	Scottish Junior	
Billy Dinsdale	FW	1921–1922; 1931–1932	6	1	6	1	—	
Bob Mitcheson	FW	1922–1923	6	0	6	0	—	
Jack Martin	FW	1923–1924	6	0	6	0	—	
Walter Creasor	FW	1924–1925	6	1	6	1	—	
Harry Briggs	FW	1925–1927	6	0	6	0	—	
John Wildsmith	FW	1931–1934	6	0	6	0	—	
Albert Bonass	FW	1933	6	1	6	1	—	
George Charlton	FW	1933–1934	6	1	6	1	—	
Dave Mason	FW	1939	6	5	6	5	—	
Bob Hardisty	HB	1946–1948	6	0	6	0	England amateur	
Tom Allison	FW	1946	6	0	6	0	—	
Tom Johnson	HB	1947	6	1	6	1	—	
George Gray	HB	1953	6	0	6	0	—	
Ernie Butler	FW	1953–1954	6	0	6	0	—	
Derrick Clark	FW	1955–1956	6	1	6	1	—	
Jim Storey	FB	1957	6	0	6	0	—	
Ken Solan †	FW	1969	6	1	6	1	—	
Ricky Sbragia †	DF	1985	6	0	6	0	—	
David Riley †	FW	1987	6	2	6	2	—	
Graham Fenton †	FW	2002	6	1	6	1	England U21	(Note: Blackpool)
Lee Matthews †	FW	2003–2004	6	1	6	1	England U18	(Note: Bristol City)
Lee Ridley †	DF	2007–2008	6	0	6	0	—	(Note: Cheltenham Town)
Jacob Blyth †	FW	2023	6	0	6	0	—	(Note: Bradford (Park Avenue))
Joe Colbeck †	MF	2007	6	2	6	2	—	
Russell Hoult †	GK	2009	6	0	6	0	—	
Ole Söderberg †	GK	2012	6	0	6	0	Sweden U21	
James Talbot †	GK	2017–2018	6	0	6	0	Republic of Ireland U19	
Kit Elliott †	FW	2019	6	1	6	1	—	
Finlay Barnes †	FW	2023	6	2	6	2	—	
Kieran Burton †	DF	2023	6	0	6	0	—	
Blaine Rowe	DF	2023–2024	6	0	6	0	—	
Aidan Rutledge †	FW	2024	6	2	6	2	—	
Dugald McCarrison †	FW	1991	5	2	6	2	—	(Note: Celtic)
Lawrie Madden	DF	1993	5	0	6	0	—	
Nathan Porritt †	MF	2009	5	0	6	0	England U18	
David Davis †	MF	2009	5	0	6	0	—	(Note: Wolverhampton Wanderers)
Exodus Geohaghon	DF	2011	5	0	6	0	England semi-pro	
Adam Reach †	MF	2011	5	1	6	1	England U20	
Levi Andoh †	DF	2024	5	0	6	0	—	
John Brackstone	DF	2007–2008	3	0	6	0	—	
Diogo Barbosa	MF	2022	3	0	6	0	Portugal U16	
Melvin Minter †	GK	2020	4	0	6	0	—	(Note: Harrogate Town)
T. Cleghorn	FW	1889–1891	0	0	6	3	—	
McDonald	HB	1890–1892	0	0	6	0	—	
Dunn	FW	1893–1897	0	0	6	3	—	
Willie Watson	FW	1896–1900	0	0	6	1	—	
Tom Rowlandson	GK	1898–1899; 1903–1905	0	0	6	0	England amateur	
Featherstone	FW	1902–1903	0	0	6	5	—	
Woof	FW	1903–1904	0	0	6	2	—	
George Collins	FW	1906–1908	0	0	6	3	—	
Ernest Bertram	HB	1907–1908	0	0	6	2	—	
Fred Boyle	HB	1907–1908	0	0	6	0	—	
Harry Armstrong	FW	1910	0	0	6	1	—	
Jordan Robinson	DF	2013–2014	0	0	6	0	—	
James Brown	GK	1921–1923	5	0	5	0	—	
Bert Hobson	FB	1925–1926	5	0	5	0	—	
Edward Ward	FW	1925	5	0	5	0	—	
Albert Wardell	FW	1930	5	2	5	2	—	
George Turnbull	FW	1931	5	1	5	1	—	
Alex Brown	FW	1936	5	0	5	0	—	
Gordon Williams	FW	1950–1951	5	1	5	1	—	
Harry Woodcock	HB	1953–1954	5	0	5	0	—	
Arthur Nugent	FB	1956–1957	5	0	5	0	—	
Chris Neal	MF	1968	5	0	5	0	—	
Ken Morton	MF	1968–1969	5	0	5	0	English schools	
Steve Senior †	DF	1984	5	0	5	0	—	
Gary Whetter	MF	1986–1987	5	1	5	1	—	
Mark Burke †	MF	1990	5	1	5	1	England youth	
Lee Tucker	MF	1991–1992	5	0	5	0	—	
Howard Clark †	DF	1991	5	0	5	0	—	(Note: Coventry City)
Graham Kavanagh †	MF	1994	5	0	5	0	Republic of Ireland	
Jonathan Atkinson	FW	1997	5	0	5	0	—	
Gustavo Di Lella	MF	1997–1998	5	0	5	0	—	
Steve Baker †	DF	2000	5	0	5	0	Republic of Ireland U21	
Paul Hopkins †	FW	2006	5	1	5	1	England U20	(Note: Everton)
Ville Väisänen	DF	2006	5	0	5	0	Finland	
Jonathan Hogg †	MF	2009	5	1	5	1	—	
Jordan Cook †	FW	2009	5	0	5	0	—	
Daniel Powell †	MF	2010	5	1	5	1	—	(Note: Milton Keynes Dons)
Marcus Maddison	MF	2022	5	0	5	0	England C	
Declan Howe †	FW	2023	5	0	5	0	—	(Note: Cleethorpes Town)
Tom Newton	FB	1928	4	0	5	0	—	
Reg Worsman	FW	1960	4	1	5	1	—	
Andy Gordon	FW	1969	4	0	5	0	—	
Neil Smallwood	GK	1988	4	0	5	0	—	
Neil McNab	MF	1993	4	0	5	0	Scotland U21	
Daniel Chillingworth †	FW	2001	4	1	5	2	—	(Note: Cambridge United)
Shaun Reay	FW	2006–2008	4	0	5	0	—	
Chris Palmer †	MF	2007	4	0	5	0	—	(Note: Wycombe Wanderers)
Matt Green †	FW	2007	4	0	5	0	England C	(Note: Cardiff City)
Michael Flynn †	MF	2008	4	0	5	0	—	
James Bennett	MF	2009	4	0	5	0	—	
Rikki Bains	DF	2009	4	0	5	0	—	
Moses Barnett †	DF	2009	4	0	5	0	England U18	
David Robson †	GK	2023	4	0	5	0	Wales U21	
Jim Simms †	FW	2023	4	0	5	0	—	
Andy O'Dell	MF	1987–1988	3	0	5	0	—	
John Burridge	GK	1995	3	0	5	0	—	
Lehit Zeghdane	MF	2000	3	0	5	0	—	
Colin Smith	DF	1984–1985	2	0	5	0	—	
Phil Shute	FW	1985–1986	2	0	5	0	—	
Mark Bell	GK	2013–2014; 2016	1	0	5	0	—	
Harry Hope	FW	1886–1888	0	0	5	1	—	
R.T. Stabler	HB	1886–1888	0	0	5	2	—	
Tommy Davison	FB	1887–1889	0	0	5	0	—	
Tom Oliver	FW	1894–1895; 1898	0	0	5	4	—	
R. Tennick	HB	1900–1902	0	0	5	0	—	
Isaac Owens	FW	1903; 1909	0	0	5	4	—	
McKenna	FB	1890–1901	0	0	5	0	—	
Walter Page	HB	1903	0	0	5	0	—	
Rule	FB	1903	0	0	5	2	—	
Harvey	FB	1909	0	0	5	1	—	
Bob Mackie	FB	1909	0	0	5	0	—	
McCann	FW	1909	0	0	5	2	—	
Ward	FW	1909	0	0	5	0	—	
Bob Crumley	GK	1911–1912	0	0	5	0	—	
Bert Gosnell	FW	1911–1912	0	0	5	2	England	
Ginger Owers	FW	1911–1912	0	0	5	2	—	
Herbert Tierney	HB	1911–1912	0	0	5	0	—	
Philip Prior	FW	1914–1915	0	0	5	0	—	
Bob Currie	FW	1914–1915	0	0	5	2	—	
George Dodd	FW	1914–1915	0	0	5	3	—	
Billy Ingham	FW	1914–1915	0	0	5	1	—	
Herbert McFerran	FW	1921–1923	4	3	4	3	—	
Jack Andrews	WH	1923–1924	4	0	4	0	—	
William O'Donnell	FB	1928	4	0	4	0	—	
Robert Sharpe	FW	1932	4	0	4	0	—	
David McCrae	FW	1935	4	3	4	3	—	
Les James	FW	1953	4	0	4	0	—	
Tommy Simpson	FB	1957–1958	4	0	4	0	—	
Joe Dumighan	FW	1958–1959	4	1	4	1	—	
John McCann	MF	1964	4	0	4	0	Scotland B	
Terry Johnson †	MF	1969	4	1	4	1	—	
Bobby Malt	FW	1970–1971	4	0	4	0	—	
Mike Spelman †	MF	1972–1973	4	0	4	0	English schools	
John Breckin	FB	1972	4	0	4	0	—	
Willie Whigham	GK	1974	4	0	4	0	—	
Maurice Hepworth †	DF	1975	4	0	4	0	—	
Kevin Glendinning	DF	1981	4	0	4	0	—	
Bobby Hulse	MF	1983	4	0	4	0	—	
Willie Young	DF	1984	4	0	4	0	Scotland U23	
Steve Yates †	DF	1985	4	0	4	0	—	
Joe Joyce †	DF	1993	4	0	4	0	—	
Jason White †	FW	1993	4	1	4	1	—	(Note: Scunthorpe United)
Ian Muir †	FW	1995	4	1	4	1	England youth	(Note: Birmingham City)
David Faulkner	DF	1996	4	0	4	0	England youth	
Willie Giummarra	MF	1997	4	0	4	0	—	
Kevin Scott †	DF	1999	4	0	4	0	—	(Note: Norwich City)
Martin Taylor †	DF	2000	4	0	4	0	England U21	
Gary Caldwell †	DF	2001	4	0	4	0	Scotland	
John Alexander	FW	2002–2003	4	0	4	0	—	
Matthew Bates †	DF	2005	4	0	4	0	England U19	
Kasper Schmeichel †	GK	2006	4	0	4	0	Denmark	(Note: Manchester City)
Anthony Griffith †	MF	2006	4	0	4	0	Montserrat	
Tony Kane †	DF	2009	4	0	4	0	Northern Ireland U21; Republic of Ireland U21	
Richie Byrne	DF	2010	4	0	4	0	Republic of Ireland B	
Jamie Barton	MF	2011–2012	4	1	4	1	—	
Scott Fenwick	FW	2017	4	0	4	0	—	
Alex Wollerton †	MF	2018–2019	4	0	4	0	—	
Dave Partridge	MF	1962	4	0	4	0	—	
Bradley Williams †	MF	2023	4	0	4	0	—	
John Douglas	FW	1986	3	0	4	0	—	
Kevin Maddick	FW	1993–1994	3	0	4	0	—	
Danny Key	MF	1996	3	0	4	0	—	
Dariusz Kubicki	FB	1998	3	0	4	0	Poland	
Ricardo Costa	FW	1999	3	1	4	1	—	
Paul Holsgrove	MF	2000	3	0	4	0	—	
Jon Cullen	MF	2002	3	0	4	0	—	
Michael Coghlan	DF	2003	3	0	4	0	—	
Paul Woolston †	GK	2016	3	0	4	0	—	
Zach Hemming †	GK	2018	3	0	4	0	—	
Levi Amantchi	FW	2020	2	0	4	0	—	
Patrick Almond †	DF	2022–2023	2	0	4	0	—	(Note: Shildon)
J.H. Smeddle	FB	1885–1887	0	0	4	0	—	
Tom Devey	FW	1888–1891	0	0	4	0	—	
J. McCrimmon	FW	1889–1890	0	0	4	0	—	
Richmond	FW	1902–1903	0	0	4	2	—	
T. Hammond	FW	1903	0	0	4	3	—	
C.A. Noble	HB	1905–1907	0	0	4	0	—	
Herbert Denham	FW	1910–1911	0	0	4	1	—	
Tom Heslop	FW	1911–1912	0	0	4	1	—	
Bert Trueman	HB	1913	0	0	4	0	—	
Tom Gilbey	FW	1919–1920	0	0	4	3	—	
Joe Johnson	FW	1919–1920	0	0	4	0	—	
Nathan Fisher	FW	2014	0	0	4	0	—	
Ian Watson	DF	2014–2015	0	0	4	0	—	
Tommy Hampson	GK	1926	3	0	3	0	—	
Bob Hutchinson	FW	1928	3	0	3	0	—	
Tom Allen	HB	1928	3	0	3	0	—	
William Buchanan	FW	1929	3	0	3	0	Scotland amateur	
William Taylor	FB	1930	3	0	3	0	—	
Arthur Dickinson	FB	1932–1933	3	0	3	0	—	
Billy Hutchinson	FW	1932	3	1	3	1	—	
Albert James	FW	1936–1937	3	0	3	0	—	
George Bates	FW	1946	3	0	3	0	—	
Peter Docherty	FW	1950–1951	3	1	3	1	—	
Maurice Mason	HB	1952–1953	3	0	3	0	—	
Peter Price	FW	1954–1955	3	0	3	0	—	
Tommy Murray	FW	1956	3	0	3	0	—	
George Sharp	FW	1957	3	0	3	0	—	
Laurie Brown	DF	1959	3	0	3	0	England amateur	
John Nainby	FW	1959	3	1	3	1	—	
Jimmy Connor	MF	1965	3	0	3	0	—	
Pat Hughes	MF	1965	3	0	3	0	—	
Mike Hunter	MF	1968	3	0	3	0	—	
Paul Fisher	DF	1970	3	0	3	0	—	
Peter Martin	MF	1971	3	0	3	0	—	
Brian Bromley †	MF	1975	3	0	3	0	England youth	(Note: Reading)
Kevin Carr †	GK	1986	3	0	3	0	—	
Chris McClaren	DF	1987	3	0	3	0	—	
Steve Guinan †	FW	1995–1996	3	1	3	1	England semi-pro	
Jamie Speare	GK	1997	3	0	3	0	—	
Jordan Tait	DF	2000	3	0	3	0	—	
Michael Ingham †	GK	2002	3	0	3	0	Northern Ireland	
Taiwo Atieno	FW	2006	3	0	3	0	Kenya	(Note: Walsall)
Robbie Stockdale †	DF	2006	3	0	3	0	Scotland; England U21	
Neale McDermott †	MF	2006	3	0	3	0	England U18	(Note: Fulham)
Mark Albrighton †	DF	2006	3	0	3	0	—	
Johann Smith †	MF	2007	3	0	3	0	United States U20	
Noel Whelan	FW	2009–2010	3	0	3	0	England U21	
Danny Hall †	DF	2009	3	0	3	0	—	(Note: Chesterfield)
Paul Harsley †	MF	2009	3	0	3	0	—	
Ross Chisholm	MF	2010	3	0	3	0	—	
Jordan Marshall	FW	2010	3	0	3	0	—	
Danzelle St Louis-Hamilton	GK	2011	3	0	3	0	—	
Tom Davie †	DF	2016	3	0	3	0	—	(Note: Bradford Park Avenue)
Arran Wearmouth	MF	2017	3	0	3	0	—	
Adam Dawson †	MF	2017	3	0	3	0	—	(Note: Tranmere Rovers)
James Beauchamp	FW	2021–2022	3	0	3	0	—	
Brandon Taylor	DF	2021	3	0	3	0	—	
Tom Callaghan	FW	1932	2	0	3	0	—	
Joe West	FW	1935	2	1	3	1	—	
Johnny Goodchild	FW	1967	2	0	3	0	—	
Kevin Pugh	MF	1983	2	0	3	1	—	
Paul Bannon	FW	1983	2	0	3	0	—	
Gary May	MF	1986–1987	2	0	3	0	—	
John Moore †	FW	1986	2	1	3	1	Hong Kong	
Vic Kasule †	MF	1989	2	1	3	0	—	(Note: Shrewsbury Town)
Andy Ripley	MF	1993–1994	2	0	3	0	—	
Lawrence Davies †	FW	1997	2	0	3	0	Wales youth	
Brian Healy	MF	2001	2	1	3	1	England C	
Chris Lumsdon	MF	2009	2	0	3	0	—	
Jack Hannah †	DF	2023	2	0	3	0	—	
Jordan Windass †	DF	2023	2	0	3	0	—	(Note: Oldham Athletic)
Mike Robinson	DF	1988–1989	1	0	3	0	—	
Xavier Barrau	MF	2007	1	0	3	0	—	
Keith Gillespie	MF	2010	1	0	3	0	Northern Ireland	
Ben Dudzinski †	GK	2016	1	0	3	0	—	
Daley	FW	1890	0	0	3	0	—	
Theakston	FB	1890	0	0	3	0	—	
McPherson	FW	1892–1893	0	0	3	1	—	
Lowes	FW	1896–1898	0	0	3	2	—	
C. Swalwell	FW	1899	0	0	3	2	—	
John Brooks	FW	1900	0	0	3	2	—	
Byron	FW	1902	0	0	3	0	—	
Henry Buckton	FW	1904–1905	0	0	3	2	—	
Gilfillan	FW	1903	0	0	3	0	—	
Williamson	FW	1904–1905	0	0	3	0	—	
Starling	FB	1905–1906	0	0	3	0	—	
G. Hope	FW	1907	0	0	3	4	—	
W. Hope	FW	1907	0	0	3	0	—	
Tommy Charlton	FW	1908	0	0	3	3	—	
Arthur Hurdman	FW	1908	0	0	3	0	—	
George McDiarmid	HB	1908	0	0	3	0	—	
Harry Chapelhow	FW	1910	0	0	3	0	—	
Gaudie	FW	1911–1912	0	0	3	0	—	
Jimmy Miller	FW	1920–1921	0	0	3	0	—	
Curtis Edwards	MF	2013	0	0	3	0	—	
Bruno Pilatos	DF	2013	0	0	3	0	England U19	
Steven Johnson	FW	2013	0	0	3	0	—	
Adam Cocks	MF	2014	0	0	3	0	—	
Pat Burke	HB	1921	2	0	2	0	—	
Fred Colling	FW	1921	2	1	2	1	—	
Graham Doggart	FW	1922	2	4	2	4	England	
Norman Creek	FW	1922–1923	2	1	2	1	England	
Hodgson Mitchell	FW	1922	2	0	2	0	—	
Tommy Ross	FW	1923	2	0	2	0	—	
George Johnson	FB	1926	2	0	2	0	—	
Lem Newcomb	HB	1927	2	0	2	0	—	
Alex McLachlan	HB	1927	2	0	2	0	—	
Jimmy Deacon	FW	1927–1928	2	0	2	0	—	
Arthur Neal	FW	1928	2	0	2	0	—	
Charlie Luke	FW	1929	2	0	2	0	—	
Tommy Duff	FW	1930	2	0	2	0	—	
Joe Skidmore	FW	1930	2	0	2	0	—	
John Alderson	FW	1932	2	1	2	1	—	
Sam Evans	FW	1932	2	0	2	0	—	
Jack Downing	FW	1933	2	3	2	3	—	
Charlie MacCartney	FW	1938	2	0	2	0	—	
Billy Middleton	HB	1938	2	0	2	0	—	
Fred Laidman	FW	1949	2	0	2	0	—	
Willie O'Brien	DF	1951	2	0	2	0	—	
George Longridge	GK	1951	2	0	2	0	—	
Roger Howells	FW	1953	2	0	2	0	—	
Eric Oliver	GK	1964	2	0	2	0	—	
John Heaviside	DF	1964	2	0	2	0	—	
Frank Fleming	GK	1964	2	0	2	0	—	
Richard Waters	GK	1965	2	0	2	0	—	
Allan Kell	MF	1968	2	0	2	0	—	
Barry Shaw	MF	1968	2	0	2	0	—	
Ian Larnach	FW	1969–1970	2	1	2	1	—	
Kevin Alderson	MF	1970–1971	2	0	2	0	—	
John Mackin †	DF	1973	2	0	2	0	—	
Steve McDermott	FW	1982	2	0	2	0	—	
Mark Davis	MF	1987	2	0	2	0	—	
Nigel Bolton	FW	1995	2	0	2	0	—	
Wesley Byrne	DF	1996–1997	2	0	2	0	Republic of Ireland U18	
Andy Lonergan †	GK	2002	2	0	2	0	England U20; Republic of Ireland U16	
Keith Gilroy	MF	2005	2	0	2	0	Republic of Ireland U21	
Carl Tremarco †	DF	2009	2	0	2	0	England C	(Note: Wrexham)
Liam Bagnall	DF	2012	2	0	2	0	—	
Brandon Morrison	FW	2018–2019	2	0	2	0	—	
Sanny Lingthep	MF	2018–2019	2	0	2	0	—	
Sam Muggleton †	DF	2019	2	0	2	0	—	
Jamie Holmes	FW	2019	2	0	2	0	—	
Lucas Bell	MF	2019	2	0	2	0	—	
Lexus Beeden	DF	2021	2	0	2	0	—	
Dominic McHale †	MF	2022	2	0	2	0	—	(Note: AFC Telford United)
Oli Thompson †	FW	2024	2	0	2	0	—	
Ken Waterhouse	HB	1964	1	0	2	0	—	
Mike Sanderson	MF	1985–1986	1	0	2	0	—	
Craig Midgley †	FW	1997	1	0	2	0	—	
Michael Carter	FW	1998	1	1	2	1	—	
Ian Harty	FW	2007	1	0	2	0	—	
Andy Evans †	DF	2024	1	0	2	0	—	(Note: Morecambe)
R.B. Buckton	FW	1885–1886	0	0	2	0	—	
J.W. Moore	FB	1885–1886	0	0	2	0	—	
Thackeray	FW	1885–1886	0	0	2	0	—	
Robertshaw	GK	1887	0	0	2	0	—	
R. Middleton	FW	1887	0	0	2	1	—	
D. Rogers	FW	1887	0	0	2	1	—	
Harry Withington	FW	1887–1889	0	0	2	0	—	
Hunter	FW	1890	0	0	2	0	—	
Cook	FW	1891	0	0	2	1	—	
Anderson	FW	1891	0	0	2	1	—	
McNally	FW	1891	0	0	2	1	—	
O'Hara	FW	1891	0	0	2	4	—	
Coleman	FB	1892	0	0	2	1	—	
Billy Fleming	FW	1892	0	0	2	0	—	
Watty Keay	FW	1892	0	0	2	1	—	
McLaine	FW	1892–1893	0	0	2	0	—	
Phillips	HB	1896–1897	0	0	2	0	—	
Hogg	FW	1902	0	0	2	2	—	
Harry Douglas	FW	1904	0	0	2	2	—	
Hill	FB	1902	0	0	2	0	—	
Young	FW	1904	0	0	2	1	—	
Gordon Burniston	FW	1906	0	0	2	1	—	
Etherington	FW	1906	0	0	2	0	—	
Kennedy	FW	1906	0	0	2	0	—	
Powell	FW	1906	0	0	2	0	—	
Moore	FW	1907	0	0	2	0	—	
Bill Godley	FW	1908	0	0	2	1	—	
Baker	FW	1908	0	0	2	0	—	
Downie	FW	1909	0	0	2	0	—	
Smith	FW	1909	0	0	2	0	—	
John McLeod	FB	1912	0	0	2	0	—	
Harry Middleton	HB	1912	0	0	2	0	—	
Val Lawrence	FW	1919	0	0	2	0	—	
Fred Graver	FW	1920–1921	0	0	2	3	—	
Sid Williams	FW	1945	0	0	2	0	—	
Gary Bell	MF	1984–1985	0	0	2	0	—	
Stephen Sherry	GK	1986	0	0	2	0	—	
Martin McGrother	GK	1986	0	0	2	0	—	
Paul Robinson	FW	2013	0	0	2	1	—	
Jonny Davis	MF	2013	0	0	2	0	—	
Ryan Noble	FW	2014	0	0	2	0	England U19	
Matthew Lovegreen	DF	2014	0	0	2	0	—	
Anthony Callaghan	DF	2015	0	0	2	0	England U16	
Lewis Gibbons	MF / DF	2015	0	0	2	0	—	
Lee Gaskell	FW	2015	0	0	2	0	—	
John Henery	FW	1922	1	0	1	0	—	
Ernie Gray	FW	1922	1	0	1	0	—	
David Moir	HB	1923	1	0	1	0	—	
George Harrison	HB	1925	1	0	1	0	—	
George McLaughlan	FW	1926	1	0	1	0	—	
Tom Carmedy	FW	1927	1	0	1	0	—	
John Harris	FW	1927	1	1	1	1	—	
John O'Connor	FW	1927	1	0	1	0	—	
Charles Yorke	FW	1927	1	0	1	0	—	
John Dodsworth	HB	1928	1	0	1	0	—	
John Armstrong	HB	1928	1	0	1	0	—	
John Smith	FW	1928	1	0	1	0	—	
Barney McCabe	FW	1928	1	0	1	0	—	
Billy Oxley	FW	1928	1	1	1	1	—	
Jim Tinnion	HB	1929	1	0	1	0	—	
Len Alsop	FW	1930	1	0	1	0	—	
Tom Tomlinson	HB	1932	1	0	1	0	—	
Henry Robinson	FW	1932	1	0	1	0	—	
Joe McEnaney	FW	1934	1	0	1	0	—	
Ralph Makepeace	HB	1935	1	0	1	0	—	
William Hetherington	FW	1936	1	0	1	0	—	
Tom Connaboy	FW	1937	1	0	1	0	—	
Peter McCrory	FW	1937	1	0	1	0	—	
Percy Jameson	FW	1939	1	0	1	0	—	
John Coxon	FB	1946	1	0	1	0	—	
Ernie Egdell	HB	1946	1	0	1	0	—	
Dick Everitt	FW	1946	1	0	1	0	—	
Bill Harburn	FW	1947	1	0	1	0	—	
John Thorns	FW	1950	1	0	1	0	—	
Tommy MacVinish	FW	1950	1	0	1	0	—	
Don Maddison	GK	1951	1	0	1	0	—	
Ken Liddle	FW	1951	1	0	1	0	—	
Tom Nixon	HB	1951	1	0	1	0	—	
Ian Brydon	FW	1953	1	0	1	0	—	
Bob Swankie	HB	1954	1	0	1	0	—	
Alan Parkes	FW	1955	1	0	1	0	—	
Alex Napier	FW	1955	1	0	1	0	—	
Tom Moore	GK	1957	1	0	1	0	—	
Frank Wayman	FW	1957	1	0	1	0	—	
Brian Linighan	DF	1958	1	1	1	1	—	
Bob Armstrong	FW	1959	1	0	1	0	—	
Tom Robson	DF	1960	1	0	1	0	—	
Graham Urwin	MF	1967	1	0	1	0	—	
Dave Gallant	FW	1968	1	0	1	0	—	
Matt Robson †	DF	1975	1	0	1	0	—	
Roch Karaa	GK	1985	1	0	1	0	Tunisia U21	
Jim Rodwell	DF	1988	1	0	1	0	—	
Allan Evans	DF	1991	1	0	1	0	Scotland	
Jimmy Case	MF	1993	1	0	1	0	England U23	
Paul Cooper	MF	1993	1	0	1	0	—	
Ryan Scott	GK	1993	1	0	1	0	—	
José Quitongo	MF	1995	1	0	1	0	—	
Ashlyn Stephenson	GK	1995	1	0	1	0	England U18	
Michael Collins	MF	1996	1	0	1	0	Northern Ireland youth	
John McClelland	DF	1996	1	0	1	0	Northern Ireland	
Mark Hope	DF	1997	1	0	1	0	—	
David Hunt	DF	1997	1	0	1	0	—	
David Hilton	DF	1997	1	0	1	0	England U16	
Lucas Papaconstantinou	GK	1997	1	0	1	0	—	
Craig Skelton	FW	2000	1	0	1	0	—	
Jean-Michel Cau	FW	2001	1	0	1	0	—	
Ross Turnbull †	GK	2003	1	0	1	0	England U20	
Chris Mason	DF	2004	1	0	1	0	—	
Richard Logan	MF	2005	1	0	1	0	—	
James Beaumont †	MF	2006	1	0	1	0	—	
Josh Wright	MF	2006	1	0	1	0	—	
Lewis Hardman	DF	2007	1	0	1	0	—	
Ashlee Jones	GK	2009	1	0	1	0	—	
Nialle Rodney †	FW	2011	1	0	1	0	—	
Jordan Nixon	GK	2012	1	0	1	0	—	
Lewis Nightingale	MF	2016	1	0	1	0	—	
Lewis Walker †	FW	2017	1	0	1	0	—	(Note: Derby County)
Bradley Moncur	MF	2018	1	0	1	0	—	
Jamie O'Brien	FW	2018	1	0	1	0	—	
Tom Lycett	DF	2018	1	0	1	0	—	
Ciaran Banks	DF	2018	1	0	1	0	—	
Harry Stansfield	MF	2019	1	0	1	0	—	
Rhys Armstrong	FW	2019	1	0	1	0	—	
Mason Hurworth	MF	2019	1	0	1	0	—	
Joey Hope	DF	2021	1	0	1	0	—	
Charlie Winfield †	DF	2023	1	0	1	0	—	
Kenzie Harker	MF	2023	1	0	1	0	—	
Joe Gibson †	DF	2024	1	0	1	0	—	
J.R. Bibby	FW	1885	0	0	1	0	—	
Garbutt	GK	1885	0	0	1	0	—	
C.L. Glover	FW	1885	0	0	1	0	—	
Harrison	HB	1885	0	0	1	0	—	
T. Rickinson	HB	1885	0	0	1	0	—	
Charles Craven	GK	1886	0	0	1	0	—	
Henry	FW	1886	0	0	1	1	—	
G. Paylor	HB	1886	0	0	1	0	—	
W. Brooks	FW	1887	0	0	1	1	—	
Michael Hope	FW	1887	0	0	1	1	—	
Robinson	FW	1887	0	0	1	0	—	
Grieveson	HB	1887	0	0	1	0	—	
Henderson	FB	1887	0	0	1	0	—	
Arthur Wharton	GK	1887	0	0	1	0	—	
Wilson	FW	1887	0	0	1	1	—	
Dawes	FB	1888	0	0	1	0	—	
S. Reeves	FW	1888	0	0	1	0	—	
Rodger	FW	1888	0	0	1	0	—	
Soulsby	HB	1888	0	0	1	0	—	
Jim Brown	FW	1889	0	0	1	0	—	
Carling	FW	1889	0	0	1	0	—	
Barker	GK	1891	0	0	1	0	—	
Calligan	HB	1891	0	0	1	0	—	
Calvert	FW	1891	0	0	1	0	—	
Fawcett	FW	1891	0	0	1	0	—	
Hope	HB	1891	0	0	1	0	—	
Williamson	HB	1891	0	0	1	0	—	
Harry Matthew	HB	1891	0	0	1	0	—	
McFarlane	FW	1892	0	0	1	0	—	
Ingram	FW	1893	0	0	1	0	—	
Ramsdale	HB	1893	0	0	1	0	—	
Mason	FW	1894	0	0	1	0	—	
Jack Almond	FW	1895	0	0	1	1	—	
Hildon	FW	1895	0	0	1	0	—	
Hughes	HB	1895	0	0	1	0	—	
Lumley	HB	1895	0	0	1	0	—	
Park	GK	1895	0	0	1	0	—	
Cagle	FB	1897	0	0	1	0	—	
Cooke	GK	1897	0	0	1	0	—	
Swanson	FW	1897	0	0	1	0	—	
Denham	FW	1899	0	0	1	0	—	
T. Taylor	FW	1900	0	0	1	0	—	
Arthur Creasor	FW	1901	0	0	1	0	—	
Hardy	FW	1901	0	0	1	0	—	
Purvis	FW	1901	0	0	1	0	—	
Goodman	HB	1902	0	0	1	0	—	
Morris	FW	1902	0	0	1	0	—	
Horn	FW	1902	0	0	1	0	—	
Ridsdale	HB	1903	0	0	1	0	—	
Harold Boddington	FW	1904	0	0	1	1	—	
Murtha	FW	1905	0	0	1	0	—	
John Shaw	FW	1905	0	0	1	0	—	
T. Spence	FW	1905	0	0	1	0	—	
Walker	HB	1906	0	0	1	0	—	
Brown	FW	1906	0	0	1	0	—	
Jones	FW	1907	0	0	1	0	—	
Tom Blaylock	FW	1907	0	0	1	1	—	
Bell	FW	1907	0	0	1	0	—	
Trees	GK	1907	0	0	1	0	—	
Blythe	HB	1908	0	0	1	1	—	
Charles Reed	FB	1908	0	0	1	0	—	
Murphy	FW	1908	0	0	1	0	—	
Brown	FW	1909	0	0	1	0	—	
Milson	FW	1909	0	0	1	0	—	
Pearson	FB	1910	0	0	1	0	—	
Nicholson	GK	1910	0	0	1	0	—	
Brennan	FW	1910	0	0	1	1	—	
Welch	FW	1910	0	0	1	0	—	
Jack Hall	FB	1919	0	0	1	0	—	
William Kirsop	FW	1920	0	0	1	0	—	
Bill Laverick	FW	1921	0	0	1	0	—	
George Mullen	FW	1923	0	0	1	1	—	
Kevin Wolfe	GK	1984	0	0	1	0	—	
Chris Anthony	GK	1985	0	0	1	0	—	
Stephen Wright	MF	1985	0	0	1	0	—	
Matthew Coddington	GK	1990	0	0	1	0	—	
Dixon	??	1990	0	0	1	0	—	
Chris Hope	DF	1990	0	0	1	0	—	
Nicky Southall	MF	1990	0	0	1	0	—	
Magnus Andersson	FW	1995	0	0	1	0	—	
Michael Pugh	MF	1995	0	0	1	0	—	
Ben Hickey	MF	1999	0	0	1	0	—	
Leandro Scartascini	FW	2004	0	0	1	0	—	
Adam Reed	MF	2014	0	0	1	0	Philippines	
Nathan Stephenson	FW	2014	0	0	1	0	—	
Ryan Brobbel	MF	2015	0	0	1	0	Northern Ireland U21	
Anthony Bell	MF	2015	0	0	1	0	—	
Jakub Hymr	FW	2015	0	0	1	0	Czech Republic U18	
Lewis Walton	DF	2015	0	0	1	1	—	
Rob Youhill	MF	2015	0	0	1	0	—	
Lee Hume	MF	2015–2017	0	0	1	0	—	
Sol Brynn †	GK	2021	0	0	1	0	—	

== Footnotes ==
Player statistics include games played while on loan from:

== Sources ==
- Joyce, Michael (2004). Football League Players' Records 1888 to 1939. Nottingham: SoccerData. ISBN 978-1-899468-67-6.
- McColl, Brian; Gorman, Douglas; Campbell, George (2017). Forgotten Glories. British Amateur International Football 1901–1974 (PDF) (2nd ed.). Scottish Football Historical Archive. ISBN 978-1-326-35601-9. Archived from the original (PDF) on 28 July 2017.
- Rollin, Glenda; Rollin, Jack, eds. (2010). Sky Sports Football Yearbook 2010–2011. Headline. ISBN 978-0-7553-6107-6.
- Tweddle, Frank (2000). The Definitive Darlington F.C. Nottingham: SoccerData. ISBN 978-1-899468-15-7.
