= William Coyle =

William, Bill or Billy Coyle may refer to:

- William R. Coyle (1878–1962), U.S. Representative from Pennsylvania
- William J. Coyle (1888–1977), Lieutenant Governor of Washington
- Bill Coyle (baseball), pitcher in Major League Baseball
- Bill Coyle (poet), American poet and translator
- Billy Coyle (footballer) (born 1926), English footballer
- Billy Coyle, candidate in the United States House of Representatives elections in Oklahoma, 2010
