= Maddick =

Maddick is a surname. Notable people with the surname include:

- Edmund Distin Maddick (1857–1939), English surgeon and pioneer of cinema
- Hayley Maddick (born 1992), Australian rugby league footballer
- Kevin Maddick (born 1974), English footballer

== See also ==
- Maddock (surname)
