= Steve McMahon (disambiguation) =

Steve McMahon (born 1961), English international football player and manager.

Steve McMahon may also refer to:

- Steve McMahon (footballer, born 1970), Scottish football defender or forward with clubs in England, Scotland and China
- Steve McMahon (footballer, born 1984), English football player, son of Steve McMahon
- Steve McMahon (consultant), American lawyer and media consultant

== See also ==
- Stephen MacMahon, British-Australian academic
- Stephen J. McMahon (1881–1960), United States Tax Court judge
