= John Blythe (footballer) =

English footballer

Personal information
- Full name: John Alfred Blythe
- Date of birth: 31 January 1924
- Place of birth: Darlington, England
- Date of death: June 2007 (aged 83)
- Place of death: Durham, England
- Position: Centre half

Senior career*
Years	Team	Apps	(Gls)
1944–1949	Darlington	17	(0)
1949–19??	Stockton		
- * Club domestic league appearances and goals

John Alfred Blythe (31 January 1924 – June 2007) was an English footballer who made 17 appearances in the Football League playing as a centre half for Darlington.

Blythe was born in Darlington, County Durham. During the Second World War, he served with the 20th Battalion of the Durham Home Guard. He began his senior football career with Darlington. He played 12 times for them in the wartime leagues from the 1944–45 season onwards, and made his Third Division North debut early in the first post-war season. With Tom Kelly established at centre half, Blythe appeared only infrequently for Darlington's first team, making 17 Football League appearances in three years. He played in the first six matches of the 1948–49 season, but did not appear again until March 1949, after Kelly suffered a head injury.

He left at the end of the season for North-Eastern League club Stockton, where he was appointed captain. Blythe was selected for the Rest of the League XI for the annual match against the North-Eastern League champions, in this case Middlesbrough Reserves, in September 1949.

Blythe died in June 2007 in Durham at the age of 83.
