= Tom Moore (footballer) =

English footballer

Personal information
- Full name: Thomas Lynch Moore
- Date of birth: 25 July 1936 (age 90)
- Place of birth: Trimdon, England
- Position: Goalkeeper

Senior career*
Years	Team	Apps	(Gls)
195?–1956	Trimdon Grange		
1956–1957	Darlington	1	(0)
1957–19??	Wingate Welfare		
- * Club domestic league appearances and goals

Thomas Lynch Moore (born 25 July 1936) is an English former amateur footballer who played as a goalkeeper in the Football League for Darlington.

Moore was born in Trimdon, County Durham. He played football for his local club, Trimdon Grange of the Wearside League, before joining Darlington during the 1956–57 season. He played regularly for the reserves in the North-Eastern League, but appeared only once for the first team, standing in for Ron Ward for the Fourth Division match at home to York City on 13 April 1957. Darlington lost 4–2, and another debutant, John Tennant, came in for the next match. He later returned to the Wearside League with Wingate Welfare.
