= James Brown (footballer, born 1902) =

English footballer

Personal information
- Full name: James Benjamin Brown
- Date of birth: 15 October 1902
- Place of birth: Barnard Castle, England
- Date of death: 1965 (aged 62–63)
- Height: 5 ft 8 1/2 in (1.74 m)
- Position: Goalkeeper

Senior career*
Years	Team	Apps	(Gls)
- Barnard Castle United
1921–1923	Darlington	5	(0)
- * Club domestic league appearances and goals

James Benjamin Brown (15 October 1902 – 1965) was an English amateur footballer who played in the Football League as a goalkeeper for Darlington in the 1920s. He was the club's third-choice goalkeeper, behind Andy Greig and John Ward, and made only five appearances in Darlington's first two seasons in the Third Division North, three in 1921–22 and two in 1922–23. Before joining Darlington he played non-league football for Barnard Castle United.
