= Ernie Egdell =

English footballer (1922–1976)

Personal information
- Full name: Ernest Egdell
- Date of birth: 29 May 1922
- Place of birth: Newcastle upon Tyne, England
- Date of death: 27 February 1976 (aged 53)
- Place of death: Salford, England
- Position: Full back

Senior career*
Years	Team	Apps	(Gls)
–	Consett		
1946–1947	Darlington	1	(0)
- * Club domestic league appearances and goals

Ernest Egdell (29 May 1922 – 27 February 1976) was an English amateur footballer who played in the Football League for Darlington and in non-league football for Consett. He appeared only once for Darlington in competitive matches, on 16 September 1946, standing in for Tom Kelly at right back in a 4–1 Third Division North defeat away to local rivals Hartlepools United. The West Hartlepool-based Northern Daily Mail match report refers to him as "Edgehill".

Egdell was born in Newcastle upon Tyne in 1922, and died in Salford, Greater Manchester, in 1976 at the age of 53.
