= Dave Crampton =

English footballer

Personal information
- Full name: David William Crampton
- Date of birth: 9 June 1949
- Place of birth: Bearpark, County Durham, England
- Position: Goalkeeper

Senior career*
| Years | Team | Apps | (Gls) |
| 1967–1968 | Spennymoor United | | |
| 1968–1969 | Blackburn Rovers | 0 | (0) |
| 1969–1970 | Darlington | 14 | (0) |
- * Club domestic league appearances and goals

David William Crampton (born 9 June 1949) is an English footballer who played as a goalkeeper in the Football League for Darlington. He began his career in non-league football with Spennymoor United, and was on the books of Blackburn Rovers without representing them in the league.
