= Billy Neale =

English footballer

Personal information
- Full name: William Elwood Neale
- Date of birth: 20 May 1933
- Place of birth: Wallsend, England
- Date of death: October 2001 (aged 68)
- Place of death: North Tyneside, England
- Position: Wing half

Senior career*
Years	Team	Apps	(Gls)
1950–195?	Sunderland	0	(0)
195?–1957	North Shields		
1957–1958	Darlington	15	(0)
- North Shields
- * Club domestic league appearances and goals

William Elwood Neale (20 May 1933 – October 2001) was an English footballer who played as a wing half in the Football League for Darlington, and in non-league football for North Shields. He was on the books of Sunderland without playing for their first team. He did contribute to the club's "A" team winning the 1950–51 Wearside League title and two other trophies. According to the Sunderland Echo, "right half Neale, although on the small side, used both feet, distributed the ball well, and was a bundle of energy all the way through" the final of the Monkwearmouth Charity Cup.
