= Joe Skidmore =

English footballer

Personal information
- Full name: Joseph Skidmore
- Position: Inside left

Senior career*
Years	Team	Apps	(Gls)
1930–1931	Darlington	2	(0)
- * Club domestic league appearances and goals

Joseph Skidmore (active 1930–31) was an English footballer who played as an inside left in the Football League for Darlington. He came into Darlington's team for a 1–1 draw with Gateshead on 11 October 1930 and kept his place for the next match, away to Wrexham. After a 2–0 defeat in which Darlington were outclassed by their hosts, he lost his place and was not selected again.
