= Carl Pepper =

English footballer

Personal information
- Full name: Carl Pepper
- Date of birth: 26 July 1980 (age 46)
- Place of birth: Darlington, England
- Height: 5 ft 11 in (1.80 m)
- Position: Midfielder

Team information
- Current team: Darlington Railway Athletic

Senior career*
Years	Team	Apps	(Gls)
1998–2000	Darlington	6	(0)
- Blyth Spartans
- Tow Law Town
- Darlington Railway Athletic
- * Club domestic league appearances and goals

Carl Pepper (born 26 July 1980) is an English footballer who plays for Darlington Railway Athletic.

Pepper plays in midfield and his previous clubs include Darlington, for whom he appeared in the Football League. He made his Darlington Railway Athletic debut on 11 August 2007 against Prudhoe.
