= Peter Martin (English footballer) =

English footballer

Personal information
- Full name: Peter Martin
- Date of birth: 29 December 1950 (age 75)
- Place of birth: South Shields, England
- Position: Left winger

Youth career
- Chilton B.C.

Senior career*
| Years | Team | Apps | (Gls) |
| 1969–1971 | Middlesbrough | 0 | (0) |
| 1971 | Darlington | 3 | (0) |
| 1971–1973 | Barnsley | 26 | (6) |
| 1973–1976 | Cambridge City | | |
| 1976–1977 | Chelmsford City | | |
| 1977–1978 | Cambridge City | | |
| 1978–1979 | Bedford Town | 12 | (2) |
| 1979–19?? | Cambridge City | | |
- * Club domestic league appearances and goals

Peter Martin (born 29 December 1950) is an English former footballer who played as a left winger in the Football League for Darlington and Barnsley. He began his senior career with Middlesbrough, without playing for them in the League, and went on to play in the Southern League for Cambridge City (in three spells), Chelmsford City, and Bedford Town.
