= Bob Swankie =

Scottish footballer

Personal information
- Full name: Robert Beattie Swankie
- Date of birth: 25 February 1932
- Place of birth: Arbroath, Scotland
- Date of death: 28 June 2011 (aged 79)
- Place of death: Gloucester, England
- Position: Wing half

Senior career*
Years	Team	Apps	(Gls)
1950–1951	Burnley	0	(0)
1951–1954	Gloucester City	?	(?)
1954	Darlington	1	(0)
	Kidderminster Harriers	?	(?)
- * Club domestic league appearances and goals

Robert Beattie "Bob" Swankie (25 February 1932 – 28 June 2011) was a Scottish former professional footballer who played as a wing half. He played one match in the Football League for Darlington in 1954.
