= Tommy MacVinish =

Scottish footballer

Personal information
- Full name: Thomas Ross MacVinish
- Date of birth: 1 January 1921
- Place of birth: Inverness, Scotland
- Date of death: 19 September 1965 (aged 44)
- Place of death: Aberdeen, Scotland
- Position: Outside left

Senior career*
Years	Team	Apps	(Gls)
–	Inverness Caledonian		
1946–1948	Hamilton Academical	38	(12)
1948–1950	Preston North End	0	(0)
1950–1951	Darlington	1	(0)
1951–1952	Greenock Morton	40	(3)
1952–1953	St Johnstone	7	(0)
- * Club domestic league appearances and goals

Thomas Ross MacVinish (1 January 1921 – 19 September 1965) was a Scottish footballer who played as an outside left in the Scottish League for Hamilton Academical, Greenock Morton and St Johnstone and in the English Football League for Darlington. He began his senior career with Inverness Caledonian, and was on the books of Preston North End without playing League football for them.

While still playing for Morton, MacVinish lived and trained at Aberdeen, where he kept a grocer's shop.
