= Jack Andrews (footballer) =

English footballer

Personal information
- Full name: John Henry Andrews
- Date of birth: 26 May 1898
- Place of birth: Darlington, County Durham, England
- Date of death: 12 May 1974 (aged 75)
- Place of death: Darlington, County Durham, England
- Height: 5 ft 8 in (1.73 m)
- Positions: Left half; left back

Senior career*
Years	Team	Apps	(Gls)
1922–1924	Darlington	4	(0)
	Durham City	0	(0)
	Grimsby Town	0	(0)
- Shildon
1925–1929	Southend United	74	(1)
1929–1930	Darlington	0	(0)
- * Club domestic league appearances and goals

John Henry Andrews (26 May 1898 – 12 May 1974) was an English footballer who made 78 appearances in the Football League playing at left half or left back for Darlington and Southend United in the 1920s. He was on the books of Durham City and Grimsby Town, without representing either in the League, played non-league football for Shildon, and returned for a second spell with Darlington ahead of the 1929–30 season, but without playing league football for them.

Andrews headed the opening goal when Third Division Southend beat Second Division leaders Derby County by four goals to one in the fourth round of the 1925–26 FA Cup.
