= Peter Bainbridge (footballer) =

English footballer

Personal information
- Full name: Peter Edgar Bainbridge
- Date of birth: 30 January 1958 (age 68)
- Place of birth: Newton-on-Ouse, North Riding of Yorkshire, England
- Height: 5 ft 11 in (1.80 m)
- Position: Defender

Youth career
- Middlesbrough

Senior career*
Years	Team	Apps	(Gls)
- Selby Town
- Huby
- Sheriff Hutton
	Hartlepool United	0	(0)
1976–1979	York City	9	(0)
1979–	Darlington	16	(0)
- Whitby Town
- Selby Town
Total		25	(0)
- * Club domestic league appearances and goals

Peter Edgar Bainbridge (born 30 January 1958) is an English former professional footballer who played as a defender in the Football League for York City and Darlington, in non-League football for Selby Town, Huby, Sheriff Hutton and Whitby Town, and was on the books of Middlesbrough and Hartlepool United without making a league appearance.
