= Tom Nixon (footballer, born 1931) =

English footballer

Personal information
- Full name: Thomas Nixon
- Date of birth: 25 March 1931
- Place of birth: Backworth, England
- Date of death: November 2003 (aged 72)
- Place of death: North Tyneside, England
- Position: Wing half

Senior career*
Years	Team	Apps	(Gls)
1950	Newcastle United	0	(0)
1951–1952	Darlington	1	(0)
- * Club domestic league appearances and goals

Thomas Nixon (25 May 1931 – November 2003) is an English former amateur footballer who played as a wing half in the Football League for Darlington. He was on the books of Newcastle United without playing for their first team.

Nixon came into the Darlington side at left half as one of several team changes for the visit to Halifax Town in the Third Division North on 1 December 1951. They lost 4–1, and that was his only senior appearance.

He was born in Backworth, Northumberland, in 1931 and died in North Tyneside in 2003 at the age of 72.
