= Billy Dunlop (footballer, born 1926) =

Scottish footballer

Personal information
- Full name: William Lumsden Dunlop
- Date of birth: 20 February 1926
- Place of birth: Airdrie, Scotland
- Date of death: 1994 (aged 68) (Note: Dunlop's death at the age of 68 was registered in August 1994 in the Torbay registration district.)
- Place of death: Torbay, England
- Position: Inside forward

Senior career*
Years	Team	Apps	(Gls)
–	Kilsyth Rangers		
1949–1950	Dunfermline Athletic	8	(0)
1950–1951	Exeter City	4	(0)
1951–1952	Ilfracombe Town		
1952–1953	Bristol Rovers	0	(0)
1953–1954	Bradford Park Avenue	36	(12)
1954–1955	Darlington	18	(2)
1955–19??	Bideford		
- * Club domestic league appearances and goals

William Lumsden Dunlop (20 February 1926 – 1994) was a Scottish footballer who played as an inside forward for Dunfermline Athletic in the Scottish Football League and for Exeter City, Bradford Park Avenue and Darlington in the English Football League. He was on the books of Bristol Rovers without appearing for them in the League. Dunlop also played for Scottish junior club Kilsyth Rangers and in English non-league football for Ilfracombe Town and Bideford.
