= George Longridge =

Scottish footballer (1931–1998)

George Paterson Longridge
Personal information
- Full name: George Paterson Longridge
- Date of birth: 23 August 1931
- Place of birth: Glasgow, Scotland
- Date of death: 8 June 1998 (aged 66)
- Place of death: Effort, Pennsylvania, USA
- Position: Goalkeeper

Youth career
- –: Denniestoun Juveniles

Senior career*
Years	Team	Apps	(Gls)
1950–1951	Leyton Orient	0	(0)
1951–1952	Darlington	2	(0)
1952–1954	Third Lanark	0	(0)
–	Sittingbourne		
–	Ramsgate		
1959–1961	Chelmsford City		
1961	West Ham United	0	(0)
1961–196?	East Stirlingshire	5	(0)
- * Club domestic league appearances and goals

George Paterson Longridge (23 August 1931 – 8 June 1998) was a Scottish footballer who played as a goalkeeper in the English Football League for Darlington and in the Scottish Football League for East Stirlingshire. He was on the books of Leyton Orient and West Ham United in England and Third Lanark in Scotland without playing League football for any, and also played English non-league football for Sittingbourne, Ramsgate and Chelmsford City. After finishing his playing career he emigrated to the United States.

== Life and career ==
Longridge was born in Glasgow, Scotland, in 1931, the son of Warnock Longridge and his wife, Jean McCorkle. He began his football career with Dennistoun Juveniles, represented his country at youth international level, and in April 1950, signed for English Third Division South club Leyton Orient. Manager Alec Stock invited the Dennistoun club to play a friendly match against an Orient junior side in September in the hope of making more such signings. Longridge played for the club's reserve team, but not for the first team, and moved on to Division North club in September 1951.

He began his Darlington career in the reserves, and played twice in the League after regular goalkeeper Billy Dunn asked for a transfer, before returning to the reserves again. In 1952, he returned to Scotland where he joined Third Lanark. Again, he played no senior League football for the club, instead playing for the reserve team in the C Division and in friendlies.

Longridge returned to England in 1954, where he played in the Kent League for Sittingbourne and then Ramsgate Athletic, for whom he kept a clean sheet against Margate on 9 November 1957. In 1959, he signed for Southern League club Chelmsford City, for whom he made his first-team debut on 22 August in a 2–2 draw with Worcester City. After a spell with West Ham United, Longridge returned to Scotland where he signed for East Stirlingshire in September 1961. He made five appearances in Division Two that season.

Longridge moved to the United States in 1967. He coached semi-professional football in Canada and in New Jersey, and was involved with the development of youth football after moving to Pennsylvania. He was married to Margaret Whalen; the couple settled in Effort, Pennsylvania, where he ran a plumbing and heating company. They had three children, George, Jane and Christine. Longridge died at home on 8 June 1998 at the age of 66.
