= Sam White (footballer) =

English footballer

Personal information
- Full name: Samuel White
- Date of birth: 15 May 1903
- Place of birth: Newburn, Northumberland, England
- Date of death: 1972 (aged 68–69)
- Height: 5 ft 9 1/2 in (1.77 m)
- Position: Outside right

Senior career*
Years	Team	Apps	(Gls)
–	Newburn		
192?–1927	Annfield Plain		
1927–1928	Leeds United	0	(0)
1928–1929	Hull City	0	(0)
1929–1930	Darlington	9	(2)
- * Club domestic league appearances and goals

Samuel White (15 May 1903 – 1972) was an English footballer who played as an outside right in the Football League for Darlington. Before joining Darlington, he was on the books of Leeds United and Hull City without playing in the League for either.

== Life and career ==
White was born on 15 May 1903 in Newburn, Northumberland, the son of John White, an engineering fitter and turner, and his wife Barbara. At the time of the 1911 UK Census, the family was living in nearby Walbottle and the seven-year-old White was the fifth of nine surviving children. He played football for Newburn and for Annfield Plain before joining Second Division club Leeds United in May 1927. He played for Leeds' reserves in the Central League, but not for the first team, and moved on to Second Division Hull City a year later. Again, he never played for their first team, and after winger Billy Eden left for Sunderland in October 1929, Darlington signed White in his position. He scored twice from nine Third Division North matches, and was not retained at the end of the season.

White's older brother Bob also played in the Football League.

White died in 1972, aged 68 or 69.
