= Maurice Hepworth =

English footballer

Personal information
- Full name: Maurice Hepworth
- Date of birth: 6 September 1953 (age 73)
- Place of birth: Hexham, England
- Position: Full back

Youth career
- Sunderland

Senior career*
Years	Team	Apps	(Gls)
1970–197?	Sunderland	2	(0)
1974	→ Arcadia Shepherds (loan)		
1975	→ Darlington (loan)	4	(0)
197?–1980	Arcadia Shepherds		
- * Club domestic league appearances and goals

Maurice Hepworth (born 6 September 1953) is an English former footballer who played in the Football League as a full back for Sunderland and Darlington. He went on to play in South Africa for Arcadia Shepherds.

== Life and career ==
Hepworth was born in Hexham, Northumberland, where he attended Queen Elizabeth Grammar School. He began his football career with Sunderland, and made his first-team debut as a 17-year-old, on 12 April 1971 in a 3–1 win in a Second Division match at Bolton Wanderers. He played once more that season before returning to the reserves. In 1972–73, Hepworth was in and around the first-team squad approaching the FA Cup Final, when with a week to go, he was kicked in the stomach during a reserve match and suffered life-threatening internal injuries.

When he recovered, he went to South Africa and helped Arcadia Shepherds win a treble of National Football League, NFL Cup and UTC Bowl. On returning to England, he played a few matches for Darlington on loan, but it was clear he would not be able to play for Sunderland again. He went back to Arcadia Shepherds, was Player of the Year in 1977, and played for them until a broken leg ended his career in 1980.

He worked in a managerial role for drinks and fast-food companies, then in 2010 set up a coaching and leadership business working with schools, sportspeople and those employed in the drinks trade. He is a Christian.
