= Bob Turner (cricketer, born 1885) =

English cricketer

Robert Frewen Turner (15 July 1885 – 15 February 1959) was an English cricketer active from 1909 to 1911 who played for Leicestershire. He was born in Leicester and died in Darlington. He appeared in twenty first-class matches as a righthanded batsman who scored 525 runs with a highest score of 41 and took nine wickets with a best performance of two for 2.
