= Stewart McPhee =

English footballer

Personal information
- Full name: Stewart Douglas McPhee
- Date of birth: 5 January 1965 (age 61)
- Place of birth: Middlesbrough, England
- Height: 5 ft 8 in (1.73 m)
- Position: Midfielder

Senior career*
Years	Team	Apps	(Gls)
1983–198?	Middlesbrough	0	(0)
198?–1986	Whitby Town		(3)
1986–1987	Darlington	9	(1)
- Stockton
- * Club domestic league appearances and goals

Stewart Douglas McPhee (born 5 January 1965) is an English former footballer who played as a midfielder in the Football League for Darlington, for Whitby Town in the Northern League, and for Stockton. He was on Middlesbrough's books, but never played for them in the League.
