= Daniel Barbara =

French footballer (born 1974)

Personal information
- Full name: Daniel Barbara
- Date of birth: 12 October 1974 (age 52)
- Place of birth: France
- Position: Forward

Senior career*
Years	Team	Apps	(Gls)
1995–1996	Lourosa	?	(?)
1996–1997	Darlington	4	(1)
1999–2000	Tours FC Monaco	11	(1)
- * Club domestic league appearances and goals

Daniel Barbara (born 12 October 1974) was a French footballer who played as a forward for Darlington in The Football League.
