= Ian Larnach =

English footballer

Personal information
- Full name: Ian James Larnach
- Date of birth: 10 July 1951
- Place of birth: Ferryhill, County Durham, England
- Position: Forward

Youth career
- Darlington

Senior career*
| Years | Team | Apps | (Gls) |
| 1969–1970 | Darlington | 2 | (1) |
- South Shields
- * Club domestic league appearances and goals

Ian James Larnach (born 10 July 1951) is an English former footballer who played as a forward in the Football League for Darlington and in non-league football for South Shields.
