= Norman Cardew =

English footballer

Personal information
- Date of birth: 7 November 1938
- Place of birth: South Shields, England
- Position: Inside forward

Senior career*
Years	Team	Apps	(Gls)
–	South Shields		
1965–1966	Darlington	6	(0)
–	South Shields		
- * Club domestic league appearances and goals

Norman Cardew (born 7 November 1938) is an English former footballer who made six appearances in the Football League for Darlington. An amateur inside forward, he played for home-town club South Shields either side of his season at Darlington.
