= Mike Westgarth =

English footballer

Personal information
- Full name: Michael Hills Westgarth
- Date of birth: 29 July 1908
- Place of birth: Hetton-le-Hole, England
- Date of death: 1972 (aged 63)
- Place of death: County Durham, England
- Position: Outside left

Senior career*
Years	Team	Apps	(Gls)
- Stockton
1931–1932	Darlington	11	(1)
- Shildon
- * Club domestic league appearances and goals

Michael Hills Westgarth (29 July 1908 – 1972) was an English footballer who played as an outside right in the Football League for Darlington.

Westgarth was born in Hetton-le-Hole, County Durham, in 1908. (Note: Westgarth's birth was registered in the Houghton-le-Spring registration district of County Durham, and the 1911 UK Census gives his birthplace specifically as Hetton-le-Hole, Houghton-le-Spring.) The 1911 UK Census records him living in that town with his parents, John George Westgarth, a coal miner, and Mary Alice, and his five surviving siblings.

He played football for Northern League club Stockton, and signed for Third Division North club Darlington in March 1931. He made his debut in the Football League on 28 March, replacing Jack Hill at centre forward for the visit to Chesterfield. He scored his first and what proved to be only League goal in a 4–2 win against local rivals Hartlepools United a week later. By the start of the following season, he was playing on the wing. His Darlington career ended that season, after 11 appearances, and he returned to non-league football with Shildon.

Westgarth died in County Durham in 1972 at the age of 63. (Note: Westgarth's death was registered in the first quarter of 1972 in the Durham Central & South Eastern registration district.)
