= Tommy Charlton =

English footballer

Personal information
- Full name: Thomas Charlton
- Place of birth: [Hexham], England
- Position: Winger

Senior career*
Years	Team	Apps	(Gls)
1908-1909	Darlington		
1909–1913	Stockport County	93	(26)
1913	Burnley	7	(3)
1913–1914	Blackpool	22	(3)
- * Club domestic league appearances and goals

Thomas Charlton was an English professional association footballer who played as a winger.

He began his career with Darlington, but spent the majority of his career with Stockport County, making 93 league appearances and scoring 26 goals in four years. [1911 census shows Thomas Charlton, aged 24 as a Professional Footballer with Stockport County F.C. Census gives his birthplace as Hexham, Durham and his address in 1911 as 10 Bakewell Street, Stockport where he was a boarder with his wife Violet and his son, also called Thomas.

After a short spell with Burnley in 1913, Charlton joined the Clarets' Lancashire neighbours Blackpool later that year. He made his debut for the Seasiders, who still hadn't appointed a full-time manager, on 22 December, in a 2–2 draw with Leeds City at Bloomfield Road. He went on to make a further twenty-two league appearances during the 1913–14 campaign, scoring three goals in the process (including the only goal of the game in Blackpool's visit to Leicester Fosse on Christmas Day). He also started in Blackpool's FA Cup first-round exit at Gillingham on 10 January.
