= Roch Karaa =

Tunisian footballer

Personal information
- Full name: Rochdi Karaa
- Date of birth: 3 April 1964 (age 62)
- Place of birth: Sousse, Tunisia
- Position: Goalkeeper

Senior career*
Years	Team	Apps	(Gls)
1985	Darlington	1	(0)

International career
- Tunisia U21
- * Club domestic league appearances and goals

Rochdi "Roch" Karaa (born 3 April 1964) is a Tunisian former professional footballer who played as a goalkeeper for Darlington.

== Career ==
Born in Sousse, Tunisia, Karaa began his career in his home country, and was capped for the Tunisia under-21 national team. He later moved to England, where he was signed by Fourth Division side Darlington. He made his debut for the club on the final game of the 1984–85 season against Torquay United, becoming the first Tunisian to play in the English Football League. He made no further appearances for the club.

In 2002, Karaa opened a catering company in Morpeth.

Rochdi Karaa is the first and only Tunisian to hold a UEFA A GoalKeeping Licence.
