= Bobby Malt =

English footballer

Personal information
- Full name: Robert Malt
- Date of birth: 4 November 1951 (age 74)
- Place of birth: Ryhope, England
- Position: Centre forward

Youth career
- Leeds United

Senior career*
Years	Team	Apps	(Gls)
1968–1970	Leeds United	0	(0)
1970–1971	Darlington	4	(0)
–	South Shields		
–	Silksworth Colliery		
–	Ryhope Community Association		
- * Club domestic league appearances and goals

Robert Malt (born 4 November 1951) is an English former footballer who played as a centre forward in the Football League for Darlington and in non-league football for clubs including South Shields, Silksworth CW and Ryhope Community Association. He was born in Ryhope, County Durham, attended Ryhope Junior School, and represented Seaham Boys at football before joining Leeds United when he left school, but never played for that club's first team.
