= Joseph Sewell =

English footballer

Personal information
- Full name: Joseph Sewell
- Position: Outside right

Senior career*
Years	Team	Apps	(Gls)
–	Crook Town		
1931–1933	Darlington	11	(0)
- * Club domestic league appearances and goals

Joseph Sewell (active 1931–33) was a footballer who played at outside right in the Football League for Darlington.

Sewell, who played as an amateur, made his debut in January 1932 in a 3–1 defeat at Chester in the Third Division North. He played into the 1932–33 season, and finished his Darlington career with 11 league appearances. He also played for Crook Town.

Sewell married Jenny Henderson at South Hetton, County Durham, in 1933.
