= Herbert McFerran =

English footballer

Personal information
- Full name: Herbert John McFerran
- Date of birth: 1900
- Place of birth: Jarrow, County Durham, England
- Date of death: 1996 (aged 95–96)
- Place of death: London, Ontario, Canada
- Position: Centre forward

Senior career*
Years	Team	Apps	(Gls)
1921–1923	Darlington	4	(3)
1923–19??	Durham City	0	(0)
- * Club domestic league appearances and goals

Herbert John McFerran (1900–1996) was an English footballer who played as a centre forward in the Football League for Darlington. He was also on Durham City's books but never played League football for them.

== Life and career ==
McFerran was born in 1900 in Jarrow, County Durham, the second child of William McFerran, a dry dock clerk, and his wife Mary. By 1911, the family had moved to Hebburn.

He made his Football League debut for Darlington in the 1921–22 season, and remained with the club until 1923. He played four times in the Third Division North, and scored three goals, the first two in a 7–3 defeat at Crewe Alexandra in April 1922, and the third in a 3–2 win against Barrow in September. He went on to play for Durham City, but not in the League.

In 1928, McFerran married Mary Best. He became a marine engineer, and in 1952, he, his wife and their son emigrated to Canada.

McFerran died in London, Ontario, in 1996 and was buried there in Forest Lawn Memorial Gardens.
