= Andy Ripley (footballer) =

English footballer

Personal information
- Full name: Andrew Ian Ripley
- Date of birth: 10 December 1975 (age 50)
- Place of birth: Middlesbrough, England
- Position: Winger

Youth career
- Darlington

Senior career*
Years	Team	Apps	(Gls)
1993–1994	Darlington	2	(0)
–	Peterlee Newtown		
1999–2005	Billingham Synthonia	148	(26)
- * Club domestic league appearances and goals

Andrew Ian Ripley (born 10 December 1975) is an English former footballer who played as a winger in the Football League for Darlington.

Ripley came through the youth system at Darlington, and made his first-team debut as a 17-year-old, on 9 October 1993, as a substitute in a 2–1 defeat at home to Chester City in the Third Division. He made one more substitute appearance in the league, and started in the second round of the Associate Members' Cup, before moving into non-league football, first with Peterlee Newtown. He later spent six seasons with Billingham Synthonia for whom he made nearly 200 appearances in all competitions, of which 148 were made in the Northern League.
