= Neil Smallwood =

English footballer

Personal information
- Full name: Neil Smallwood
- Date of birth: 3 December 1966 (age 59)
- Place of birth: York, England
- Height: 6 ft 1 in (1.85 m)
- Position: Goalkeeper

Youth career
- 1983–1985: York City

Senior career*
Years	Team	Apps	(Gls)
1985–1988	York City	13	(0)
1988–????	Darlington	4	(0)
- Goole Town
- Nestlé Rowntree
1995–????	Pickering Town		
- York Railway Institute
Total		17	(0)
- * Club domestic league appearances and goals

Neil Smallwood (born 3 December 1966) is an English former professional footballer who played as a goalkeeper in the Football League for York City and Darlington, and in non-League football for Goole Town, Nestlé Rowntree, Pickering Town and York Railway Institute.
