= Robert Lowes (footballer) =

English footballer

Personal information
- Full name: Robert Graham Lowes
- Date of birth: 18 February 1902
- Place of birth: High Spen, County Durham, England
- Date of death: 1985 (aged 82–83)
- Place of death: Gateshead, England
- Position: Centre forward

Senior career*
Years	Team	Apps	(Gls)
–	Lintz Colliery		
1928–1929	Darlington	13	(3)
- * Club domestic league appearances and goals

Robert Graham Lowes (18 February 1902 – 1985) was an English footballer who played as a centre forward in the Football League for Darlington.

Lowes was born in High Spen, County Durham, the second child of George Lowes, a stone miner, and his wife Isabella. At the time of the 1911 Census, the family were living in Rowlands Gill. He began his football career with non-league club Lintz Colliery, and scored three goals from thirteen appearances in the Third Division North playing as a centre forward for Darlington in the 1928–29 Football League season.

He died in Gateshead in 1985. (Note: Lowes' death was registered in the first quarter of 1985 in the Gateshead registration district, which roughly equates to the Metropolitan Borough of Gateshead.)
