= Billy Hutchinson (1930s footballer) =

English footballer

Personal information
- Place of birth: Chester-le-Street, England
- Position: Outside left

Senior career*
Years	Team	Apps	(Gls)
- Chester-le-Street Town
1929–19??	Birmingham	0	(0)
1930–193?	Bournemouth & Boscombe Athletic	2	(0)
1931–193?	Leeds United	0	(0)
1932	Darlington	3	(1)
1932–1933	Halifax Town	2	(0)
- * Club domestic league appearances and goals

William L. Hutchinson (active 1930s) was an English footballer who played as an outside left in the Football League for Bournemouth & Boscombe Athletic, Darlington and Halifax Town. He was on the books of Birmingham and Leeds United, without playing league football for either, and began his career with non-league club Chester-le-Street Town.

== Life and career ==
Hutchinson was born in Chester-le-Street, County Durham, and began his football career with his home-town club. From there he joined Football League First Division club Birmingham, but never played for their first team. In 1930, he signed for Bournemouth & Boscombe Athletic of the Third Division South; the Athletic News described him as "a young outside-left from Birmingham, who is expected to develop". Hutchinson played twice in league competition, but was not retained at the end of the season. He "gave a favourable impression" in a trial with Leeds United, "combin[ing] accurate passing with a fair turn of speed".

Hutchinson appeared three times in the Third Division for Darlington. After "making an impressive debut at outside left" in a 1–0 win away to Southport, he opened the scoring away to Mansfield Town, but his side let slip a three-goal lead to the prolific Harry Johnson's second-half hat-trick. He kept his place for the next match, at home to Rotherham United, but the club did not extend his stay, new signing Tom Callaghan being preferred at outside left. He went on to make two appearances – both away wins – in the Third Division North for Halifax Town in January 1933.
