= Kevin Alderson =

English footballer

Personal information
- Full name: Kevin Alderson
- Date of birth: 21 August 1953
- Place of birth: Shildon, County Durham, England
- Position: Winger

Youth career
- –: Darlington

Senior career*
Years	Team	Apps	(Gls)
1970–1971	Darlington	2	(0)
–	Shildon		
- * Club domestic league appearances and goals

Kevin Alderson (born 21 August 1953) is an English former footballer who made two appearances in the Football League playing as a winger for Darlington in the 1970s. He also played non-league football for Shildon.
