= Tommy Simpson (footballer, born 1931) =

Scottish footballer

Personal information
- Full name: Thomas Simpson
- Date of birth: 31 July 1931
- Place of birth: Airdrie, Scotland
- Date of death: October 2015 (aged 84)
- Place of death: Doncaster, England
- Height: 6 ft 1 in (1.85 m)
- Position: Defender

Senior career*
Years	Team	Apps	(Gls)
–	Burnbank Athletic		
1951–1952	St Johnstone	1	(0)
1953–1954	Hamilton Academical	3	(0)
1954	Crusaders		
1954–1955	Dundee United	5	(1)
1955–1956	Canterbury City		
1956–1958	Darlington	4	(0)
–	Weymouth		
- * Club domestic league appearances and goals

Thomas Simpson (31 July 1931 – October 2015) was a Scottish footballer who played as a defender in the Scottish League for St Johnstone, Hamilton Academical and Dundee United, in the English Football League for Darlington, for Irish League club Crusaders, for junior club Burnbank Athletic, and in English non-league football for Canterbury City and Weymouth.
