= Mike Robinson (footballer, born 1968) =

English footballer

Personal information
- Full name: Michael Anthony Robinson
- Date of birth: 30 October 1968 (age 58)
- Place of birth: Sunderland, England
- Position: Full back

Youth career
- Newcastle United

Senior career*
Years	Team	Apps	(Gls)
1987–1988	Newcastle United	0	(0)
1988–1989	Darlington	1	(0)
- * Club domestic league appearances and goals

Michael Anthony Robinson (born 30 October 1968) is an English former footballer who played as a full back in the Football League for Darlington.

He was on the books of Newcastle United without playing for their first team, and joined Darlington of the Football League Fourth Division in July 1988. He made three senior appearances. The first was as a substitute on the opening day of the 1988–89 Football League season in a 4–1 defeat at home to Stockport County. He started the next match, against Doncaster Rovers in the League Cup, and his third and final outing was in January 1989 as Darlington were eliminated by Halifax Town in the Associate Members' Cup.
