= Ken Williamson =

English footballer and cricketer

Personal information
- Full name: Kenneth Williamson
- Date of birth: 7 August 1928
- Place of birth: Norton-on-Tees, England
- Date of death: 9 May 2000 (aged 71)
- Place of death: Stockton-on-Tees, England
- Position: Inside forward

Senior career*
Years	Team	Apps	(Gls)
19??–1952	Bishop Auckland		
1952–1953	Darlington	13	(3)
1953–19??	Crook Town		
- * Club domestic league appearances and goals

Kenneth Williamson (7 August 1928 – 9 May 2000) was an English amateur footballer who played as an inside forward in the Football League for Darlington and in non-league football for Bishop Auckland and Crook Town.

He was on the losing side for Bishop Auckland in the 1951 FA Amateur Cup Final, and on the winning side for Crook Town in 1954, albeit playing only in the drawn match at Wembley Stadium, during which he sustained an ankle injury that kept him out of the two replays.

Williamson was an all-round sportsman. As a cricketer, he played as a right-handed batsman and right-arm medium-pace bowler in the Minor Counties Championship for Durham between 1951 and 1960, and also represented the county at rugby and squash, a sport he went on to coach at Teesside Polytechnic.
