= Tommy Hall (footballer, born 1908) =

English footballer

Personal information
- Full name: Thomas Williamson Sidney Hall
- Date of birth: 15 June 1908
- Place of birth: Middleton St George, County Durham, England
- Date of death: 1973 (aged 64–65)
- Place of death: Darlington, County Durham, England
- Position: Left half

Senior career*
Years	Team	Apps	(Gls)
1929–1931	Darlington	23	(1)
- * Club domestic league appearances and goals

Thomas Williamson Sidney Hall (15 June 1908 – 1973) was an English footballer who played at left half in the Football League for Darlington.

Hall was born in Middleton St George, County Durham, the sixth child of Thomas Williamson Hall, a cab proprietor, and his wife Joanna. He scored once from 23 appearances in the Third Division North for Darlington during the 1929–30 and 1930–31 Football League seasons. He died in 1973 in Darlington, County Durham.
