= Maurice Mason =

English footballer (1927–2008)

Personal information
- Full name: Maurice Mason
- Date of birth: 25 June 1927
- Place of birth: Sedgefield, England
- Date of death: June 2008 (aged 80)
- Place of death: County Durham, England
- Position: Inside forward

Senior career*
Years	Team	Apps	(Gls)
1948–19??	Huddersfield Town	0	(0)
19??–1952	Blackhall Colliery Welfare		
1952–1953	Darlington	3	(0)
1953–19??	Blackhall Colliery Welfare		
- * Club domestic league appearances and goals

Maurice Mason (25 June 1927 - June 2008) was an English footballer who played as an inside forward in the Football League for Darlington.

Mason was born in Sedgefield, County Durham. He signed professionally for Huddersfield Town in 1948, but never played for them in the Football League. By 1950, he was playing for North Eastern League club Blackhall Colliery Welfare. He was a member of the Blackhall team that reached the first round proper of the FA Cup for the first time in the club's history in 1951–52, contributing the opening goal against Scarborough in the final qualifying round match, and scored four times as they beat Ashington 9–2 in the North Eastern League in January 1952. He played three matches in the Third Division North for Darlington in the 1952–53 Football League season before returning to Blackhall, where he played until at least 1954.
