= Lew Nainby =

English footballer

Personal information
- Full name: Lewis John Nainby
- Date of birth: 2 January 1940
- Place of birth: Whitley Bay, England
- Position: Forward

Senior career*
Years	Team	Apps	(Gls)
1958–1959	Sheffield Wednesday	0	(0)
1959–1960	Darlington	3	(1)
- Blyth Spartans
- * Club domestic league appearances and goals

Lewis John Nainby (born 2 January 1940), sometimes referred to as John Nainby, is an English former footballer who played as a forward in the Football League for Darlington. He was on the books of Sheffield Wednesday without playing first-team football for them. He scored seven goals for Blyth Spartans in a Northern Counties League match against Stockton in December 1961.
