= Tom Connaboy =

Scottish footballer (1911–1974)

Personal information
- Full name: Thomas Connaboy
- Date of birth: 10 November 1911
- Place of birth: Straiton, Scotland
- Date of death: 1974 (aged 62–63)
- Height: 5 ft 8 in (1.73 m)
- Position: Inside right

Senior career*
| Years | Team | Apps | (Gls) |
| 19??–1934 | Arniston Rangers | | |
| 1934–1937 | Arbroath | | |
| 1937 | Leith Athletic | | |
| 1937 | Darlington | 1 | (0) |
| 1937–1938 | Alloa Athletic | | |
| 1938–19?? | Bangor City | | |
- * Club domestic league appearances and goals

Thomas Connaboy (10 November 1911 – 1974) was a Scottish footballer who played in the Scottish League for Arbroath, Leith Athletic and Alloa Athletic, in the English Football League for Darlington, in Scottish Junior football for Arniston Rangers, and in the Lancashire Combination for Bangor City. He played mainly at inside right, but also at inside left and wing half.

== Life and career ==
Connaboy was born in 1911 in Straiton, Scotland. He began his football career with junior club Arniston Rangers. After a successful trial with Arbroath in December 1934, in which he played at inside right in the Division Two match against Raith Rovers, he moved into senior football. He played infrequently, and failed to impress the commentators, who suggested his ability was not reflected in his performance. He assisted Arbroath to a second-place finish in his first season, and was retained for the 1935–36 Division One campaign. He was used less in the forward line than at right half: he was reported to have "put up a good show" in that position against Celtic, albeit in a 5–0 defeat, and "The Rover", writing in the Arbroath Herald after Connaboy had left the club, reported that "it looked to many towards last back-end as if he was going to blossom forth as a nifty right-half". His appearances continued sporadically: his first outing of the 1936–37 season was not until December, and in January, "The Rover" suggested that in light of only 24 matches spread over two years with the club, "it is scarcely to be expected that he can be a positive star whenever he is drafted into active service", but that his recent run of games had made a clear improvement. The club's decision to omit his name from their retained list at the end of the season was not entirely popular.

After a trial with English club Wolverhampton Wanderers in August came to nothing, Connaboy played a few games for Leith Athletic in Division Two. It was reported that he had not actually signed for the club, but was considering offers from Airdrieonians and English club Hull City as well as from Leith. In October, he moved to England to join Third Division club Darlington. He played just once, against Halifax Town on 6 November, and was back in Scotland by December. After a spell in Division Two Alloa Athletic, during which he scored against Raith Rovers in a 6–3 loss, he moved into the Lancashire Combination with Bangor City ahead of the 1938–39 season.

Connaboy died in 1974.
