= Danny Groves =

English footballer (born 1990)

Dan Groves
Personal information
- Full name: Daniel Charles Groves
- Date of birth: 10 December 1990 (age 35)
- Place of birth: Darlington, England
- Height: 1.88 m (6 ft 2 in)
- Positions: Defender; midfielder

Team information
- Current team: Hebburn Town

Youth career
- ?–2009: Darlington

Senior career*
Years	Team	Apps	(Gls)
2009–2010	Darlington	16	(0)
2010–2012	Blyth Spartans	53	(2)
2012–2015	Spennymoor Town		
2015-2018	Shildon AFC		
2018-present	Hebburn Town		
- * Club domestic league appearances and goals

Daniel Charles Groves (born 10 December 1990) is an English footballer who plays as a defender or midfielder for Hebburn Town. He is captain of the club.

== Career ==
=== Darlington ===
Groves started his career at Darlington and made his debut appearance for the club as a substitute in the last 13 minutes of the game against Chester City on 2 May 2009. He was released by the club following their relegation from League Two, along with 13 other players.

=== Blyth Spartans ===
In August 2010 Groves signed for Blyth Spartans, making his debut, coming on as a second-half substitute, in the home game against Corby Town on 21 August 2010. Following the release of Stephen Harrison, Groves has become the Spartans' first choice right back. Groves was released by Blyth prior to the 2012–13 season.

=== Spennymoor Town ===
After being released by Blyth, Groves was picked up by Spennymoor Town during the summer of 2012. Groves missed out on going to Wembley with his teammates for the 2013 FA Vase Final after being admitted to hospital with a twisted bowel and appendicitis and was recovering for a few months after a couple of operations. He won the Northern League title in 2014, before departing the club a year later.

=== Shildon ===
Groves signed for Shildon, where he lifted the Northern League in his maiden season at Dean Street. He left the Railway men in 2018.

=== Hebburn Town ===
Groves agreed terms at The Hornets under Scott Oliver, helping the team finish second. He played a vital part as Hebburn Town lifted the 2020 FA Vase and were promoted to the Northern Premier League. Following the transfer of Louis Storey to Gateshead, Groves was appointed club captain in August 2021.
