= Ernie Gray =

English footballer

Personal information
- Full name: Arthur Ernest Gray
- Date of birth: 10 March 1894
- Place of birth: Cleethorpes, England
- Date of death: 1973 (aged 78–79)
- Height: 5 ft 5 in (1.65 m)
- Position: Winger

Senior career*
Years	Team	Apps	(Gls)
1914–1919	Cleethorpes Town		
1919–1920	Grimsby Town	1	(0)
1920–1924	Cleethorpes Town		
1924–1927	Grimsby Town	5	(1)
- * Club domestic league appearances and goals

Arthur Ernest Gray (10 March 1894 – 1973) was an English professional footballer who played as a winger.
