= Les James (footballer) =

English footballer

Personal information
- Full name: Leslie George James
- Date of birth: 3 May 1933
- Place of birth: Hereford, England
- Date of death: 26 March 2014 (aged 80)
- Place of death: Hereford, England
- Position: Outside left

Senior career*
Years	Team	Apps	(Gls)
- Kington Town
1953–1954	Darlington	4	(0)
- * Club domestic league appearances and goals

Leslie George James (3 May 1933 – 26 March 2014) was an English amateur footballer who played as an outside left in the Football League for Darlington. He joined Darlington from Kington Town in May 1953, made his senior debut on the opening day of the 1953–54 season, in a 1–1 draw away to Chesterfield, and played in the next three Third Division North matches.
