= Bill Glasper =

English footballer (1910–1965)

Personal information
- Date of birth: q4 1910
- Place of birth: Middlesbrough, England
- Date of death: q3 1965 (aged 54)
- Place of death: Cleveland, (Note: Glasper's death was registered in the third quarter of 1965 in the Cleveland registration district, which includes such towns as Eston, Guisborough, Redcar, Thornaby-on-Tees and Yarm.) Yorkshire, England
- Height: 5 ft 7 1/2 in (1.71 m)
- Positions: Left half; inside right

Senior career*
Years	Team	Apps	(Gls)
–	South Bank		
1931–1932	Sheffield Wednesday	0	(0)
1932–1933	Mexborough Athletic		
1933–1935	Tranmere Rovers	18	(1)
1935–1937	Darlington	8	(0)
- * Club domestic league appearances and goals

William H. Glasper (q4 1910 – q3 1965) was an English footballer who played at left half or inside right in the Football League for Tranmere Rovers and Darlington. He was on the books of Sheffield Wednesday without representing them in the league, and played for Northern League club South Bank and Midland League club Mexborough Athletic.

== Life and career ==
Glasper was born in 1910 in Middlesbrough, Yorkshire, and played football for Middlesbrough-based Northern League club South Bank before signing for Sheffield Wednesday of the Football League First Division in the 1931–32 season. He never played for the first team, and moved on to Midland League club Mexborough Athletic in December 1932. He had played at left half for South Bank, but Wednesday thought of him as a forward, and Mexborough played him at inside right.

He signed for Tranmere Rovers in 1933, and made 18 appearances in the Third Division during two years with the club. He appeared more regularly in other competitions. He scored Tranmere's equaliser in the 1934 Welsh Cup Final against Bristol City, played on the losing side in the replay, and scored twice in a 6–1 defeat of Southport in the 1935 Northern Section Cup. His only Third Division goal came in a 4–1 win against Darlington in March 1935, and he joined that club at the end of the season. Although he played mainly for the reserves, he was retained for a second season, and finished his Darlington career with eight Third Division appearances without scoring.

Glasper died in 1965 at the age of 54.
