= Kalu N'Goma =

Democratic Republic of the Congo footballer (born 1977)

Personal information
- Full name: Kalusivikako N'Goma
- Date of birth: 3 August 1977 (age 49)
- Place of birth: Kinshasa, Zaire (present-day DR Congo)
- Height: 1.92 m (6 ft 4 in)
- Position: Midfielder

Senior career*
| Years | Team | Apps | (Gls) |
| 2000–2002 | Red Star | | |
| 2002–2004 | Aurillac FCA | | |
| 2004–2005 | Bayonne | 33 | (2) |
| 2005–2006 | Libourne | 33 | (0) |
| 2006–2007 | Darlington | 18 | (1) |
| 2007–2011 | Montceau Bourgogne | | |
| 2011–2014 | AS Beaune | | |

Managerial career
- 2011–2014: AS Beaune (player-manager)
- 2015–2017: Montceau Bourgogne (staff)
- * Club domestic league appearances and goals

Kalusivikako N'Goma, known as Kalu N'Goma (last name also spelled as Ngoma) (born 3 August 1977 in Kinshasa) is a Democratic Republic of the Congo former professional football player. He also holds French nationality.

He has played in the English Football League Two for Darlington F.C.
