= John Thorns =

English footballer

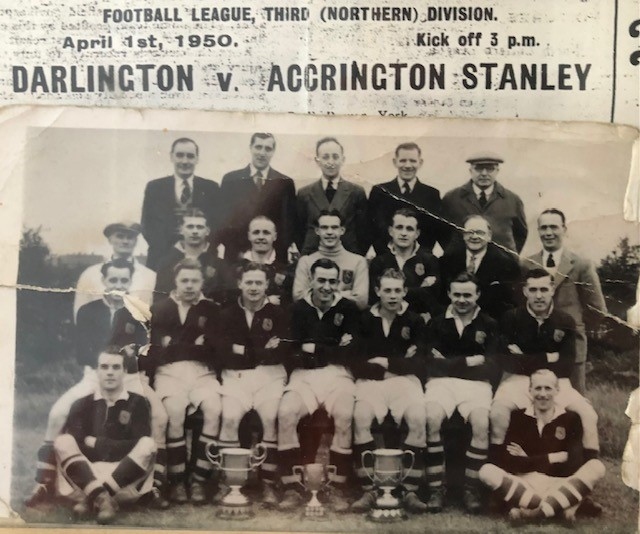
- John William Thorns seated 1st row 3rd from right

Personal information
- Full name: John William Thorns
- Date of birth: 10 July 1928
- Place of birth: Newcastle upon Tyne, England
- Date of death: 1975 (aged 46–47)
- Place of death: Middlesbrough, England
- Position: Outside right

Senior career*
Years	Team	Apps	(Gls)
1949–1950	Darlington	1	(0)
- * Club domestic league appearances and goals

John William Thorns (10 July 1928 – 1975) was an English amateur footballer who played as an outside right in the Football League for Darlington. He appeared only once for the club, in April 1950 in a 2–0 defeat at home to Accrington Stanley in the Third Division North.
