= Paul Cooper (footballer, born 1975) =

English footballer

Personal information
- Full name: Paul Cooper
- Date of birth: 24 December 1975 (age 50)
- Place of birth: Darlington, England
- Position: Midfielder

Youth career
- –: Darlington

Senior career*
Years	Team	Apps	(Gls)
1993–1994	Darlington	1	(0)
- * Club domestic league appearances and goals

Paul Cooper (born 24 December 1975) is an English footballer who played in the Football League for Darlington.
