= Barry Stell =

English footballer (born 1961)

Personal information
- Full name: Barry Stell
- Date of birth: 3 September 1961 (age 65)
- Place of birth: Felling, County Durham, England
- Position: Midfielder

Senior career*
Years	Team	Apps	(Gls)
1979	Sheffield Wednesday	0	(0)
1979–1981	Darlington	9	(0)
–	Esh Winning		
- * Club domestic league appearances and goals

Barry Stell (born 3 September 1961) is an English former footballer who played as a midfielder in the Football League for Darlington. He was on the books of Sheffield Wednesday, without playing first-team football for them, and also played non-league football for Esh Winning.
