= Gary Whetter =

English footballer

Personal information
- Full name: Gary Whetter
- Date of birth: 6 September 1963 (age 63)
- Place of birth: Middlesbrough, England
- Position: Striker

Senior career*
Years	Team	Apps	(Gls)
1983-1986	Crook Town		
1986–1987	Darlington	5	(1)
1987–198?	Billingham Synthonia		
1988–1989	Whitby Town		(11)
- * Club domestic league appearances and goals

Gary Whetter (born 6 September 1963) is an English former footballer who played as a striker in the Football League for Darlington. He also played non-league football for Crook Town, Billingham Synthonia, for whom he scored 6 goals from 18 appearances in all competitions, and Whitby Town.
