= Tom Burnett (footballer) =

English footballer (1913–1986)

Personal information
- Full name: Thomas Burnett
- Date of birth: 9 February 1913
- Place of birth: Leyburn, England
- Date of death: 1986 (aged 72–73)
- Place of death: Newcastle upon Tyne, England
- Height: 5 ft 8 in (1.73 m)
- Position: Full back

Senior career*
Years	Team	Apps	(Gls)
1935–1938	Darlington	16	(0)
- * Club domestic league appearances and goals

Thomas Burnett (9 February 1913 – 1986) was an English footballer who played as a full back in the Football League for Darlington.

== Life and career ==
Burnett was born in 1913 in the Leyburn district of the North Riding of Yorkshire, the son of John Burnett, a woodman on the Bolton estate, and his wife Margaret.

Burnett made his debut for Darlington in the 1935–36 Football League season. Although primarily a full back, he also played as a centre half for Darlington's reserves, and was used in that position for the first team as well, in January 1937 when there were eight enforced changes because of influenza and injuries. He had a run of games at left back at the end of that season, and was retained for 1937–38. After new signing Mike Boyle was injured in October, Burnett came into the league side for the visit of Lincoln City, but was unable to finish the match because of injury. He was offered terms for the 1938–39 season, but turned them down, and was given a free transfer. He finished his Darlington career with 16 appearances in the Third Division North.

Burnett's death was registered in Newcastle upon Tyne in 1986.
