= Stewart Ferebee =

English footballer

Personal information
- Full name: Stewart Raymond Ferebee
- Date of birth: 6 September 1960
- Place of birth: Carshalton, Surrey, England
- Position: Forward

Senior career*
Years	Team	Apps	(Gls)
–	Harrogate Railway Athletic		
1979–1981	York City	13	(0)
1981–1982	Scarborough	0	(0)
1982–1984	Harrogate Town		
1984–1987	Whitley Bay		
1987	Darlington	8	(0)
1987–1988	Halifax Town	12	(0)
–	Harrogate Town		
- * Club domestic league appearances and goals

Stewart Raymond Ferebee (born 6 September 1960) was an English footballer who played in the Football League for York City, Darlington and Halifax Town. A forward, Ferebee also played non-league football for clubs including Harrogate Railway Athletic, Scarborough, Harrogate Town, for whom he scored 49 goals from 173 matches, 40 from 128 in league competition, in two spells with the club, and Whitley Bay, for whom he scored 52 goals from 137 appearances.

He attended Newcastle University.
