= Mike Hunter (footballer) =

English footballer

Personal information
- Full name: Michael Hunter
- Date of birth: 27 May 1948 (age 78)
- Place of birth: Hexham, England
- Position: Forward

Youth career
- –: Blackpool

Senior career*
Years	Team	Apps	(Gls)
1966–1967	Blackpool	0	(0)
1967–1968	Darlington	3	(0)
1968–19??	Sligo Rovers		
- * Club domestic league appearances and goals

Michael Hunter (born 27 May 1948) is an English former footballer who played as a forward in the Football League for Darlington and in the League of Ireland for Sligo Rovers. He was on the books of Blackpool without representing them in the League. Hunter joined Sligo Rovers in August 1968, and played for them until at least 1970.
