= Phil Shute =

English footballer

Personal information
- Full name: Philip Shute
- Date of birth: 15 December 1953
- Place of birth: Darlington, England
- Position: Forward

Senior career*
Years	Team	Apps	(Gls)
- Shildon
1985–1986	Darlington	2	(0)
–	Darlington Cleveland Bridge		
–	Shildon		
- * Club domestic league appearances and goals

Philip Shute (born 15 December 1953) is an English former footballer who played as a forward in the Football League on a non-contract basis for Darlington, and in non-league football for Shildon and Darlington Cleveland Bridge. He was born in Darlington, County Durham.
