= Richard Waters (footballer) =

English footballer

Personal information
- Date of birth: 18 May 1945
- Place of birth: Gateshead, County Durham, England
- Position: Goalkeeper

Senior career*
Years	Team	Apps	(Gls)
- Blyth Spartans
1965	Darlington	2	(0)
–	Gateshead		
- * Club domestic league appearances and goals

Richard E. Waters (born 18 May 1945) is an English former footballer who played as a goalkeeper in the Football League for Darlington, and in non-league football for Blyth Spartans and Gateshead. As a 19-year-old amateur standing in for Ray Snowball, Waters played twice in the Fourth Division in March 1965, in a 2–1 defeat at home to Torquay United and a 3–0 loss away to Chesterfield.
