= Tom Robson (footballer, born 1936) =

English footballer

Personal information
- Full name: Thomas Robson
- Date of birth: 1 February 1936
- Place of birth: Sunderland, England
- Date of death: 1981 (aged 44–45)
- Place of death: Sunderland, England
- Position: Centre half

Youth career
- Sunderland

Senior career*
Years	Team	Apps	(Gls)
1957–1960	Sunderland	5	(0)
1960–1961	Darlington	1	(0)
- Horden Colliery Welfare
- * Club domestic league appearances and goals

Thomas Robson (1 February 1936 – 1981) was an English footballer who played as a centre half in the Football League for Sunderland and Darlington, and in non-league football for Horden Colliery Welfare. He made his league debut for Sunderland on 28 February 1959 in a 1–0 win at home to Huddersfield Town in the Second Division.
