= Mark Davis (footballer) =

English footballer

Personal information
- Full name: Mark Ronald Davis
- Date of birth: 12 October 1969 (age 57)
- Place of birth: Wallsend, England
- Position: Midfielder

Youth career
- Darlington

Senior career*
Years	Team	Apps	(Gls)
1987	Darlington	2	(0)
- * Club domestic league appearances and goals

Mark Ronald Davis (born 12 October 1969) is an English footballer who played as a midfielder in the Football League for Darlington. In late February 1987, at the age of 17 years and 4 months, Wallsend-born youth trainee Davis made substitute appearances in the Third Division matches at home to York City and Bristol City; both matches were drawn.
