= Ken Sykes =

English footballer

Personal information
- Full name: Kenneth Sykes
- Date of birth: 29 January 1926
- Place of birth: Darlington, England
- Date of death: 27 April 2008 (aged 82)
- Place of death: Darlington, England
- Position: Forward

Senior career*
Years	Team	Apps	(Gls)
1946–1947	Darlington	6	(2)
1947–1949	Middlesbrough	0	(0)
1949–1950	Hartlepools United	1	(0)
–	Murton Colliery Welfare	0	(0)
- * Club domestic league appearances and goals

Kenneth Sykes (29 January 1926 – 2008) was an English footballer who played as a forward in the Football League for Darlington and Hartlepool United. He was also on Middlesbrough's books without playing League football for the club, and also played non-league football for Murton Colliery Welfare.

== Life and career ==
Sykes was born in Darlington, County Durham, where he attended Albert Road School and played for its football team. He worked as a railwayman during the Second World War, and signed for Darlington in 1944 at the age of 18. He also joined the Air Training Corps, playing football for Durham ATC against other counties and for the North-East Command team that won the ATC National Shield; he scored twice in the final.

When the Football League resumed after the war, Sykes, described as having "scored prolifically in the reserves", was in Darlington's first team. He scored in a 3–3 draw with Chester on 14 September 1946, and again two days later, in a 4–1 defeat at Hartlepools United. He played six matches in the Third Division North before signing for First Division club Middlesbrough. He never played for their first team, and after one match back in the Third Division for Hartlepools United in April 1950, a 1–0 home defeat against Darlington, he moved into non-league football with Murton Colliery Welfare. When he was 28, he gave up football.

Sykes died in Darlington in 2008 at the age of 82.
