= Ray Finnigan =

English footballer

Personal information
- Full name: Raymond William Finnigan
- Date of birth: 22 January 1947
- Place of birth: Wallsend, England
- Position: Full back

Youth career
- –: Newcastle United

Senior career*
Years	Team	Apps	(Gls)
1965–1966	Newcastle United	0	(0)
1966–1968	Darlington	11	(0)
1968–19??	Gateshead		
- * Club domestic league appearances and goals

Raymond William Finnigan (born 22 January 1947) is an English former footballer who played in the Football League for Darlington. A full back, Finnigan began his career as an apprentice with Newcastle United, but never played for them in the league, and went on to play non-league football for Gateshead. He later worked in the motor trade.
