= Ken Solan =

English footballer

Personal information
- Full name: Kenneth Solan
- Date of birth: 13 October 1948
- Place of birth: Middlesbrough, England
- Date of death: 23 November 1971 (aged 23)
- Place of death: Middlesbrough, England
- Position: Striker

Youth career
- 19xx–1968: Middlesbrough

Senior career*
Years	Team	Apps	(Gls)
1968–1971	Middlesbrough	0	(0)
1968	→ Hartlepool United (loan)	6	(1)
1969	→ Darlington (loan)	8	(1)
Total		14	(2)
- * Club domestic league appearances and goals

Kenneth Solan (13 October 1948 – 23 November 1971) was an English professional footballer who made a total of 14 appearances in the Football League, before dying in a car crash at the age of 23.

== Career ==
Solan began his career as a youth player at hometown club Middlesbrough, and spent loan spells at Hartlepool United and Darlington. Solan never made a league appearance for Middlesbrough.

== Death ==
Solan died in a car crash on 23 November 1971, at the age of 23.
