= Barney McCabe =

English footballer (1903–1963)

Personal information
- Full name: Thomas Bernard McCabe
- Date of birth: 15 January 1903
- Place of birth: Middleton St George, County Durham, England
- Date of death: 1963 (aged 59–60)
- Position: Inside right

Senior career*
Years	Team	Apps	(Gls)
1928	Darlington	1	(0)
1928–1929	Ferryhill Athletic		
1929	Newcastle United	0	(0)
1929–1930	Spennymoor United		
1930–1932	York City	20	(10)
1932–1933	Wigan Athletic		
1933–1934	Wrexham	5	(0)
1934–1935	Burton Town		
1935–1936	Worcester City		
1936–1937	Stourbridge		
1937–1938	Heevans		
- * Club domestic league appearances and goals

Thomas Bernard "Barney" McCabe (15 January 1903 – 1963) was an English professional footballer who played as an inside right. He made appearances in the English Football League for Darlington, York City and Wrexham.
