= Willie O'Brien =

English footballer

Personal information
- Full name: William O'Brien
- Date of birth: 26 January 1929
- Place of birth: Middlesbrough, England
- Date of death: 2015 (aged 85–86)
- Place of death: Canada
- Height: 6 ft 1 in (1.85 m)
- Position: Centre half

Youth career
- –: Middlesbrough

Senior career*
Years	Team	Apps	(Gls)
1947–1948	Leicester City	0	(0)
1950–1951	Darlington	2	(0)
- * Club domestic league appearances and goals

William O'Brien (26 January 1929 – 2015) was an English footballer who played in the Football League for Darlington. A centre half born in Middlesbrough, O'Brien began his football career as a junior with his hometown club, Middlesbrough F.C., and was on the books of Leicester City for the 1947–48 season before serving in the Army. He joined Darlington in February 1950, but did not make his first-team debut for more than a year, when he replaced the injured Geoff Stone on 17 March 1951 for a 4–1 defeat at home to Bradford City. He kept his place for the next Third Division North match – an even heavier defeat, this time away to Hartlepools United – but that was his final appearance.
