= Joe Dumighan =

English footballer

Personal information
- Full name: Joseph Dumighan
- Date of birth: 25 September 1938 (age 88)
- Place of birth: Quebec, England
- Position: Forward

Youth career
- –: Mackays S.C.
- –: Sunderland

Senior career*
| Years | Team | Apps | (Gls) |
| 1955–1958 | Sunderland | 0 | (0) |
| 1958–1959 | Darlington | 4 | (1) |
| – | Horden Colliery Welfare | | |
| – | South Shields | | |
- * Club domestic league appearances and goals

Joseph Dumighan (born 25 September 1938) is an English former footballer who played in the Football League as a forward for Darlington.

Dumighan was born in Quebec, County Durham. As a youngster, he played for the works team of Mackay's carpet factory in Durham before joining Sunderland. He never played for their first team, and moved on to Darlington. After four appearances and one goal in the Fourth Division, he moved on to Horden Colliery Welfare and South Shields of the North Eastern League.

Dumighan played cricket at County League level, and retained an involvement with football as a scout for Leeds, then Darlington then for 20 years at Sunderland retiring during 2016.
