= Jimmy Lyske =

Northern Irish footballer (1932–1974

Personal information
- Full name: James Herbert Alexander Lyske
- Date of birth: 7 October 1932
- Place of birth: Portadown, Northern Ireland
- Date of death: December 1974 (aged 42)
- Place of death: Yeovil, England
- Position: Full back

Youth career
- –: Portadown BC

Senior career*
Years	Team	Apps	(Gls)
19??–1957	Glenavon		
1957–1958	Sunderland	0	(0)
1958–1959	Darlington	16	(0)
1959–1960	Yeovil Town		(0)
- * Club domestic league appearances and goals

James Herbert Alexander Lyske (7 October 1932 – 11 or 12 December 1974) was a Northern Irish footballer who played as a full back in the Irish Football League for Glenavon, in the English Football League for Darlington, and for Southern League club Yeovil Town. He was on the books of Sunderland without playing for them in the League.

Lyske played four times for Ireland Schools in 1947 and represented Northern Ireland youth in 1951.

Lyske died in Yeovil District Hospital in December 1974 after collapsing in the street; he was 42.
