= Mike Sanderson (footballer) =

British footballer

Personal information
- Full name: Michael Sanderson
- Date of birth: 26 October 1966
- Place of birth: West Germany
- Position: Midfielder

Youth career
- Hartlepool United

Senior career*
Years	Team	Apps	(Gls)
1985–1986	Darlington	1	(0)
–	Guisborough Town		
–	Billingham Town		
- * Club domestic league appearances and goals

Michael Sanderson (born 26 October 1966) is a former football midfielder who played in the Football League for Darlington on a non-contract basis. He began his career as a trainee with Hartlepool United, and also played non-league football for Billingham Town and Guisborough Town.

Sanderson made his Darlington debut on 3 March 1985, standing in for regular left back Peter Johnson in a 7–0 defeat of Halifax Town in the Associate Members' Cup. He played once in the Third Division, replacing Steve Tupling for the visit to Notts County on 6 May 1986; Darlington lost 5–0.
