= Michael Carter (footballer, born 1980) =

English footballer

Personal information
- Full name: Michael David Carter
- Date of birth: 13 November 1980
- Place of birth: Darlington, England
- Position: Forward

Senior career*
Years	Team	Apps	(Gls)
1998–2000	Darlington	1	(1)
2000–2001	Spennymoor United		
2001	Leiftur	16	(2)
2001–2002	Whitby Town		
2002–2003	West Auckland Town		(10)
2003–2004	Whitley Bay		
2004–2009	Darlington Railway Athletic		
2009–	Darlington Cleveland Bridge		
- * Club domestic league appearances and goals

Michael David Carter (born 13 November 1980) is an English former footballer who played in the Football League for Darlington, in the Icelandic 1.deild for Leiftur, and for numerous non-league clubs in the north-east of England. He played as a forward.

Carter was born in Darlington, and represented County Durham schools at under-15 level. He came through the youth system of his hometown club, Darlington F.C., and scored on his only appearance in the Football League, in a 3–0 win at home to Scarborough in November 1998. He played once more, as a substitute in the FA Cup defeat at Manchester City, before moving on to non-league football with Spennymoor United. He then spent the 2001 season in the Icelandic 1. deild with Leiftur before returning to non-league football in the north-east of England. His clubs included Whitby Town, West Auckland Town, Whitley Bay, Darlington Railway Athletic, and Darlington Cleveland Bridge.
