= Paul Fisher (footballer) =

English footballer

Personal information
- Full name: Paul Fisher
- Date of birth: 19 January 1951
- Place of birth: Mansfield, England
- Position: Full back

Senior career*
Years	Team	Apps	(Gls)
1969–1970	Huddersfield Town	0	(0)
1970–1971	Darlington	3	(0)
–	Stevenage Athletic		
- * Club domestic league appearances and goals

Paul Fisher (born 19 January 1951) is an English former footballer who played in the Football League for Darlington. A full back, Fisher began his senior career with Huddersfield Town, but never played for them in the league, and went on to play non-league football for Stevenage Athletic.

Fisher made three senior appearances for Darlington: he made his debut in the starting eleven for the opening match of the 1970–71 Football League season, a 1–1 draw away to Barrow in the Fourth Division, and played twice more, both in the League in September 1970.
