= Dave Gallant =

English footballer

Personal information
- Full name: David Gallant
- Date of birth: 12 October 1949
- Place of birth: Middlesbrough, England
- Date of death: 1997 (aged 47–48)
- Place of death: Middlesbrough, England
- Position: Forward

Youth career
- Whinney Banks Y.C.
- Leeds United

Senior career*
Years	Team	Apps	(Gls)
1966–1968	Leeds United	0	(0)
1968	→ Darlington (loan)	1	(0)
- * Club domestic league appearances and goals

David Gallant (12 October 1949 – 1997) was an English footballer who played in the Football League for Darlington.

Gallant was born in Middlesbrough, which was then in the North Riding of Yorkshire. He was playing football for his local youth club in the Whinney Banks area when he was signed Leeds United by Don Revie. Described as a "tall, elegant player", Revie had high hopes for his future. Gallant turned professional with Leeds, but suffered badly with homesickness. In 1968, he spent time on loan at Darlington – based some 15 miles (24 km) from his home town – and appeared once in the Fourth Division. After that he left Leeds, returned home and played only in local football. Gallant died in Middlesbrough in 1997. (Note: Gallant's death was registered in December 1997 in the Middlesbrough registration district.)
