= George McDiarmid =

Scottish footballer

Personal information
- Date of birth: 1880
- Place of birth: Gartsherrie, Scotland
- Date of death: 1946 (aged 65–66)
- Position: Centre-half

Senior career*
| Years | Team | Apps | (Gls) |
| 1899–1900 | Cambuslang Rangers | | |
| 1900–1901 | Nottingham Forest | 4 | (0) |
| 1901 | Northampton Town | | |
| 1901–1903 | Airdrieonians | 28 | (0) |
| 1903–1905 | Grimsby Town | 64 | (1) |
| 1905–1907 | Glossop | 50 | (3) |
| 1907 | Clyde | 2 | (0) |
| 1907–1908 | Grimsby Town | 7 | (0) |
| 1908–19?? | Darlington | | |
- * Club domestic league appearances and goals

George McDiarmid (1880–1946) was a Scottish professional footballer who played as a centre-half.
