= George Mullen =

Astronomer

George Mullen is an astronomer who co-authored several peer-reviewed articles with Carl Sagan. He, along with Sagan, pointed out the faint young Sun paradox. In addition to studying the early Earth atmosphere, he studied the atmosphere of Jupiter.
