= Joe Roddom =

English footballer (1924–1988)

Personal information
- Full name: Joseph Norman Roddom
- Date of birth: 16 May 1924
- Place of birth: Spennymoor, England
- Date of death: 1988 (Note: Roddom's death was registered in August 1988 in the Chester East registration district in Cheshire.) (aged 64)
- Place of death: Chester East, England
- Height: 5 ft 9 in (1.75 m)
- Position: Wing half

Senior career*
Years	Team	Apps	(Gls)
–	Blyth Spartans		
1948–1950	Chesterfield	0	(0)
1950–1951	Darlington	6	(0)
–	South Shields		
- * Club domestic league appearances and goals

Joseph Norman Roddom (16 May 1924 – 1988) is an English former footballer who played as a wing half in the Football League for Darlington.

Roddom played professionally for North Eastern League club Blyth Spartans in the early part of the 1947–48 season, while serving in the Royal Air Force. He joined Second Division club Chesterfield in January 1948 in exchange for £500 and the forward John Allison. He played for Chesterfield's reserves in the Central League, but never for the first team. Despite being placed on their retained list in 1950, he was transferred to Darlington in June 1950. He made six Third Division North appearances for Darlington, then moved on to South Shields, where he played until at least the 1954–55 season.
