= Bob Graham (footballer, born October 1900) =

English footballer (1900–1965)

Personal information
- Full name: Robert Henry Graham
- Date of birth: 12 October 1900
- Place of birth: Middlesbrough, England
- Date of death: 1965 (aged 64–65)
- Position: Wing-half

Senior career*
Years	Team	Apps	(Gls)
1923–1924	Middlesbrough	0	(0)
1924–1926	Darlington	5	(0)
1926–1930	Wrexham	126	(2)
1930–1932	Halifax Town	39	(0)
1932	Workington		
Total		170	(2)
- * Club domestic league appearances and goals

Robert Henry Graham (12 October 1900 – 1965) was an English footballer who played in the Football League for Ashington, Lincoln City and Middlesbrough.
