= Fred Leeder =

English footballer

Personal information
- Full name: Frederick Leeder
- Date of birth: 15 September 1936
- Place of birth: New Hartley, England
- Position: Full back

Youth career
- Seaton Delaval

Senior career*
Years	Team	Apps	(Gls)
1955–1958	Everton	1	(0)
1958–1960	Darlington	21	(0)
1960–1962	Southport	63	(0)
–	Runcorn		
- * Club domestic league appearances and goals

Frederick Leeder (born 15 September 1936) is an English former footballer who played as a full back in the Football League for Everton, Darlington and Southport. He also played non-league football for Runcorn. The Daily Express report of his only League match for Everton, on 11 January 1958 against Chelsea, described how "Brabrook, with some mazy dribbles, made it a nightmare debut for 19-year-old Everton left back Fred Leeder."
