= John Tennant (footballer, born 1939) =

English footballer

Personal information
- Full name: John Graham Tennant
- Date of birth: 1 August 1939
- Place of birth: Darlington, England
- Date of death: December 1985 (aged 46)
- Place of death: County Durham, England
- Position: Goalkeeper

Senior career*
Years	Team	Apps	(Gls)
1957–1959	Darlington	8	(0)
1959	Chelsea	0	(0)
1959–1962	Southend United	2	(0)
1962–1964	Ashford Town	50	(0)
–	Canterbury City		
- * Club domestic league appearances and goals

John Graham Tennant (1 August 1939 – December 1985) was an English footballer who played as a goalkeeper in the Football League for Darlington and Southend United.

Tennant was born in Darlington, County Durham, in 1939. He made his debut for Darlington F.C. as a 17-year-old, in a 1–0 defeat away to Halifax Town in the Fourth Division on 19 April 1957. He played twice more in what remained of the season, and made a further five appearances early in the 1957–58 season, conceding 14 goals. Given a free transfer by Darlington, Tennant joined up with First Division club Chelsea in August 1959 for a month's trial, during which he made five appearances for their Metropolitan League team. The trial came to nothing, and in October he joined Southend United. In three years with the club, he played only twice in the Third Division and twice in the League Cup. He then moved into Southern League football with Ashford Town, and Canterbury City.

Tennant died in County Durham in 1985 at the age of 46.
