= Billy Coyle (footballer) =

English footballer (1926–2011)

Personal information
- Full name: William Coyle
- Date of birth: 24 October 1926
- Place of birth: [Penshaw, County Durham, England
- Date of death: May 2011 (aged 84)
- Place of death: Sunderland, England
- Height: 6 ft 1 in (1.85 m)
- Position: Centre half

Senior career*
Years	Team	Apps	(Gls)
1943 – 1949	West Auckland Town		
1949–1950	Darlington	16	(0)
- * Club domestic league appearances and goals

William Coyle (24 October 1926 – May 2011) was an English amateur footballer who played as a centre half in the Football League for Darlington. He previously played non-league football for West Auckland Town.
