= Tom Kelly (footballer, born 1919) =

English footballer

Personal information
- Full name: Thomas William Kelly
- Date of birth: 22 November 1919
- Place of birth: Darlington, England
- Date of death: 1970 (aged 50–51)
- Height: 5 ft 10 1/2 in (1.79 m)
- Positions: Wing half; defender

Youth career
- –: Deneside Juniors

Senior career*
Years	Team	Apps	(Gls)
1937–1951	Darlington	157	(2)
1951–19??	York City	0	(0)
–	Horden Colliery Welfare		
- * Club domestic league appearances and goals

Thomas William Kelly (known throughout his playing career as Bill or Billy (22 November 1919 – 1970)) was an English footballer who made 157 appearances in the Football League for Darlington either side of the Second World War. He played at centre half, right half or right back. After leaving Darlington, he was on the books of York City, without representing that club in league competition, and also played for non-league club Horden Colliery Welfare.
