= John Ward (1920s footballer) =

English footballer

John Ward was an English professional footballer of the 1920s. Born in Birtley, he joined Gillingham from Darlington in 1925 and went on to make two appearances for the club in The Football League. He left to join Fatfield Albion in 1926.

He signed for Bradford City from Fatfield in October 1927. He made 5 league appearances for the club, before being released in June 1928.

== Sources ==
- Frost, Terry (1988). Bradford City A Complete Record 1903-1988. Breedon Books Sport. ISBN 0-907969-38-0.
