= Steve McMahon (footballer, born 1970) =

Scottish footballer

Personal information
- Full name: Steven McMahon
- Date of birth: 22 April 1970
- Place of birth: Glasgow, Scotland
- Positions: Defender; forward

Senior career*
Years	Team	Apps	(Gls)
1983–1985	Ferguslie United		
1991–1993	Swansea City	2	(0)
1993–1994	Carlisle United	2	(0)
1994	→ Barrow (loan)		
1994	Cowdenbeath	2	(0)
1994–1995	Foshan		
1995–1996	Partick Thistle	1	(0)
1996	Darlington	10	(1)
1996–1997	Clydebank	21	(3)
- * Club domestic league appearances and goals

Steven McMahon (born 22 April 1970) is a Scottish former footballer who played in the Football League for Swansea City, Carlisle United and Darlington, in the Scottish League for Cowdenbeath, Partick Thistle and Clydebank, in China for Foshan, and in the Northern Premier League for Barrow (on loan from Carlisle).
