= Kevin Maddick =

English footballer

Personal information
- Full name: Kevin Andrew Maddick
- Date of birth: 18 September 1974
- Place of birth: Newcastle upon Tyne, England
- Position: Forward

Youth career
- Middlesbrough

Senior career*
Years	Team	Apps	(Gls)
1992–1994	Darlington	3	(0)
–	Seaham Red Star		
- * Club domestic league appearances and goals

Kevin Andrew Maddick (born 18 September 1974) is an English former footballer who played as a forward in the Football League for Darlington. He began his football career as a youngster with Middlesbrough, and went on to play non-league football for Seaham Red Star.
