= List of Darlington F.C. players (25–99 appearances) =

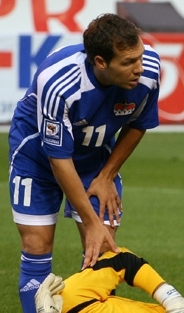
Liechtenstein international midfielder Franz Burgmeier, the club's most capped player

Darlington Football Club, an English association football club based in Darlington, County Durham, was founded in 1883. They entered the FA Cup for the first time in 1885–86, were founder members of the Northern League in 1889, turned professional in 1908 and joined the North Eastern League, which they won in 1913 and 1921. The latter win preceded election to the Football League as members of its newly formed Third Division North. Runners-up in their first season, Darlington were Northern Section champions three years later, thus winning promotion to the Second Division. Their 15th-place finish in 1926 remains their best League performance, and they were relegated back to the Third Division the following year. After 68 years of continuous membership, they were relegated from the Football League in 1988–89. Having made an immediate return as Conference champions, they remained in the League until 2010, when they again dropped into the Conference. After Darlington failed to exit administration in a manner acceptable to the Football Association, that body treated it as a new club, required it to change its name (to Darlington 1883), and placed its team in the Northern League, the ninth tier of English football, for the 2012–13 season. Five years later, the FA approved the club's request to resume its traditional name.

The club's first team have competed in numerous nationally organised competitions, and all players who have played in between 25 and 99 such matches, either as a member of the starting eleven or as a substitute, are listed below. Each player's details include the duration of his Darlington career, his typical playing position while with the club, and the number of games played and goals scored in domestic league matches and in all senior competitive matches. Where applicable, the list also includes the national team for which the player was selected, and the number of senior international caps he won.

== Introduction ==
Of the more than 350 men who made 25 career appearances for Darlington in national competitions but fell short of the 100 mark, several hold club records. Jason de Vos was the first to play senior international football while a Darlington player, and Franz Burgmeier made most senior international appearances, with seven for Liechtenstein during the 2008–09 season. At 15 years 318 days, Curtis Main became Darlington's youngest Football League debutant when he entered the League Two visit to Peterborough United on 3 May 2008 as a second-half substitute. The sale of de Vos to Dundee United for £400,000 in 1998 generated the club's record transfer fee received, and the record for fee paid, of £100,000, was set in 2006 when Julian Joachim was signed from Boston United and equalled the following year with the purchase of Pawel Abbott from Swansea City.

Others made an important contribution to the club despite relatively few appearances in national competition. Dick Healey's career was coming to an end by the time the club was elected to the Football League, but he was their top scorer with 41 goals as they won the North-Eastern League title in 1913 and captained the club to their second title in 1921, as well as scoring four goals in as many matches for the England amateur team and representing the Amateur XI in the 1913 FA Charity Shield. Dick Jackson played in 26 FA Cup matches while player-manager of Darlington either side of the First World War, and George Brown – a former England international and three-time League winner with Huddersfield Town – had a spell as player-manager in the 1930s. Lol Morgan, Mick Tait and Martin Gray went on to manage the club: Morgan managed the team to promotion from the Fourth Division in 1965–66, and Gray led the team to three promotions in four seasons after taking over as manager in 2012. Marco Gabbiadini was the only player with fewer than 100 League appearances to be voted by supporters into a "Dream Team" as part of the 2003 Farewell to Feethams celebrations (when the club left their long-time home).

Other players took part in significant matches in the history of the club. Tommy Barbour, Percy Sutcliffe, Alf Dolphin and Arthur Wolstenholme played in Darlington's first match in the Football League, a 2–0 win at home to Halifax Town on 27 August 1921. Tommy Moran scored twice and created two other goals, one for Ron Harbertson, as Darlington eliminated Chelsea, League champions only three seasons earlier, in the fourth round of the 1957–58 FA Cup to progress to the last 16 of the competition for only the second time in their history. Gary Coatsworth scored the goal that confirmed Darlington as winners of the 1989–90 Football Conference title. John McReady, Gary Smith and Michael Smith played in Darlington's last match in the Football League, against Dagenham & Redbridge on 8 May 2010. After Tommy Wright struck the bar in the 120th minute of the 2011 FA Trophy Final, substitute Chris Senior was first to the rebound to head Darlington's winning goal. Jamie Chandler was man of the match, and the team included seven other men listed here.

Still others earned their notability elsewhere. In Jack Beby's time as manager of AEK – the club's website dubs him the "great reformer" – he led the team to successive victories in the Greek Cup in 1949 and 1950. Tom Burlison was an active trade unionist who became deputy general secretary of the GMB, treasurer of the Labour Party and, as Baron Burlison of Rowlands Gill, was the first former professional footballer to enter the House of Lords, where he was a Government whip.

== Key ==
- The list is ordered first by number of appearances in total, then by number of League appearances, and then if necessary by date of debut.
- Appearances as a substitute are included.
- Statistics are correct up to and including 1 July 2024, the first day of the 2024–25 season. Where a player left the club permanently after this date, his statistics are updated to his date of leaving.

Positions key
Pre-1960s		1960s–	
GK	Goalkeeper		
FB	Full back	DF	Defender
HB	Half back	MF	Midfielder
FW	Forward		

Player
Players marked * were registered for the club as at the date specified above.
Players with name in italics and marked † were on loan from another club for the duration of their Darlington career. The loaning club is noted in the Notes column, and sourced to Neil Brown's Player Database, to the English National Football Archive, or individually.
Position
Playing positions are listed according to the tactical formations that were employed at the time. Thus the change in the names of defensive and midfield positions reflects the tactical evolution that occurred from the 1960s onwards.
Club career
Club career is defined as the first and last calendar years in which the player appeared for the club in any of the competitions listed below.
League appearances and League goals
League appearances and goals comprise those in the Football League (1921–1989 and 1990–2010), the Football Conference (1989–1990 and 2010–2012) and the National League (2016–present). Appearances in the 1939–40 Football League season, abandoned after three matches because of the Second World War, are excluded. (Note: For matches up until the end of 1999–2000: Tweddle (2000), pp. 15, 23–110.; For 2000–01 to 2009–10: "Clubs: Darlington". English National Football Archive. Select season required via dropdown menu, then Season players tab.; For 2010–11 and 2011–12: League: "Club statistics". Darlington F.C. Archived from the original on 17 November 2015. Select season and statistic required via dropdown menus.; For 2010–11 FA Cup and FA Trophy: Match reports linked from "Fixtures 2010/2011 season". Darlington F.C. Archived from the original on 17 November 2015.; For 2011–12 FA Cup and FA Trophy: Stoddart, Craig (10 December 2011). "Quakers' hold on the Trophy is over". The Northern Echo. Darlington. Archived from the original on 20 December 2022.; Walker, Martin (29 October 2011). "Darlington 1 Hinckley United 1". Darlington F.C.; "Hinckley United vs. Darlington 3–0". Soccerway. Perform Group. Archived from the original on 8 July 2023.; For 2013–14 FA Trophy: "Ossett Town v. Darlington". darlofc.co.uk.; "Buxton v. Darlington". darlofc.co.uk.; "Darlington v. Buxton". darlofc.co.uk.; For 2014–15 FA Cup and FA Trophy: "Goals and appearances". Darlington 1883. Archived from the original on 29 May 2015.; For 2015–16 FA Cup and FA Trophy: "Darlington v Hyde United (FA Cup 1Q)". Darlington 1883. Archived from the original on 2 April 2016.; "Darlington v Mossley (FA Trophy)". Darlington 1883. Archived from the original on 2 April 2016.; Stoddart, Craig (14 November 2015). "Disappointment for Darlington with defeat in FA Trophy – and White sent off again". The Northern Echo. Darlington. Archived from the original on 8 July 2023.; For 2016–17: "Goals and appearances 2016–17". Darlington 1883. Archived from the original on 25 May 2017.; For 2017–18: "Goals and appearances Season 2017–18". Darlington F.C. Archived from the original on 2 May 2018.; For 2018–19 onwards, except where sourced below: "Darlington FC: Squad 2018/2019". Soccerway. Perform Group. Select season and competition required via dropdown menu.; For 2018–19 cup appearances: "Statistics: Season 2018–2019". Darlington F.C. Archived from the original on 28 April 2019.; For 2019–20 FA Cup 2nd and 3rd qualifying rounds and FA Trophy qualifying round: Simpson, Ray (21 September 2019). "Quakers win first FA Cup tie in five years". Darlington F.C. Archived from the original on 23 September 2019.; Simpson, Ray (5 October 2019). "Tyrone and Justin put Quakers through". Darlington F.C. Archived from the original on 6 October 2019.; Simpson, Ray (23 November 2019). "Sub Justin scores the winner". Darlington F.C. Archived from the original on 7 January 2021.; For 2020–21 FA Cup 2nd and 3rd qualifying rounds: Simpson, Ray (3 October 2020). "Quakers win penalty shootout to go through in Cup". Darlington F.C. Archived from the original on 8 November 2022.; Simpson, Ray (13 October 2020). "Early Liddle goal sets up Quakers goal spree". Darlington F.C. Archived from the original on 13 April 2023.; For 2021–22 FA Cup 2nd qualifying round: Simpson, Ray (18 September 2021). "Quakers held to a goalless draw in FA Cup". Darlington F.C. Archived from the original on 20 September 2021.; Simpson, Ray (21 September 2021). "Quakers knocked out of Cup by lucky goal". Darlington F.C. Archived from the original on 24 October 2021.; For 2022–23 FA Cup 2nd and 3rd qualifying rounds: "Becky's hat trick puts Quakers into the next round". Darlington F.C. 17 September 2022. Archived from the original on 20 September 2022.; Simpson, Ray (1 October 2022). "Quakers beaten by second half goal at Hyde". Darlington F.C. Archived from the original on 7 October 2022.; For 2023–24 FA Cup 2nd and 3rd qualifying rounds: "Emirates FA Cup Second Qualifying Round – Darlington 3–1 Workington AFC". Football Web Pages. Archived from the original on 11 October 2023.; Simpson, Ray (30 September 2023). "Scarborough go through with late penalty". Darlington F.C. Archived from the original on 11 October 2023.)
Total appearances and Total goals
Total appearances and goals comprise those in the Football League (including play-offs), Football Conference, National League, FA Cup, Football League Third Division North Cup, Football League Cup, Associate Members' Cup/Football League Trophy, FA Trophy and Conference League Cup. Matches in wartime competitions are excluded.
International selection
Countries are listed only for players who have been selected for international football. Only the highest level of international competition is given, except where a player competed for more than one country, in which case the highest level reached for each country is shown.

== Players with 25 to 99 appearances ==
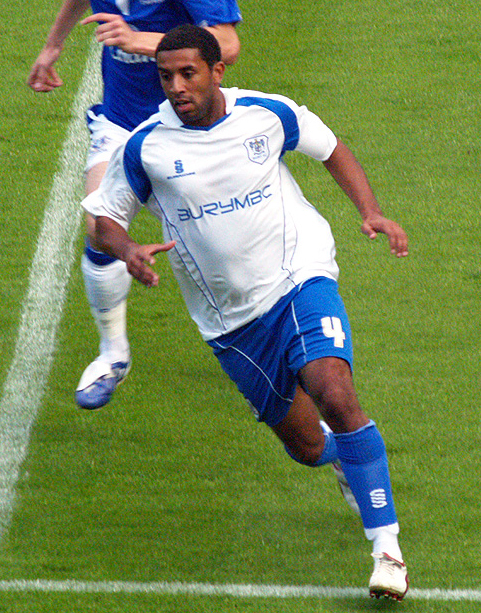
Simon Johnson played for England U20 at the 2003 Toulon Tournament

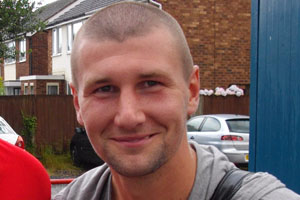
Tommy Wright returned for a second spell with Darlington after their relegation to the Conference and helped them win the 2011 FA Trophy Final.

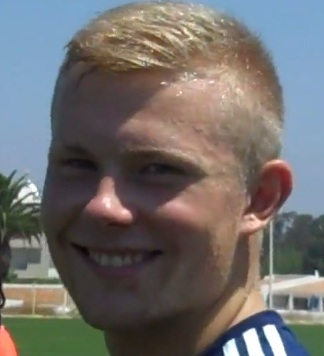
Curtis Main was Darlington's youngest ever Football League player.

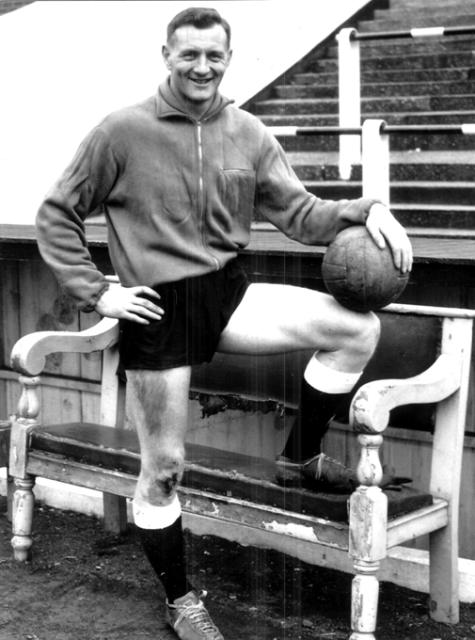
Jimmy O'Neill won 17 senior international caps for the Republic of Ireland in the 1950s.

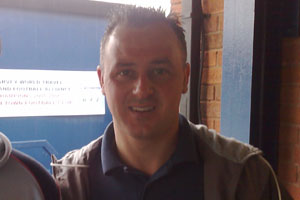
Darren Roberts was Darlington's top league goalscorer in 1996–97 and 1998–99.

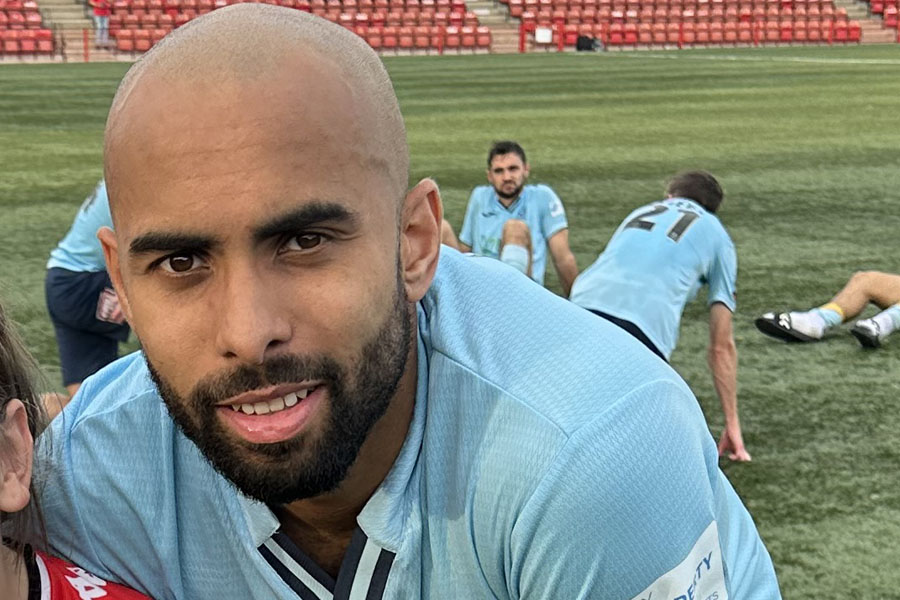
Jacob Hazel played in the 2023 CONCACAF Gold Cup for Saint Kitts and Nevis while a Darlington player.

Table of players, including playing position, club statistics and international selection
Player	Pos	Club career	League		Total		International selection	Refs
Player	Pos	Club career	Apps	Goals	Apps	Goals	International selection	Refs
Ricky Ravenhill	MF	2007–2009	88	6	99	6	—	
Jack Lambert	FW	2019–2020; 2021–2023; 2024–2025	88	21	99	27	—	(Note: Scunthorpe United) (Note: Kidderminster Harriers)
Don Ratcliffe	MF	1966–1967	86	12	99	17	—	
George Wardle	HB	1951–1954	95	6	98	6	—	
Peter Skipper	DF	1980–1982	91	4	98	7	—	
Bert Burridge	HB	1922–1926	92	7	96	7	—	
Mick Wright	DF	1969–1973	89	0	96	0	—	
Dave Edgar	FW	1933–1936	88	20	96	22	—	
Ken Parkinson	GK	1936–1939	87	0	96	0	—	
David Speedie	FW	1980–1982	88	21	95	22	Scotland	
Steve O'Shaughnessy	MF	1992–1994	88	2	95	2	Wales youth	
Marco Gabbiadini	FW	1998–2000	82	47	95	52	England B	
Alan Ogley	GK	1975–1977	80	0	95	0	English schools	
Colin Blant	DF	1974–1976	89	0	94	0	—	
Kallum Griffiths *	DF	2021–present	86	2	94	2	—	
Carl Airey	FW	1984–1986	75	28	94	34	—	
Brian Close	DF / MF	2004–2007	83	0	93	0	Northern Ireland U21	
Harry Yates	FW	1950–1952	91	29	92	29	—	
Neil Hague	DF / MF	1977–1979	80	4	92	0	England youth	
Albert Quinn	FW	1948–1951	86	43	91	44	—	
Mick Tait	MF	1990–1992	79	2	91	2	—	
Micky Cummins	MF	2006–2008	79	10	91	0	Republic of Ireland U21	
Bryan Conlon	FW	1964–1967	75	27	91	35	—	
Harry Wilson	DF	1980–1983	85	0	90	0	England youth	
Colin Tinsley	GK	1958–1961	79	0	90	0	—	
Rob Purdie	MF	2007–2009	79	6	90	6	England semi-pro	
David Currie	FW	1986–1988	76	33	90	36	—	
Denis Howe	DF	1951–1954	88	1	89	1	—	
Gordon Jones	FB	1973–1975	85	5	89	5	England U23	
Alex Purver	MF	2021–2023	81	3	89	3	—	
Paul Olsson	MF	1994–1996	76	8	88	12	—	
Julian Joachim	FW	2006–2008	76	13	87	16	England U21	
Tommy Wright	FW	2006–2008; 2010–2011	75	21	87	24	England U20	
Kevin Stonehouse	FW	1987–1989	72	20	87	24	—	
Harvey Saunders	FW	2017–2019	82	12	86	12	—	(Note: Fleetwood Town)
Phil Turnbull	MF	2015–2018	81	1	86	1	—	
Joey Hutchinson	DF	2003–2006	79	0	86	0	—	
John Middleton	FW	1933–1935	77	22	86	25	—	
Brian Honour	MF	1982–1984	74	4	86	7	—	
Harry Holdcroft	GK	1928–1931	83	0	85	0	England	
Mark Beck	FW	2016–2017; 2022–2023	77	34	85	37	Scotland U19	
Jack Beby	GK	1934–1936	74	0	84	0	—	
Bobby Cummings	FW	1965–1968	74	43	84	46	—	
Gary Smith	MF	2009–2011	71	2	84	6	—	
Mitch Cook	DF / MF	1984–1985; 1991–1992	70	8	84	8	—	
Gary Chapman	FW	1993–1995	74	9	83	9	—	
Aaron Brown	DF	2010–2012	70	2	83	2	—	
Martin Gray	MF	1999–2001	66	0	83	0	—	
Jim Keers	FW	1952–1955	74	15	82	15	—	
Bill Scott	FB	1933–1935	73	0	82	0	—	
Steve Tutill	DF	1997–2000	70	0	82	1	English schools	
Robbie Blake	FW	1995–1997	68	21	82	23	—	
Dave Syers	MF	2016–2018	75	18	81	18	—	
Stan Webb	FW	1974–1976	74	21	81	23	—	
Gregg Blundell	FW	2007–2009	71	11	81	13	England semi-pro	
Ken Allison	FW	1963–1966	74	39	80	40	—	
Harry Charlton	MF	1979–1981	72	4	80	5	—	
Charles Allan	FB	1932; 1935–1937	69	1	80	1	—	
Simon Betts	MF	2001–2003	69	1	80	1	—	
Ken Bower	FW	1946–1949	75	35	79	37	—	
Josh Gillies	FW	2016–2018	75	19	79	19	England C	
Lloyd Maitland	MF	1977–1979	71	6	79	6	—	
Mike Boyle	FB	1937–1939	74	3	78	3	—	
John Logan	HB	1935–1937	65	5	78	5	—	
Joe McAninly	FW	1937–1939	72	7	77	7	—	
Harry Clarke	FW	1945–1947; 1947–1949; 1952–1953	70	47	76	51	—	(Note: Content sourced to the English National Football Archive because of inconsistency or typographical error in Tweddle's Definitive Darlington)
Tommy Moran	FW	1956–1958	70	13	76	16	—	
Adriano Moke	MF	2022–2024	70	0	76	0	—	
Joe Turner	GK	1957–1960	68	0	76	0	—	
Ashley Nicholls	MF	2002–2004	67	6	76	7	English schools	
Simon Johnson	FW	2005–2007	66	9	76	10	England U20	
Jamie Chandler	MF	2009; 2010–2012	66	4	76	6	England U19	(Note: Sunderland)
Gary Gill	MF	1989–1992	64	9	76	11	—	
Tim Gilbert	DF / MF	1982–1984	65	3	75	3	—	
Johnny Spuhler	FW	1954–1956	67	19	74	21	English schools	
Ken Murray	FW	1950–1953	70	19	73	21	—	
Tom Ruddy	FW	1925–1928	66	37	73	43	—	
Paul Campbell	MF	1998–2003	61	6	73	8	—	
Percy Sutcliffe	HB	1914–1923	53	0	73	0	—	
David Corner	DF	1989–1991	56	9	73	16	England U20	
George Luke	MF	1961–1963	68	11	72	11	—	
Ernie Price	HB	1949–1951	69	0	71	0	—	
Jamie Crumley	GK	1924–1926	66	0	71	0	—	
George Hurst	FW	1930–1933	63	21	71	24	—	
Jack Saunders	HB	1946–1948	67	0	70	0	—	
Neil Austin	DF	2007–2009	62	5	70	5	England U20	
Jacob Hazel	FW	2022–2023	62	21	70	24	Saint Kitts and Nevis (5)	
Harry Kirk	MF	1967–1969	61	7	70	8	—	
Bobby Sinclair	FW	1946–1948	68	11	69	11	—	
Harry Smith	HB / FB	1937–1939	65	0	69	0	—	
Ron Harbertson	FW	1957–1958; 1961	63	23	69	30	—	
Curtis Main	FW	2008–2011	61	5	69	7	—	
Tony Carss	MF	1995–1997	57	2	69	3	—	
Ronnie Steel	FW	1949–1952	66	5	68	6	—	
Les Robson	FW	1953–1955	66	19	68	20	—	
Albert Harris	FW	1937–1939	60	7	68	9	—	
Jason Kennedy	MF	2008–2009	59	7	68	9	—	
John Craggs	FB	1983–1984	54	0	68	0	England youth	
Richard Hope	DF	1997–1998	63	1	67	1	—	
Alun Armstrong	FW	2004–2005; 2006–2007	61	11	67	13	—	
Ben Liddle	MF	2022–2024	61	7	67	7	—	
Mike Pollitt	GK	1994–1995	55	0	67	0	—	
Marc Bridge-Wilkinson	FW	2010–2012	55	15	67	17	—	(Note: Carlisle United)
Johnny Dowson	FW	1952–1954	65	11	66	11	—	
Don Ball	DF	1979–1981	60	2	66	2	—	
Gary Brown	DF	2014–2015; 2015–2018	55	6	66	6	—	
Bobby Noble	DF	1975–1977	54	3	66	3	—	
Jack Connors	HB	1948–1952	65	0	65	0	—	
Joe Little	FW	1925–1927	62	13	65	14	—	
Chris Evans	DF	1985–1987	58	1	64	1	—	
Harry Brown	FW	1932–1934	57	17	63	17	—	
Nick Pickering	MF	1991–1993	57	7	63	7	England	
David McGurk	DF	2001–2006	56	6	63	6	—	
Jassem Sukar	DF	2022–2023	55	1	63	1	—	
Leon Scott	MF	2013–2018	49	0	63	0	—	
Gordon Galley	FW	1949–1952	61	12	62	12	—	
Andrew Nelson *	FW	2018–2019; 2021; 2023–present	57	15	62	15	—	(Note: Barnsley)
Maurice Peddelty	MF	1970–1972	56	1	62	3	—	
Mark Ford	MF	2001–2002	57	9	61	9	England U21	
Alex Storey	DF	2019–2022	44	1	61	2	—	
Adam Campbell	FW	2019–2021	43	19	61	22	England U19	
Ron Forster	FW	1956–1959	57	4	60	5	—	
Jack Brooks	FB	1926–1929	54	0	60	0	—	
Harry Lees	FW	1927–1929	54	21	60	24	—	
Neil Aspin	DF	1999–2000	50	0	60	0	—	
David Barton	DF	1983–1984	49	3	60	4	—	(Note: Newcastle United)
Luke Trotman	DF	2017–2019	56	0	59	0	England C	
Bobby Whitehead	DF	1962–1964	53	0	59	0	—	
Carl Shutt	FW	1997–1999	53	9	59	9	—	
Tony Isaacs	MF	1992–1994	51	2	59	2	—	
Peter Cartwright	MF	1983–1984	50	5	59	7	—	
Drew Coverdale	DF / MF	1989–1992	48	4	59	5	—	
Gary Hyde	MF	1988–1990	47	3	59	6	—	
Jesper Hjorth	FW	1999–2001	45	7	59	7	Denmark U21	
Bill Allison	FB	1932–1934	52	0	58	0	—	
Tommy Clish	GK	1955–1957	52	0	58	0	—	
Lee Nogan	FW	1999–2000	49	6	58	9	Wales	
John McReady	MF	2010–2012	56	3	57	3	—	
Adam Rundle	MF	2002; 2011–2012	55	5	57	5	—	
Jim French	FW	1953–1955	52	8	57	8	—	
Joe Kendrick	FB	2004–2006	52	1	57	1	Republic of Ireland U21	
Kaine Felix	MF	2022–2023	52	5	57	5	—	(Note: For the visit to AFC Telford United on 1 November 2022, Soccerway lists the originally declared lineup, with Felix on the bench; however, Jake Lawlor was injured in the warm-up and replaced in the starting eleven by Felix, who should therefore have one league appearance more than listed by Soccerway.)
Phil Bonnyman	MF	1987–1989	50	5	57	5	—	
Mario Dorner	FW	1997–1999	49	13	57	15	—	
Neil Robinson	DF	1988–1990	45	1	57	2	—	
Graeme Aldred	DF	1984–1986	44	0	57	1	—	
Ken Felton	DF / FW	1967–1970	52	7	56	8	—	
Len Green	FB	1956–1961	50	0	56	0	—	
John Green	DF	1985–1986	45	2	56	2	—	
Craig Russell	FW	1999; 2003–2005	52	4	54	4	—	(Note: Manchester City)
Nathan Cartman	FW	2015–2017	48	7	54	9	—	
Peter Duffield	FW	1999–2000	47	14	54	15	—	
David Stockdale	GK	2006–2008	47	0	54	0	England squad	
Omar Holness	MF	2019–2021	38	4	54	7	Jamaica (1)	
Tommy Knox	GK	1931–1933	48	0	52	0	—	
Gary Pearson	DF	2001–2004	48	3	52	3	—	
Malcolm Scott	HB	1961–1963	47	2	52	2	—	
Jason de Vos	DF	1996–1998	44	5	52	6	Canada (3)	
Harry Walker	GK	1936–1938	50	0	51	0	—	
Bobby Bulch	HB	1958–1959	45	1	51	1	—	
Gary Bannister	FW	1995–1996	41	10	51	11	England U21	
Paul Newell	GK	1996–1997	41	0	51	0	—	
Jim Scarborough	FW	1951–1954	49	15	50	15	—	
Brian Redfearn	FW	1959–1961	48	16	50	17	—	
Andy Welsh	FB	1937–1938	46	0	50	0	—	
Chris Hughes	MF	2003–2005	45	2	50	2	—	
Josh Gray	MF	2008–2011	45	1	50	1	—	
George Brown	FW	1936–1938	44	12	50	13	England	
Darren Collier	GK	1993–1994	44	0	50	0	—	
Danny Mellanby	FW	2001–2003	44	8	50	8	—	
Alex Smith	DF	1974–1975	43	0	50	0	—	
Gavin Worboys	FW	1994–1996	41	8	50	13	—	
David McAughtrie	DF	1987–1989	39	0	50	0	—	
Reuben Vine	FW	1929–1931	48	12	49	13	—	
Tony McFadden	FW	1981–1983	47	10	49	10	—	
Mike Peacock	GK	1960–1962	46	0	49	0	—	
Steve Ball	MF	1992–1994	42	3	49	3	—	
Carlos Logan	MF	2005–2006	42	4	49	6	—	
Tony France	FW	1961–1963	47	9	48	9	—	
Charles Coates	FW	1932–1934	46	9	48	9	—	
Jonjo Dickman	MF	2005–2006	46	3	48	3	—	
Danny Rose †	MF	2021–present	44	1	47	1	England C	(Note: Grimsby Town)
Tom Platt *	MF	2023–present	44	0	47	1	—	
Tommy Reynolds	FW	1954–1956	43	6	47	6	—	
Doug Fletcher	FW	1958–1959	43	13	47	13	—	
Liam Marrs	DF	2016–2017	43	0	47	0	—	
Stephen Bell	MF	1987–1988	40	3	47	3	England youth	
Gary Worthington	FW	1987–1989	40	15	47	15	England youth	
Lee Brydon	DF	1996–1998	40	0	47	0	English schools	
Louis Laing	DF	2019–2020	36	0	47	0	England U19	
Bill Tulip	FW	1956–1957	44	34	46	36	—	
Bill Atkins	FW	1973–1975	44	12	46	12	—	
Akpo Sodje	FW	2005–2006	43	9	46	9	—	(Note: Huddersfield Town)
Tim Ryan	FB	2007–2009	42	1	46	1	England semi-pro	
Charlie Stubbs	FW	1945–1948	41	17	46	18	—	
Ian Banks	MF	1994–1995	39	1	46	1	—	
Nigel Batch	GK	1988–1990	38	0	46	0	—	
Shelton Martis	DF	2005–2006	42	2	45	2	Netherlands Antilles; Curaçao	
Pawel Abbott	FW	2007–2009	42	17	45	17	Poland U21	
Hugh Dow	FB	1932–1934	40	1	45	1	—	
Mark Forster	FW	1984–1985	38	13	45	16	—	
Francis Wallace	FW	1928–1931	43	7	44	7	—	
Arthur Childs	HB	1924–1928; 1934–1936	42	6	44	7	—	
Jock Archibald	GK	1927–1928	41	0	44	0	—	
Roger Wicks	MF	1981–1983	41	4	44	4	—	
Tim Parkin	DF	1992–1993	40	2	44	2	—	
Albert Brallisford	FW	1936–1937	39	26	44	30	—	
Mark Outterside	DF	1987–1988	38	0	44	0	—	
Joe Scott	FW	1926–1928	43	12	43	12	—	
John McGuire	FW / HB	1928–1930	42	7	43	7	—	
Jimmy Maddison	FW	1949–1950	41	7	43	7	—	
Terry Poole	HB	1959–1961	41	3	43	4	—	
Tom Elliott	MF	2018–2019	41	3	43	3	—	
Jordan Nicholson	MF	2018–2019	41	11	43	11	—	
Bob Gregg	FW	1926–1928	40	21	43	21	—	
Tom Feeney	FW	1938–1939	40	22	43	25	—	
Jim Turney	FW	1948–1950	40	3	43	3	—	
Toby Lees *	DF	2023–present	40	2	43	3	—	
Cameron Salkeld *	MF	2023–present	40	9	43	9	—	
Len Fielden	GK	1931–1934	39	0	43	0	—	
Matthew Armstrong	HB	1936–1939	38	2	43	2	—	
Neil Heaney	MF	1999–2000	36	5	43	5	England U21	
Jordan Watson	DF	2016–2017; 2019–2021	35	0	43	0	Northern Ireland U19	
Michael Liddle	DF	2019–2021	29	1	43	2	Republic of Ireland U21	
Steve Harper	MF	2001–2002	40	1	42	1	—	
Ryan Bowman	FW	2011–2012	40	10	42	11	—	
Guy Wharton	HB	1948–1950	39	2	42	2	—	
Paul Cross	DF	1993–1994	39	2	42	3	—	
Clyde Wijnhard	FW	2004–2005	39	15	42	15	—	
Bernie Slaven	FW	1994–1995	37	7	42	9	Republic of Ireland	
David Brightwell	DF	2001–2002	36	0	42	0	—	
Tom Portas	MF	2014–2018	32	0	42	0	—	
Justin Donawa	MF	2019–2020	31	6	42	11	Bermuda (5)	
Chris Hunter	DF	2013–2017	27	0	42	0	—	
Billy Race	FW	1926–1927	40	8	41	8	—	
Martin Smith	FW	2006–2008	38	5	41	9	England U21	
Kevin Dos Santos	FW	2021–2022	38	4	41	4	—	
Junior Mondal	MF	2021–2023	38	3	41	3	—	
Mike Astbury	GK	1986–1987	38	0	40	0	—	
Derek Weddle	FW	1962–1964	37	10	40	11	—	
Mark Dobie	FW	1992–1993	36	8	40	11	—	
Dennis Fidler	MF	1966–1968	34	3	40	5	—	
Tyrone O'Neill †	DF	2019; 2020–2021; 2022	33	10	40	13	—	(Note: Middlesbrough)
Murdoch McKenzie	FW	1925–1926	37	17	39	17	—	
Jake Cassidy	FW	2021–2022	37	5	39	5	Wales U21	
Michael Price	GK	2003–2004	36	0	39	0	—	
Kevin Burgess	DF	2007; 2015–2017	36	4	39	4	—	
Kris Taylor	MF	2011–2012	36	0	39	0	—	
Mark Sunley	DF	1991–1994	35	0	39	0	—	
Gary Bennett	DF	1998–2000	34	4	39	5	—	
Craig James	DF	2003–2004; 2006–2007	33	1	39	1	—	
David Duke	DF	2005–2006	33	1	39	1	—	
Archie Stephens	FW	1989–1990	33	6	39	7	—	
John Wright	HB	1937–1939	37	4	38	4	—	
Cliff Chadwick	FW	1947–1948	37	5	38	5	—	
John Clacher	HB	1937–1938	36	2	38	2	—	
Ben Burley	FW	1938–1939	35	7	38	8	—	
Adrian Webster	MF	2004–2006	35	1	38	1	New Zealand (5)	
Franz Burgmeier	MF	2008–2009	35	2	38	2	Liechtenstein (7)	
Mark Samways	GK	1998–2000	34	0	38	0	—	
Jimmy O'Neill	GK	1964–1965	32	0	38	0	Republic of Ireland	
David Moore	DF	1988–1989	30	1	38	2	—	
Dick Healey	FW	1912–1914; 1919–1923	21	5	38	20	England amateur	
Gavin Liddle	DF	1982–1983	37	0	37	0	—	
Michael Smith	FW	2010–2011	37	6	37	6	—	
Paddy Wrightson	FW	1929–1930	36	16	37	16	—	
David Ferguson	DF	2012; 2017	36	5	37	5	England C	
Greg Taylor	DF	2011	35	2	37	2	England C	
Ben O'Hanlon	DF	2018–2019	35	0	37	0	England U18	
Gordon Morritt	GK	1973–1974	34	0	37	0	—	
Ian Juryeff	FW	1992–1993	34	6	37	7	—	
Alf Dolphin	FW	1921–1922	33	3	37	3	—	
Bob Johnson	FW	1932–1933	33	15	37	17	—	
Keith Hutchinson	FB	1945–1949	31	0	37	0	—	
Patrick Collins	DF	2006–2007	31	0	37	0	England U20	
Ron Hewitt	FW	1950–1951	36	3	36	3	Wales	
Fred Laycock	FW	1929–1930	35	14	36	14	—	
David Wheater	DF	2007; 2022–2023	34	3	36	3	England U21	
Lol Morgan	DF	1964–1965	31	0	36	0	—	
Alan Smith	DF	1986–1989	31	1	36	1	—	
Gary Twynham	MF	1996–1997	31	3	36	3	—	
Hugh Foulkes	FB	1938–1939	35	1	35	1	Wales	
Bobby Dodds	HB	1946–1949	35	1	35	1	—	
Doug Robson	DF	1963–1965	34	0	35	1	—	
Dominic Collins	DF	2017–2018	34	0	35	0	—	
Simon Ainge	FW / DF	2018–2019	33	4	35	4	England C	
Alan Dowson	DF	1992–1993	32	0	35	0	—	
Mark Sheeran	FW	2001–2004	32	6	35	7	—	
Jack O'Donnell	FB	1924–1925	30	0	35	0	—	
Michael Trotter	MF	1990–1991	29	2	35	2	—	
Chris Senior	FW	2010–2011	29	4	35	7	—	
Neville Chapman	DF	1967–1969	32	0	34	0	—	
Jeremy Roberts	GK	1987	29	0	34	0	England youth	
Billy Walsh	HB	1954–1955	28	4	34	5	—	
Paul Robinson	FW	1995–1998	26	3	34	4	—	
Aman Verma †	MF	2010–2011	26	4	34	7	—	(Note: Leicester City)
Jimmy Ferguson	GK	1962–1963	32	0	33	0	—	
Reg Chester	FW	1937–1938	31	10	33	11	—	
Reece Styche	FW	2017–2018	31	16	33	18	Gibraltar (3); England C	
Tommy Barbour	FB	1921–1922	29	0	33	0	—	
James Grieve	FW	1931–1933	29	13	33	1	—	
Guylain Ndumbu-Nsungu	FW	2005–2006; 2008	29	13	33	14	—	
Lawrie Pearson	DF	1993–1994	28	4	33	4	—	
Dave Woodcock	MF	1985–1986	27	2	33	2	—	
Robin Hulbert	MF	2008–2009	27	2	33	2	England youth	
Chris Moore	MF	2010–2011; 2013	25	1	33	3	—	
Stuart Elliott	DF	2000–2001	24	0	33	4	—	
Luke Charman	FW	2020–2022	22	12	33	19	—	
James Mellon	FB	1924–1928	31	0	32	0	—	
Reg Siddle	FW	1930–1933	31	8	32	8	—	
Norman Tapken	GK	1947–1948	31	0	32	0	—	
Geoff Stone	HB	1950–1951	31	0	32	0	—	
Des Fawcett	GK	1926–1928	30	0	32	0	—	
Barry Hutchinson	FW	1966	30	14	32	14	—	
Arthur Wolstenholme	FW	1921–1922	29	17	32	17	—	
Joe Mellan	DF	1924–1928	31	0	32	0	—	
John Ince	GK	1933–1934	29	0	32	0	—	
Eric Johnstone	MF	1965–1966	26	9	32	9	—	
Gary Coatsworth	DF	1989–1991	25	3	32	3	—	
Des Lancaster	FW	1958–1959	31	18	31	18	—	
John Kirk	FW	1951–1952	30	4	31	4	—	
Chris Penman	GK	1963–1964	30	0	31	0	—	
Bill Thompson	DF	1968–1970	30	5	31	5	—	
Ralph Phillips	DF	1961–1962	29	2	31	2	—	
Billy Curley	DF	1963–1965	28	1	31	1	—	
Jeff Wealands	GK	1971–1972	28	0	31	0	—	
Fred Smith	FW	1935–1936	27	8	31	9	—	
Stan Watson	DF	1958–1959	27	0	31	0	—	
Ian Davidson	HB	1967–1968	27	0	31	0	—	
Gary Hinchley	DF	1986–1988; 1992	27	1	31	1	—	
Tommy Atkin	FW	1934–1936	26	3	31	3	—	
Phil Taylor	MF	1978–1980	26	2	31	2	—	
Pete Jameson	GK	2014–2017	22	0	31	0	—	
Eric Probert	MF	1978–1979	21	0	31	0	England youth	
Harold Plummer	FB	1930–1933	30	0	30	0	—	
John Maughan	GK	1925–1927	28	0	30	0	—	
Alf Milner	FW	1948–1949	28	5	30	6	—	
Peter Bell	FW	1922; 1930–1931	27	5	30	5	—	
Anthony Peacock	MF	2005–2006	27	0	30	0	—	
Jimmy Moran	FW	1962–1963	26	6	30	6	—	
David Poole	MF	2008–2009	26	1	30	1	—	
Sean Reid	FW	2019–2021	23	3	30	3	—	
Josh Heaton	DF	2017–2018; 2019	29	1	29	1	—	
Jonny Maddison	GK	2018–2019	28	0	29	0	—	
Jimmy Dunn	FB	1959–1960	27	0	29	0	—	
Phil Robinson	MF	1969–1970	27	4	29	4	—	
Fred Hopkin	FW	1931–1932	26	2	29	2	—	
Tom Burlison	HB	1964–1965	26	2	29	3	—	
Josh Falkingham	MF	2016–2017	26	1	29	1	—	
John McGrath	FW	1958–1959	25	6	29	9	—	
Garry Haire	MF	1984–1986	25	2	29	2	—	
John Campbell	FW	2011	24	5	29	5	—	
Chris Elliott	GK	2019–2020	24	0	29	0	—	
Mark Kilty	DF	2000–2002	23	1	29	1	—	
Curtis Fleming	DF	2004–2005	27	0	28	0	Republic of Ireland	
Ron Ward	GK	1956–1957	26	0	28	0	—	
Bill Smith	FW	1963–1964	26	7	28	9	—	
John Peachey	FW	1975–1976; 1979	26	9	28	10	—	
James Caton	MF	2017–2018	26	1	28	1	English schools	
Evan Edwards	FW	1928–1929	25	3	28	3	Wales amateur	
Ernie Adams	GK	1972–1973	25	0	28	0	—	
Liam Hardy	FW	2016–2017	25	8	28	9	—	
David Rowson	MF	2006–2007	24	2	28	2	Scotland U21	
Jeff Smith	MF	2009–2010	24	0	28	0	—	
Dave Wakefield	MF	1983–1984	22	0	28	0	—	
Tommy Johnston	FW	1951–1952	27	9	27	9	—	
Tadhg Purcell	FW	2010; 2011	27	10	27	10	—	(Note: Northampton Town)
Norman Callender	HB	1946–1948	26	1	27	1	—	
Chris Leonard	DF	1951–1953	26	0	27	0	—	
Alex Forsyth	FW	1952–1953	26	7	27	7	—	
Dennis Windross	HB	1961–1962	25	4	27	4	—	
Ian McDonald	MF	1970–1971	25	3	27	3	—	
Billy Yeats	FW	1973–1974	25	7	27	7	—	
Keith Coleman	DF	1979–1980	25	0	27	0	—	
Graeme Lee	DF	2011–2012	24	1	27	1	—	
James McGiffen	FW	1927–1929	23	4	27	4	—	
David Geddis	FW	1990	22	3	27	3	England B	
John Agnew	FW	1954–1956	25	4	26	4	—	
Adam Bartlett	GK	2017	25	0	26	0	England C	
Mitchell Curry	FW	2023–2024	25	5	26	5	—	
Jimmy O'Neill	FW	1967–1968	24	4	26	4	Northern Ireland	
Alex Henshall	MF	2018–2019	24	0	26	0	England U17	
Harry Houlahan	FW	1954–1955	23	8	26	10	—	
Arthur Marsh	DF	1974–1975	23	1	26	1	—	
Keith Granger	GK	1988	23	0	26	0	—	
Jake Cooper †	DF	2021; 2023	23	3	26	3	—	(Note: Rotherham United) (Note: Altrincham)
Harry Harrison	GK	1928–1929	22	0	26	0	—	
Paul Clayton	FW	1988–1989	22	3	26	5	—	
Simon Brown †	GK	2008	22	0	26	0	—	(Note: Brentford)
Malcolm Poskett	FW	1985–1986	21	4	26	5	—	
Kirk Jackson	FW	2001	21	1	26	1	England C	
Darren Holloway	DF	2006–2007	21	1	26	1	England U21	
Dick Jackson	FB / HB	1908–1912	0	0	26	1	—	
Alan Spence	FW	1960–1962	24	11	25	11	England youth	
Alan Duffy	MF	1973–1974	24	0	25	0	England youth	
John Williams	MF	2000–2001	24	5	25	5	—	
Adolfo Gregorio	MF	2004–2005	24	2	25	2	United States U23	
Paul Terry	MF	2010–2011	24	2	25	2	—	
Tommy Dawson	FW	1936–1938	23	3	25	3	—	
Ashley Fickling †	DF	1992–1993; 1993; 1998	23	0	25	0	English schools	(Note: Sheffield United)
Stuart Whitehead	DF	2002–2003	23	0	25	0	—	
John Hannah	FW	1984	22	8	25	9	—	
John Stanger	FW	1936–1937	21	5	25	7	—	
Ken Ellis	DF	1979–1980	21	0	25	0	—	
Danny Hone †	DF	2010	21	1	25	1	—	(Note: Lincoln City)
Richie Foran †	FW	2007–2008; 2008–2009	21	5	25	5	Republic of Ireland U21	(Note: Southend United)
Billy Clarke †	FW	2008	20	8	25	9	Republic of Ireland U21	(Note: Ipswich Town)

== Footnotes ==
Player statistics include games played while on loan from:

== Sources ==
- Joyce, Michael (2004). Football League Players' Records 1888 to 1939. Nottingham: SoccerData. ISBN 978-1-899468-67-6.
- Rollin, Glenda; Rollin, Jack, eds. (2010). Sky Sports Football Yearbook 2010–2011. Headline. ISBN 978-0-7553-6107-6.
- Tweddle, Frank (2000). The Definitive Darlington F.C. Nottingham: SoccerData. ISBN 978-1-899468-15-7.
