= Ian McDonald =

Ian McDonald may refer to:

- Ian McDonald (civil servant) (1936−2019), Ministry of Defence spokesman during the Falklands War
- Ian McDonald (musician) (1946−2022), member of King Crimson, 1969−1970, and Foreigner, 1977−1979
- Iain Matthews (born 1946), previously known as Ian McDonald, member of Fairport Convention
- Ian Hamilton McDonald (1923−2019), Australian cricketer
- Ian McDonald (footballer, born 1951) (born 1951), Scottish football midfielder with Darlington
- Ian McDonald (footballer, born 1953), English football midfielder with York City and Aldershot, among others
- Ian McDonald (footballer, born 1958) (born 1958), Scottish football midfielder with Partick Thistle and Greenock Morton, among others
- Ian McDonald (Guyanese writer) (1933−2026), Caribbean-born writer
- Ian McDonald (British author) (born 1960), British science fiction novelist
- Ian Donald Roy McDonald (1898−1920), World War I flying ace
- W. Ian McDonald (1933−2006), New Zealand neurologist, academic, and specialist in multiple sclerosis

Ian MacDonald may refer to:

- Ian MacDonald (1948−2003), pen-name for British music critic Ian MacCormick
- Ian MacDonald (footballer) (born 1953), Scottish football defender with St. Johnstone and Carlisle, among others
- Ian MacDonald (oceanographer), American Biological Oceanographer, Florida State University
- Ian MacDonald (actor) (1914−1978), American actor and producer
- Ian MacDonald (Canadian politician), former public school teacher and former Mayor of Charlottetown, Prince Edward Island, Canada
- Ian Macdonald (Australian politician, born 1945), Australian federal politician
- Ian Macdonald (Scottish politician) (born 1934), Scottish nationalist activist
- Ian Macdonald (barrister) (1939−2019), Scottish barrister
- Ian Macdonald (New South Wales politician) (born 1949), former Australian state politician
- Ian G. Macdonald (1928−2023), British mathematician
- L. Ian MacDonald (1947–2026), Canadian writer, broadcaster, and diplomat
- H. Ian Macdonald (born 1929), Canadian economist, civil servant, and President of York University, 1974−1984
- Ian MacDonald (architect) (born 1953), Canadian architect
- Ian Verner Macdonald (1925–2022), Canadian writer and diplomat
- Ian MacDonald (physician) (1873−1932), Scottish physician
- Ian MacDonald (rugby union) (born 1968), South African rugby union player
- Ian Macdonald, Canadian musician, keyboard player for the 1990s band Punchbuggy
- Ian Macdonald, character in the 1927 film Annie Laurie

Iain MacDonald or McDonald may refer to:

- Iain MacDonald (businessman), Irish entrepreneur
- Iain B. MacDonald, British television director
- Iain Fraoch MacDonald (died 1368), founder of Clan MacDonald of Glencoe
- Iain Sprangach MacDonald (died 1340), founder of Clan MacDonald of Ardnamurchan
- Iain McDonald (born 1952), Scottish football winger with Rangers and Dundee United
- Iain MacDonald, Scottish bagpiper, one of the MacDonald Brothers
