= David Wakefield =

David Wakefield may refer to:

- David Wakefield (cricketer) (born 1994), American cricketer
- David Wakefield (rugby league) (1936–2022), English rugby league player
- Dave Wakefield (born 1965), English footballer
