= James Grieve =

James Grieve may refer to:

- James Grieve (apple), an old variety of apple
- James Grieve (Scottish translator) (died 1773), Scottish translator, writer and physician
- James Grieve (Australian translator) (born 1934), Australian translator of French literature
- James Grieve (director)
- James Grieve (footballer), English football forward active in the 1930s
- James Grieve (archaeologist) Scottish archaeologist and antiquarian
- James Grieve (Liberal politician) (1810–1891), Scottish Liberal politician
- James Michael Trevlyn Grieve (1932–1995), Scottish journalist and political activist
- James Nicol Grieve (1855–1918), farmer and political figure in Ontario, Canada

== See also ==
- Grieve (surname)
