= Andrew Welch =

Andrew Welch may refer to:

- Andrew Welch (theatre producer) (born 1949), British theatre producer
- Andrew Welch (politician) (born 1972), American politician in the Georgia House of Representatives

== See also ==
- Andrew Welsh (disambiguation)
