= Kilty =

Kilty is a surname. Notable people with the surname include:

- Augustus Kilty (1807–1879), United States Navy officer who served during the Civil War
- Dovilė Kilty (née Dzindzaletaitė; born 1993), Lithuanian track and field athlete
- Jerome Kilty (born 1922), American actor and playwright
- Mark Kilty (born 1981), former English professional football defender who played 23 league games
- Richard Kilty (born 1989), British sprinter
- William Kilty (1757–1821), United States federal judge

== See also ==
- USS Kilty, a Wickes-class destroyer in the United States Navy
- Willie Cameron (1883–1958), Scottish football player and manager known by the nickname 'Kilty'
