= New Jersey ShoreCats =

- League: USBL
- Founded: 1998
- Dissolved: 2000
- History: New Jersey ShoreCats (1998–2000)
- Arena: Asbury Park Convention Hall
- Location: Asbury Park, New Jersey
- Team colors: teal, yellow, white
- Ownership: New Jersey Hoop Group
- Website: shorecats.com (archived on December 12, 1998)

The New Jersey ShoreCats were a professional basketball team in the United States Basketball League (USBL) from 1998 to 2000. The team was based in Asbury Park, New Jersey and played home games at Asbury Park Convention Hall.

The ShoreCats were owned by a group called New Jersey Hoop Group which was composed of three investors; George Michals, Tony Caruso and Jim Jennings. Jennings also served as team president in 1998. Rick Barry was hired as the Shorecats head coach before the 1998 season. Dwight D. Wilbur served as Barry's assistant coach. New Jersey's first pick in the 1998 USBL draft was Elijah Allen from Farleigh Dickenson University. By May 31, 1998 the team was averaging a paid attendance of 1,900 per game and had $500,000 in corporate sponsorships according to team president and part-owner Jim Jennings. Yinka Dare, the 7'1" center who previously played for the NBA New Jersey Nets, played for the ShoreCats in 1998 and averaged 14.2 points, 9.9 rebounds and 3.6 blocks per game. He was released by the team in June 1998 due to "personal matters" according to New Jersey coach Rick Barry. By the end of the season, the ShoreCats were averaging more than 2,000 attendees per game — a USBL best. Greg Grant was hired as head coach for the 2000 season. He replaced Rick Barry who served as the team's head coach for two seasons (1998–99). Grant suspended New Jersey's assistant coach Marshall Grier on May 8, 2000. Grant later resigned due to disagreements with Grier, who was given the interim head coaching reigns.

== All-time roster ==
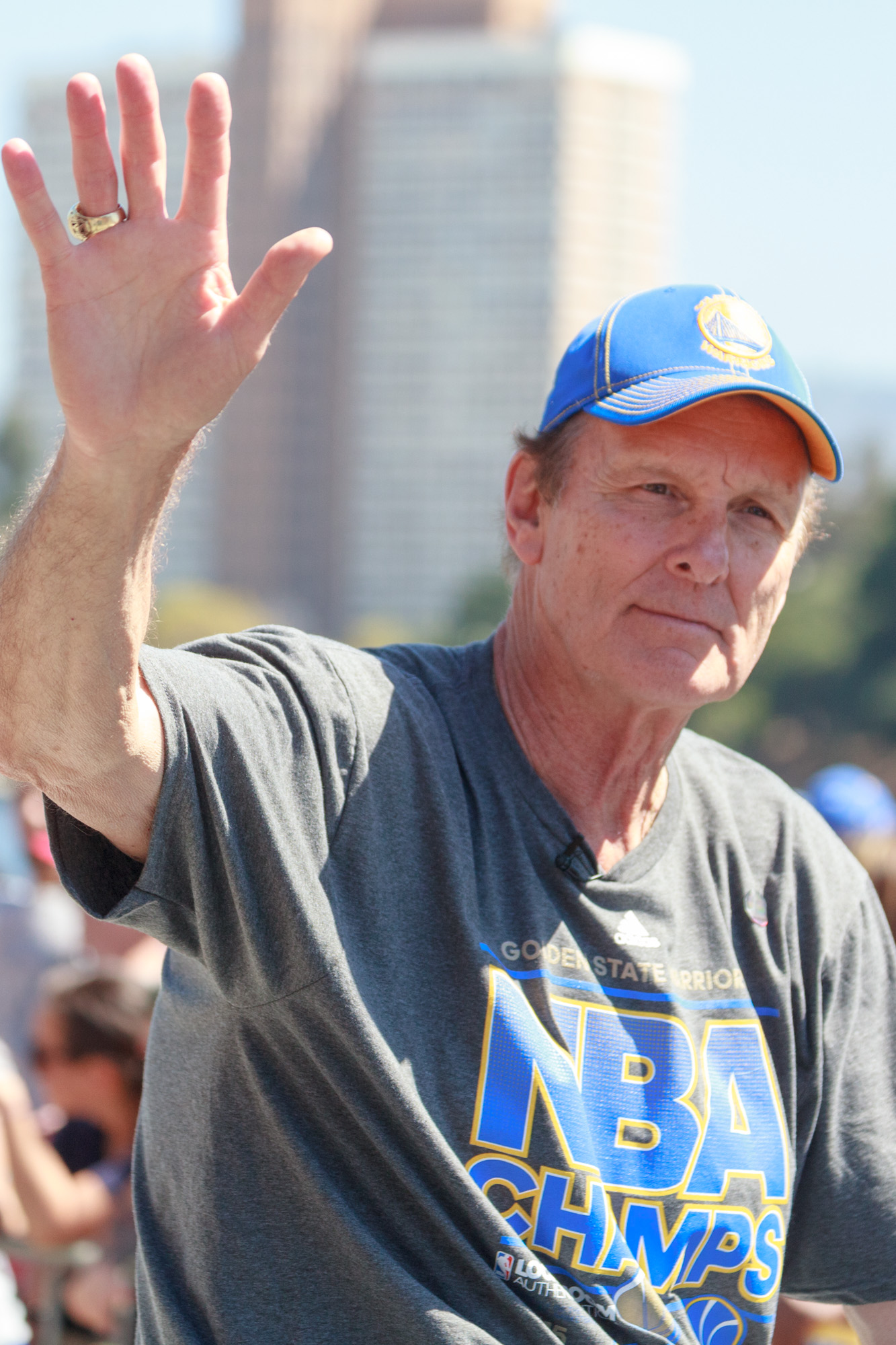
Rick Barry was the ShoreCats head coach for two seasons (1998–99).

- Elijah Allen
- Tunji Awojobi
- Mark Blount
- Ira Bowman
- Yinka Dare
- A. J. English
- Darrin Hancock
- Joe Scott
- Freddy Herzog
- Matt Garrison
- Kwan Johnson
- Jabaar Jones
- John Kimbrell
- Tony Madison
- Marshall Grier
- Jason Murdock
- Rocky Walls
- Speedy Williams

== Season-by-season records ==
Year	W	L	Win %	Head coach
1998	14	12	.538	Rick Barry
1999	19	9	.679	Rick Barry
2000	19	11	..633	Greg Grant; Marshall Grier (interim)

== See also ==
- New Jersey Gems
- New Jersey Jammers
- New Jersey Meteors
