= Andrew Welsh =

Andrew or Andy Welsh may refer to:

- Andy Welsh (footballer, born 1917) (1917–1990), English footballer
- Andrew Welsh (politician) (1944–2021), Scottish politician
- Andy Welsh (footballer, born 1962), English footballer for Blackpool and Bury, see List of Bury F.C. players (1–24 appearances)
- Andrew Welsh (footballer) (born 1983), Australian rules footballer
- Andy Welsh (born 1983), English footballer

== See also ==
- Andrew Welch (disambiguation)
