= Robert Goddard (disambiguation) =

Robert H. Goddard (1882–1945) was an American scientist and pioneer of modern rocketry.

Robert Goddard may also refer to:

- Robert Goddard (novelist) (born 1954), British novelist
- Robert Goddard (footballer) (1898–1968), English footballer
- Robert Hale Ives Goddard (1837–1916), American businessman and politician from Rhode Island
- Robert Hale Ives Goddard III (1941-2025), American anthropologist and linguist
- Sir Robert Victor Goddard (1897–1987), British Royal Air Force officer
- Robert Goddard, witness in a trial after the Boston Massacre (1770)
