= Jim Scarborough =

English footballer (1931–2019)

Personal information
- Full name: James Albert Scarborough
- Date of birth: 10 June 1931
- Place of birth: Nottingham, England
- Date of death: 6 November 2019 (aged 88)
- Place of death: Billingham, England
- Position: Centre forward

Senior career*
Years	Team	Apps	(Gls)
–1951	West Bromwich Albion	0	(0)
1951–1954	Darlington	49	(15)
1954–1955	Cheltenham Town		
1955	North Shields		
1955–195?	Horden Colliery Welfare		
1957–19??	Scarborough		
- * Club domestic league appearances and goals

James Albert Scarborough (10 June 1931 – 6 November 2019) was an English professional footballer who played in the Football League as a centre forward for Darlington in the 1950s. He was on the books of West Bromwich Albion as an amateur, without playing for their first team, and played non-league football for clubs including Cheltenham Town, North Shields, Horden Colliery Welfare and Scarborough.

== Life and career ==
Scarborough was born in 1931 in Nottingham. He was on the books of West Bromwich Albion as an amateur when he was posted to Catterick Camp, in the North Riding of Yorkshire, to do his National Service with the 17th/21st Lancers. He served on the physical training staff, and played for his regimental football team alongside future Scotland international Ronnie Simpson.

He joined Third Division North club Darlington in September 1951, and made his debut on 10 November in a 2–1 win at home to Wrexham, in which he scored the opening goal after eight minutes with a "smart header" from Ronnie Steel's cross. He added eight more goals from his 15 further appearances that season, and played in six matches at the start of the next. but for the next six months Harry Clarke or Johnny Dowson were preferred at centre forward. Scarborough returned to the side in March 1953, scored, and kept his place to the end of the season, which he finished with four goals from 20 appearances. In 1953–54, he scored twice from 14 matches, and at the end of that season, he was transfer listed at a fee of £1000.

Ahead of the 1954–55 season, Scarborough was one of a particularly large number of new signings made by Southern League club Cheltenham Town. After a few matches, he returned home, stating that the accommodation provided was unsatisfactory. The club suspended him for breach of contract, and his appeal to the Football Association failed. Despite their belief that they would be top of the league rather than second had Scarborough stayed, Cheltenham were prepared to let him leave. The fee was too steep for some North-Eastern League clubs, but North Shields were able to negotiate a reduction, and signed Scarborough in February 1955. Described as "well built and nearly six feet tall", his "bustle and punch" was thought well suited to a team noted for "good approach play". He did not re-sign for the next season, was released in October, and moved on to Horden Colliery Welfare, who had not been willing to meet his asking price six months earlier. He joined Scarborough of the Midland League in 1957, was their top scorer in the 1957–58 season with 19 goals, and remained with the club until at least 1959.

Scarborough was married to Kathlyn, whom he met in Darlington when she was working in an auction house opposite the football club's Feethams ground. He died in Billingham in 2019 at the age of 88.

== Sources ==
- Tweddle, Frank (2000). The Definitive Darlington F.C. Nottingham: SoccerData. ISBN 978-1-899468-15-7.
