= James Crumley (footballer) =

Scottish footballer

Personal information
- Full name: James Brymer Crumley
- Birth name: James Crumley Brymer
- Date of birth: 17 July 1890
- Place of birth: Lochee, Scotland
- Date of death: 1981 (aged 90)
- Place of death: Merton, London, England
- Height: 5 ft 11 in (1.80 m)
- Position: Goalkeeper

Senior career*
Years	Team	Apps	(Gls)
–	Harp		
1911–1912	Dundee Hibernian	19	(0)
1912	Vale of Atholl	0	(0)
–	Paterson Rangers		
191?–1913	IRT Strollers		
1913–1914	New York Celtic		
1914–1915	Arbroath		
1919	Dundee Hibernian		
1919–1923	Swansea Town (Note: Figures omit appearances in the 1919–20 Southern League season.)	28	(0)
1923–1924	Bristol City	2	(0)
1924–1926	Darlington	66	(0)
1926–1929	Bournemouth & Boscombe Athletic	51	(0)
- * Club domestic league appearances and goals

James Brymer Crumley (17 July 1890 – 1981), also known as Jamie, Jim or Jimmy Crumley, was a Scottish footballer who played as a goalkeeper.

A native of Dundee, Crumley began his football career with Junior club Harp, from where he moved into the senior ranks, spending the 1911–12 Scottish League season with Dundee Hibernian. He played in America for two seasons, then returned to Scotland where he kept goal for Central League team Arbroath before serving with the Royal Engineers during the First World War. He resumed his football career with a brief return to Dundee Hibs, then moved south of the border to play for Swansea Town, initially in the Southern League and then for three seasons in the English Football League. This was followed by a year with Bristol City, two seasons with Darlington, whom he helped gain promotion to the Second Division, and three years with Bournemouth & Boscombe Athletic where he finished his career.

== Personal life ==
Crumley was born in Dundee in 1890, the son of William Ferguson Crumley, a tinsmith. His older brother, Bob Crumley, also played professionally as a goalkeeper, and was in the Dundee team that won the 1910 Scottish Cup Final, defeating Clyde after two replays. The passenger list when he sailed for America in 1912 listed his occupation as that of blacksmith. During the First World War, Crumley joined the Royal Engineers. By mid-1915, he was a section corporal stationed near Dundee, and he went to reach the rank of sergeant and served in France. He was twice mentioned in despatches, and was wounded and affected by shell shock.

He married Eva Caroline Camamile at All Saints' Church, Winthorpe, Nottinghamshire, in 1921. In 1932, while working as traffic manager for a lorry firm, Crumley suffered head injuries when the lorry he was travelling in struck a stationary vehicle; his two colleagues were killed. At the time, he was living in the Kensington district of London. His death at the age of 90 was registered in the second quarter of 1981 in the Merton registration district, which covers the London Borough of Merton.

== Football career ==
=== Early career ===
Crumley joined Dundee Hibernian from Junior club Harp in September 1911. The Courier thought the club had "done a good stroke of business" in recruiting "without doubt one of the finest goalkeepers in the district". He went straight into the team for the Second Division visit to Albion Rovers on 16 September, and missed only one match between then and the end of the season. He did not re-sign for the new season, because he intended to go to America to play football, but before he left in October, he appeared for Vale of Atholl in the Qualifying Cup.

While in America he was reported to have played for a variety of clubs, including Paterson Rangers, IRT Strollers, for whom he appeared on the losing side in the (New York) Metropolitan League Cup, and New York Celtic. He was selected in goal for the New York State Amateur League representative eleven to face the National Association Football League on New Year's Day 1914; his team lost 3–1. In June of that year, he returned to Scotland on the SS California. The liner ran aground off the coast of Ireland with more than a thousand passengers aboard, all of whom had to be transferred to other vessels to complete their crossing.

Bob Crumley had captained Central League club Arbroath in the 1913–14 season, but when his work restricted his availability, he recommended the club try his brother instead. Crumley "worthily upheld his reputation", appearing in 31 of the 32 matches played in all competitions. During the First World War, Crumley played for his regimental team, and for English clubs Nottingham Forest and Swindon Town, when his military duties allowed.

=== Post-war career ===
Dundee Hibs had retained his registration ever since he left the club in 1912, and he resumed playing for them in March 1919. He signed on again for the 1919–20 Eastern League season, and his performances attracted attention from clubs outside Scotland. On 20 December 1919, he signed for Swansea Town, then a Southern League club, for a fee reported to be over £200. Crumley himself received a share of the fee as well as wages of £6 a week, and the Dundee People's Journal wished him well: "A cheery personality in the pavilion and out of it, James Crumley deserves the best, for he's a tip-top player, and a 'sport' in victory and defeat alike."

He went straight into the first team for the Christmas fixtures against Bristol Rovers; although Swansea conceded three goals in the away match, the Cambrian Daily Leader stated that "one could not improve on Crumley as a goalie." The following March, he was selected to keep goal for a Southern League Welsh XI against their English counterparts. Swansea were elected to the Football League in 1920, when a new Third Division was formed from the majority of the previous season's Southern League First Division clubs. Crumley played early in the season, but did not keep his place. A year later, the Sunday Post suggested he had "improved wonderfully since the opening of last season", but although he remained with Swansea until 1923, he played mainly for the reserve team.

Crumley joined Bristol City, newly promoted to the Second Division for 1923–24, as a backup to Frank Vallis. By 13 October, with Bristol City already bottom of the table and both Vallis and Robert Goddard already tried in goal, Crumley made his debut in a 1–1 draw with Southampton. According to the Western Daily Press, he had nothing to do, so "we [had] yet to learn ... how good he is when asked to meet League requirements". He kept his place for the next match, a 1–0 defeat to Fulham, in which he exhibited a tendency to rush off his line when he should not, but that was his last appearance in the League side.

=== Later career ===
When Andy Greig was released by Third Division North club Darlington in June 1924 for financial reasons, Crumley signed as his replacement; his brother had kept goal for the club when they played in the North-Eastern League before the war. Crumley was ever-present as Darlington won the division and consequent promotion to the Second Division. Although the record-breaking goalscoring of Davie Brown attracted most attention, Crumley's contribution to his club's success was generally appreciated. A profile in the Derby Daily Telegraph at the start of the new season described him as "not as tall as some goalkeepers, but his sense of anticipation is highly developed, while his judgment is good, hands safe, and his clearances pronounced." Performances such as that in a draw with Chelsea in October 1925, when "practically every report of the match, in which two goals were divided, declared Crumley as one of the best on the field", led to speculation about his possible selection for the Scotland national team, yet two weeks after the Chelsea match, after 55 consecutive first-team appearances, he was dropped to the reserves in favour of John Maughan. The two shared goalkeeping duties for the remainder of the season, Crumley making 24 league appearances. He was not included on Darlington's retained list, and signed for Third Division South club Bournemouth & Boscombe Athletic.

Crumley began his Bournemouth career as reserve, but was in the first team by mid-September. According to the Daily Express, it was due to Crumley's "heroic efforts" that Coventry City's score was restricted to six, but in October, he scored an own goal in a draw with Merthyr Town and then fumbled a cross to gift Exeter City a goal. He and Jock Robson each made 42 appearances in league matches over their first two seasons, after which Crumley was retained for 1928–29 but used mainly as backup for Peter McSevich. Crumley retired at the end of that season, having made 147 appearances over a nine-year career in the English Football League.
