= Two Moors Festival =

The Two Moors Festival is an annual classical music festival based in Devon and Somerset, England. It covers the largest geographic area of any U.K. festival, and is based in the towns and villages of Dartmoor and Exmoor.

== History ==
The festival was started in 2001 after the UK critical outbreak of Foot-and-mouth disease closed access to large part of the English countryside. The festival was held to bring some light relief and encourage people to return to the rural areas in Devon. It has become an annual event, with a concerts being staged at venues across Dartmoor and Exmoor.

During the preparations for the 2007 festival, on 10 April 2007 a £45,000 Bösendorfer piano being delivered to the home of John and Penny Adie, the organisers of the festival, was dropped by delivery company G&R. A replacement piano was given by the makers for the following years festival.

In 2016 the festival programme included the Carducci String Quartet, Opus Anglicanum with reader Zeb Soanes, and the Gildas Quartet. The final night of the festival was planned to be held in Exeter Cathedral with a fundraising reception at the Royal Clarence Hotel. A fire at the hotel on 28 October 2016, meant that neither event could take place.

== Format ==
The concerts are held at eleven rural towns and villages across Dartmoor and Exmoor, featuring established global performers as well as young, local musicians. There is a competition in the form of the festival's Young Musician's Platform. There are workshops to give local schoolchildren the chance to learn a classical musical instrument. Many of the local schools are unable to offer such lessons, and workshops reach 700 youngsters who would otherwise miss out.

== Previous performers ==
- Dame Felicity Lott (soprano)
- Geraldine McGreevey (soprano)
- Sarah Connolly (mezzo-soprano)
- Mark Padmore (tenor)
- Sir Thomas Allen (baritone)
- Wolfgang Holzmair (baritone)
- Tamsin Waley-Cohen (violin)
- Julian Lloyd Webber (cello)
- Sarah Williamson (clarinet)
- New London Chamber Ensemble (wind quintet)
- Andreas Haefliger (pianist)
- Julian Perkins (harpsichord and clavichord)

== Organisation ==
- Royal Patron: Sophie, Duchess of Edinburgh
- Honorary Patron: Penny Adie
- Artistic Director: Tamsin Waley-Cohen
- Chairman: Andrew Welch

General Manager: Nicola Semple

The Two Moors Festival is controlled by Two Moors Festival Limited which has charitable status.
