= Ken Ellis =

Ken Ellis may refer to:

- Ken Ellis (American football) (born 1947), American football player
- Ken Ellis (footballer, born 1928) (1928–2003), English football winger with Chester and Wrexham
- Ken Ellis (footballer, born 1948) (1948–1992), English football defender or forward with Hartlepool, Darlington and in Belgium
