= Joseph Scott =

Joseph or Joe Scott may refer to:

== Entertainment ==
- Joe Scott (musician) (1924–1979), American R&B songwriter, musician and arranger
- Josey Scott (born 1971), American musician, lead vocalist of the band Saliva
- Joseph "Lucky" Scott (died 1996), American bassist

== Military ==
- Joseph Warren Scott (1778–1871), colonel in U.S. Army
- Joseph Francis Scott (1864–1941), American Medal of Honor recipient

== Sports ==
=== Association football (soccer) ===
- Joe Scott (footballer, born 1900) (1900–1962), English footballer with Rotherham County, Barnsley and Tottenham Hotspur
- Joe Scott (footballer, born 1901) (1901–1972), English footballer with Sunderland, Darlington and South Shields
- Joe Scott (footballer, born 1930) (1930–2018), English footballer with Luton Town, Middlesbrough, Hartlepools United and York City
- Joey Scott (footballer) (Born 1953), English footballer see List of AFC Bournemouth players (1–24 appearances)

=== Baseball ===
- Joe Scott (1930s first baseman) (1906–1947), American baseball player
- Joe Scott (1940s first baseman) (1918–1997), American baseball player
- Joe Burt Scott (1920–2013), American baseball player

=== Other sports ===
- Joe Scott (walker) (1860–1908), New Zealand world champion walker
- Joseph Scott (bobsleigh) (1922–2000), American bobsledder of the 1950s
- Joe Scott (American football) (1926–2016), American football player
- Joe Scott (basketball player) (1916–1971), American basketball player and decathlete
- Joe Scott (basketball coach) (born 1965), American basketball coach

== Other ==
- Joseph Nicol Scott (1703–1769), English physician, dissenting minister and writer
- Joseph Scott (merchant) (died 1800), merchant and politician in Nova Scotia
- Sir Joseph Scott, 1st Baronet (1752–1828), English landowner and politician
- Joseph F. Scott (New York official) (1860–1918), New York Superintendent of State Prisons
- Joseph Scott (attorney) (1867–1958), attorney and community leader in Los Angeles, California
- Joseph Scott (police officer) (1901–1962), Garda Síochána and recipient of the Scott Medal
- Joe Scott (businessman) (1908–2002), American businessman, founding partner of the Philadelphia Flyers
