= Joseph Turner =

Joseph Turner may refer to:

- J. M. W. Turner (1775–1851), British landscape painter
- Joseph Turner (loyalist) (1701–1783), prominent figure in colonial and revolutionary Pennsylvania
- Joseph Turner (priest) (1746–1828), Dean of Norwich, 1790–1828
- Joseph Turner (architect) (died 1807), flourished in Cheshire in the late 18th century
- Joseph Turner (Wisconsin politician) (died 1874), assemblyman from Wisconsin
- Joseph Hudson Turner (1872–1937), Wrexham A.F.C. and Wales international footballer
- Lt. Joseph Turner a character from Call of Duty: WWII

== See also ==
- Joe Turner (disambiguation)
