= Michael Boyle =

Michael or Mike Boyle may refer to:

- Michael Boyle (bishop of Waterford and Lismore) (c.1580–1635), Church of Ireland bishop
- Michael Boyle (archbishop of Armagh) (c.1609–1702), Church of Ireland primate; nephew of the above
- Michael Boyle (footballer) (born 1986/1987), Irish Gaelic goalkeeper
- Michael E. Boyle (born 1965), United States Navy admiral
- Mike Boyle (1944–2021), mayor of Omaha, Nebraska and member of the Douglas County Board of Commissioners
- Mike Boyle (footballer) (1908–?), English football full back active in the 1930s
- Mikey Boyle, Irish hurler
