= Joe Turner =

Joe Turner is the name of:

- Big Joe Turner (1911–1985), blues singer
- Joe Turner (jazz pianist) (1907–1990), jazz/stride pianist
- Joe Lynn Turner (born 1951), rock musician
- Joe Turner (footballer, born 1872) (1872–1950), English football winger for Southampton, Stoke and Everton
- Joe Turner (footballer, born 1931) (1931–2008), English football goalkeeper for Stockport, Darlington, Scunthorpe and Barnsley
- Joe Turner (ice hockey) (1919–1944 or 1945), Canadian hockey player
- Joe Turner (writer), British writer
- Joe M. Turner (born 1969), American magician and speaker

== Fictional characters ==
- a character in the play Joe Turner's Come and Gone
- a fictional CIA analyst

== See also ==
- Joseph Turner (disambiguation)
