= Frank Gower =

English footballer (c.1915–c.1938)

Personal information
- Full name: Frank Gower
- Date of birth: c. 1915
- Place of birth: Tunbridge Wells, Kent, England
- Height: 6 ft 0 in (1.83 m)
- Position: Goalkeeper

Senior career*
Years	Team	Apps	(Gls)
1934–1938	Tunbridge Wells Rangers		
1938–1939	Darlington	7	(0)
- * Club domestic league appearances and goals

Frank Gower (c. 1915 – after 1938) was an English footballer who played as a goalkeeper in the Football League for Darlington and in the Southern League for Tunbridge Wells Rangers.

== Football career ==
Gower was born in Tunbridge Wells, Kent, and played local football in the area before coming to the attention of Southern League club Tunbridge Wells Rangers when he faced them as goalkeeper for a team representing the town's Unemployed Centre. He made a "very creditable" debut for their Kent League side in October 1934, performing "like a seasoned player, positioning himself well and dealing with several shots in a manner which would have done credit to a more experienced goalkeeper." He continued as a regular selection in the Kent League team, apart from a spell around Christmas after he injured a wrist in a friendly match in France against Racing Club de Calais, and made a few appearances in the Southern League towards the end of the season.

The club seemed likely to fold over the summer of 1935, but it did not, and Gower began the new season with the reserves, conceding 13 goals to Canterbury Waverley. The heavy defeats continued: 7–1 to Northfleet United, 8–1 to Gillingham, and the visit to Ashford was abandoned because of fog with Rangers 5–1 down. But Gower kept his place, appeared occasionally for the first team, and, after a 4–0 defeat at Folkestone, prompted the Kent & Sussex Courier's pseudonymous "Ajax" to suggest that "if he could always produce the form that he did against Folkestone, he would not be long with the Rangers ... He would have done credit to a First Division team, and that is not flying too high when judged on the remarkable exhibition that he gave." He also played in the final of the Southern League Cup, which Rangers lost to Plymouth Argyle Reserves, and by the start of the 1936–37 season, he was the recognised first choice in goal.

He missed a few weeks after dislocating a finger against Norwich City reserves at the beginning of October, but was fully fit to face Enfield in the final qualifying round of the 1936–37 FA Cup. In the first round, away to fellow Southern League club Bath City, he made none of the positional errors to which he had been prone, and "gathered the ball cleanly, showed intelligence in advancing to meet it, and was resourceful and daring in making a number of spectacular full-length dives", as his side progressed to face Football League club Accrington Stanley in the second. They lost to the only goal of the game, as Georgie Mee took advantage of Gower being "crowded out" of his attempt to catch a steeply dropping ball. He missed several weeks of the second part of the season when he needed stitches to a finger that had first been damaged some weeks previously.

Gower's improved performances – attributed by "Ajax" in no small part to the influence of new manager Jock Denoon, himself a former goalkeeper – earned him the prospect of a trial with Manchester United. The posters for the visit of Lord John Sanger's Circus to Tunbridge Wells issued a challenge to Gower to keep goal against "Jumbo the elephant goal-getter"; a leg muscle injury perhaps prevented his taking up the challenge. He was soon back in action, but after a finger injury in November stopped him keeping goal, he was selected as an outfield player, making a competent display on the wing in the next Kent League match. When he returned to goal in the Kent League team, he was off form, rumours of a trial with a Midlands club were denied, and he finally returned to first-team duty in February. At the end of the season, the club was in such financial difficulty that none of the players were retained.

Gower signed for Third Division North club Darlington in the 1938 close season. He began the season in the reserves, and eventually made his Football League debut on 24 December against Bradford City; Darlington lost 4–0. He kept his place over the Christmas and New Year matches, including the Northern Section Cup defeat to Hartlepools United, in which he was "amongst the busiest members of the Darlington side", and one of their best in a draw with 10-man Halifax Town. After a 4–0 defeat at Southport on 21 January 1939, Ken Parkinson returned to the team, and Gower made no more appearances for the first team.
