= Alf Dolphin =

English footballer

Personal information
- Full name: Alfred Dolphin
- Date of birth: 12 June 1889
- Place of birth: Redditch, England
- Date of death: 1940 (aged 50–51) (Note: Dolphin's death was registered in the second quarter of 1940 in the Bromsgrove registration district, which covered Bromsgrove, Redditch, and nearby villages.)
- Place of death: Worcestershire, England
- Height: 5 ft 7 in (1.70 m)
- Position: Outside right

Senior career*
| Years | Team | Apps | (Gls) |
| 19??–1914 | Redditch | | |
| 1914–1915 | Nuneaton Town | | |
| 1919–1920 | Oldham Athletic | 16 | (0) |
| 1920–1921 | Notts County | 24 | (3) |
| 1921–1922 | Darlington | 33 | (3) |
| 1922–1923 | Stockport County | 11 | (0) |
| 1923–1924 | Walsall | 13 | (1) |
- Weymouth
- * Club domestic league appearances and goals

Alfred Dolphin (12 June 1889 – 1940) was an English footballer who made 97 appearances in the Football League playing as an outside right for Oldham Athletic, Notts County, Darlington, Stockport County and Walsall. He also played non-league football for clubs including Redditch, Nuneaton Town and Weymouth.

== Early life and career ==
Dolphin was born in Redditch, Worcestershire, the third son of Alfred, a fishhook maker, and wife, Emily, who lived in Salters Yard in the town. By 1901, after the death of his mother, the 11-year-old Dolphin had moved in with his maternal grandparents, together with his father and five siblings, and had followed his older brothers into fishhook manufacture. He was still employed in that trade ten years later. He played football for Redditch in the Birmingham Combination, and in March 1914, he took part in a trial for the Birmingham Football Association team to face the Scottish Junior Football Association XI, but was not selected. He joined Nuneaton Town for the 1914–15 season, and was "the 'star' outside forward of the season" as his new team won the Birmingham Combination title.

== Oldham Athletic ==
When league football resumed after the First World War, Dolphin joined Oldham Athletic. He made his First Division debut on 8 September 1919 in a 3–1 defeat away to Manchester City. Later that year, he was involved in an unpleasant incident in a match at home to Burnley. He kicked the opposing left back, Cliff Jones, who retaliated, and the referee sent Jones off. Reports vary as to whether Dolphin's initial kick was accidental or not; after several minutes' delay, during which the referee was surrounded by arguing players and a few spectators had to be removed from the field, play resumed with a free kick for Burnley. In the reverse fixture a few days later, Dolphin suffered a fracture when he fell awkwardly, landing on his right shoulder, and Burnley's Tommy Boyle landed on him. Jones was suspended for two months for the incident and for refusing to leave the field; Dolphin returned to first-team duty in the 3–0 defeat at Sunderland some six weeks later, but played infrequently thereafter.

== Notts County ==
Ahead of the 1920–21 season, Dolphin signed for Notts County of the Second Division; the Nottingham Evening Post described him as possessing speed and admirable ball control. He played 24 matches, all in the league, and scored three times: a winning goal against Fulham on 2 October scored from the left wing with what "appeared to be intended for a centre, but the ball swerved into goal", the third of a 3–0 win against Stoke later in the month, and in a 2–0 win against Blackpool in December.

== Darlington ==
Dolphin's services were not retained, and he moved on to Darlington, elected to the newly formed Third Division North for the 1921–22 Football League season. He played in the club's first match in the Football League, a 2–0 defeat of Halifax Town on 27 August 1921. He set up two of Darlington's goals in a 7–0 rout of Chesterfield in September, a performance which surprised the Derbyshire Courier's correspondent, who had seen him struggle against the same opponents the season before in the Midland League with Notts County reserves. He played 33 league games, scoring three goals, and helped Darlington finish as runners-up in the division.

== Later career ==
Dolphin was one of several regular players who moved on at the end of the season. He returned to the Second Division with Stockport County, who had beaten Darlington to the Third Division North title. Although he was reportedly much missed by Darlington, despite having been "considered a crock" by his previous clubs, and still had pace and "when at his best can centre a ball with rare effect and judgment", he played only eleven league matches for Stockport and the same number for their reserves in the Cheshire County League.

His last league club was Walsall in the Third Division North. Although at the start of the 1923–24 season, he was reported fully recovered from a career-threatening knee injury and back to fine form, he made only 13 league appearances. He went on to play for Southern League club Weymouth.
