= Ken Parkinson =

English footballer (1911–1987)

Personal information
- Full name: Kenneth Parkinson
- Date of birth: 21 September 1911
- Place of birth: Neville's Cross, England
- Date of death: 1987 (aged 75)
- Place of death: Darlington, England
- Height: 5 ft 10 1/2 in (1.79 m)
- Position: Goalkeeper

Senior career*
Years	Team	Apps	(Gls)
19??–1933	Esh Winning		
1933–1935	Sheffield Wednesday	0	(0)
1935–1936	Shrewsbury Town		
1936–1939	Darlington	87	(0)
- * Club domestic league appearances and goals

Kenneth Parkinson (21 September 1911 – 1987) was an English footballer who made 87 appearances in the Football League playing as a goalkeeper for Darlington in the 1930s. He was on the books of Sheffield Wednesday, without playing for the club's first team, and also played non-league football for Esh Winning and Shrewsbury Town.

== Life and career ==
Parkinson was born in 1911 in Neville's Cross, County Durham, the son of Walter Parkinson, a cokeman, and his wife, Eliza. He played football for Esh Winning of the Northern League, and was a member of the Durham Amateur XI that faced a North-Eastern League selection in April 1933 as part of the Durham FA's jubilee celebrations.

After trials with their reserve team towards the end of the 1932–33 season, Parkinson signed professional forms with Football League First Division club Sheffield Wednesday. He played regularly in the reserves, and was retained for the 1934–35 season, but got no closer to the first team, and was listed for transfer at a fee of £100. Described as "a goalkeeper of whom much is expected", Parkinson joined Shrewsbury Town for the 1935–36 season, during which he made 40 appearances and helped them finish third in the Birmingham League.

He then signed for Football League Third Division North club Darlington, whose regular goalkeeper, Harry Walker, was recovering from a knee cartilage operation. He began the season in the first team, and kept his place even after Walker returned to fitness, but a bout of influenza at the turn of the year gave Walker his opening. After a run of five defeats that left Darlington bottom of the table, Parkinson returned, but there was little improvement, and they shared the role until the end of the season. The club's application for re-election was successful, and both goalkeepers were among just six players retained.

Parkinson began the 1937–38 season in possession, but a broken bone in his wrist let Walker back in, and his performances earned him a £1000 transfer to First Division Portsmouth. Parkinson kept goal for the last couple of months of Darlington's season, and for most of the next. He was left out in December to give Frank Gower his Football League debut, but after a 4–0 loss to Southport, Parkinson returned to the team at the end of January and remained in it. Along with most of Darlington's contracted players, he was given a free transfer at the end of the season.

The 1939 Register finds Parkinson working as an annealing furnaceman in a steel foundry and living in Darlington with his wife, Maria Annie née Vest, whom he married in 1936, and their baby son, Walter. He died in Darlington in 1987 at the age of 75.
