= Terry Poole (footballer, born 1937) =

English footballer (born 1937)

Personal information
- Full name: Terence Poole
- Date of birth: 8 December 1937 (age 88)
- Place of birth: Sheffield, England
- Position: Wing half

Youth career
- 1952–1955: Sheffield Wednesday

Senior career*
Years	Team	Apps	(Gls)
1955–1959	Sheffield Wednesday	0	(0)
1959–1961	Darlington	41	(3)
1961–1965	Skegness Town		
1965–1966	Retford Town		
1966	Alfreton Town		
1966–19??	Retford Town		
- * Club domestic league appearances and goals

Terence Poole (born 8 December 1937) is an English former footballer who made 41 appearances in the Football League playing as a wing half for Darlington. He was previously on the books of Sheffield Wednesday, but never played for them in the League.

== Life and career ==
Terence Poole was born in Sheffield, West Riding of Yorkshire, on 8 December 1937. He joined Sheffield Wednesday when he left school, and turned professional at 17. Poole played for Wednesday's "A" team in the Yorkshire League, but never broke through to the first team, and he signed for Football League Fourth Division club Darlington ahead of the 1959–60 season for what was later reported as a substantial fee.

The 22-year-old Poole made his Darlington and Football League debut on 16 September 1959, playing at left half in a 1–1 draw at home to Millwall, and he retained a place in the league side for all but the last three matches of the season, mainly at right half but also occasionally at inside forward. Following the arrival of the experienced George Mulholland in 1960 to partner Brian Henderson at full back, Ken Furphy was switched to right half and Poole lost his place. He made just four league appearances in the latter part of the 1960–61 season while Furphy recovered from a knee injury, but did play and score against an all-star eleven featuring England international Tom Finney in the March 1961 benefit match for long-serving Darlington players Ron Greener and Keith Morton.

Poole left Darlington at the end of the season for Midland League football with Skegness Town, where he spent four seasons, and two spells with Retford Town, either side of four appearances for Alfreton Town in 1966.

== Sources ==
- Tweddle, Frank (2000). The Definitive Darlington F.C. Nottingham: Soccerdata. ISBN 978-1-899468-15-7.
