= Ian MacDonald (physician) =

Scottish physician (1873–1932)

Ian Macdonald (1873 – 14 September 1932) was a Scottish physician. He was educated at the Royal High School and studied at the University of Edinburgh, where he was awarded the degrees of Master of Business and C.M. in 1894, and Doctor of Medicine in 1898. His Doctor of Medicine was entitled "Treatment of superficial burns by picric acid solution: a study in repair".

In "A Time to Keep" Halliday Sutherland, his cousin, wrote about Macdonald, including his final days in 1932. The book also described the work of the clinic.
