= Joseph Hudson Turner =

Welsh footballer

Joe Turner
Personal information
- Full name: Joseph Hudson Turner
- Date of birth: 1872
- Place of birth: Wrexham, Denbighshire
- Date of death: 8 February 1937 (aged 65)
- Place of death: Hawarden, Flintshire

Senior career*
| Years | Team | Apps | (Gls) |
- Wrexham

International career
| 1892 | Wales | 1 | (0) |
- * Club domestic league appearances and goals

Joseph Hudson Turner (1872 – 8 February 1937) was a Welsh international footballer. He was part of the Wales national football team, playing 1 match on 5 March 1892 against England. At club level. he played for Wrexham.

== See also ==
- List of Wales international footballers (alphabetical)
