= Neville Chapman =

English footballer

Personal information
- Full name: Neville Chapman
- Date of birth: 15 September 1941
- Place of birth: Cockfield, County Durham, England
- Date of death: 14 October 1993 (aged 52)
- Position: Full back

Youth career
- –: Middlesbrough

Senior career*
Years	Team	Apps	(Gls)
1961–1967	Middlesbrough	53	(0)
1967–1969	Darlington	32	(0)
- * Club domestic league appearances and goals

Neville Chapman (15 September 1941 – 14 October 1993) was an English footballer who made 85 appearances in the Football League playing as a full back for Middlesbrough and Darlington in the 1960s.

Chapman was the first Middlesbrough player to be substituted after the rule permitting in-game replacements was introduced to the Football League in 1965. He was replaced by Bryan Orritt in the match against Preston North End on 11 September 1965.
