= Colin Tinsley =

English footballer

Personal information
- Date of birth: 24 October 1935 (age 91)
- Place of birth: Redcar, England
- Position: Goalkeeper

Youth career
- –: Redcar B.C.

Senior career*
Years	Team	Apps	(Gls)
1954–1958	Grimsby Town	24	(0)
1958–1961	Darlington	79	(0)
1961–1963	Exeter City	56	(1)
1963–1968	Luton Town	55	(0)
1966–19??	Kettering Town		
- * Club domestic league appearances and goals

Colin Tinsley (born 24 October 1935) is an English former footballer who made 214 appearances in the Football League playing for Grimsby Town, Darlington, Exeter City and Luton Town in the 1950s and 1960s. A goalkeeper, he also made 70 appearances in all competitions for Southern League club Kettering Town.

Tinsley is an actively practising Christian.
