= Phil Robinson (footballer, born 1942) =

English footballer

Personal information
- Date of birth: 21 November 1942
- Place of birth: Doncaster, England
- Date of death: 1989 (aged 46–47)
- Position: Winger

Youth career
- Montrose Victoria

Senior career*
Years	Team	Apps	(Gls)
1960–1961	Huddersfield Town	0	(0)
1961–1966	Doncaster Rovers	157	(19)
1966–1969	Bradford Park Avenue	116	(8)
1969–1970	Darlington	27	(4)
1970	Boston United	?	(?)
Total		30	(31)
- * Club domestic league appearances and goals

Philip Robinson (21 November 1942 – 1989) was an English professional footballer who played as a winger. Active in the Football League between 1960 and 1970, Robinson made 300 career appearances, scoring 31 goals.

== Career ==
Born in Doncaster, Robinson began his career in non-League football with Montrose Victoria, before turning professional with Huddersfield Town in 1960. He later played for Doncaster Rovers, Bradford Park Avenue and Darlington, before returning to non-League football with Boston United in 1970.

== Later life and death ==
Robinson died in 1989.
