= Joe McAninly =

English footballer

Personal information
- Full name: Joseph McAninly
- Date of birth: 15 January 1913
- Place of birth: Tow Law, County Durham, England
- Date of death: May 1989 (aged 76)
- Height: 5 ft 8 in (1.73 m)
- Position: Inside right

Senior career*
Years	Team	Apps	(Gls)
1933–1934	Huddersfield Town	0	(0)
1934–1935	Clapton Orient	0	(0)
1934–1935	→ Ashford (loan)		
1935–1936	Eden Colliery Welfare		
1936–1937	Chesterfield	2	(0)
1937–1939	Darlington	72	(7)
- * Club domestic league appearances and goals

Joseph McAninly (15 January 1913 – 1989) was an English footballer who made 74 appearances in the Football League playing as an inside right for Chesterfield and Darlington in the late 1930s. Earlier that decade he had been on the books of Huddersfield Town and Clapton Orient without representing either club in the League. Whilst with the latter club he spent a season playing for their Kent League nursery team Ashford. Thereafter he played with the Eden Colliery Welfare club in the North Eastern League before moving to Chesterfield in 1936.
