= Mick Wright (footballer, born 1950) =

English footballer (born 1950)

Personal information
- Full name: Michael Wright
- Date of birth: 17 February 1950 (age 76)
- Place of birth: Darlington, England
- Position: Defender

Youth career
- –: Darlington

Senior career*
Years	Team	Apps	(Gls)
1968–1973	Darlington	89	(0)
–	Crook Town		
- * Club domestic league appearances and goals

Michael Wright (born 17 February 1950) is an English former footballer who made 89 appearances in the Football League for Darlington in the 1960s and 1970s. A defender, he went on to play non-league football for Crook Town.
