= Joe Scott (walker) =

New Zealand athlete (1860–1908)

Joseph Scott (3 June 1860 – 9 February 1908) was a New Zealand race walker from Dunedin. He became New Zealand's first world champion athlete and world record holder in 1888.
