= Ron Ward (footballer) =

English footballer (1932–2024)

Personal information
- Full name: Henry Ronald Ward
- Date of birth: 29 March 1932
- Place of birth: Walthamstow, England
- Date of death: 5 May 2024 (aged 92)
- Height: County Durham, England
- Position: Goalkeeper

Senior career*
Years	Team	Apps	(Gls)
	Tottenham Hotspur	0	(0)
1955–1956	Headington United	14	(0)
1956–1957	Darlington	26	(0)
- * Club domestic league appearances and goals

Henry Ronald Ward (29 March 1932 – 5 May 2024) was an English footballer who made 26 appearances in the Football League playing as a goalkeeper for Darlington in the 1950s. He was on the books of Tottenham Hotspur, without representing them in the League, and also played in the Southern League for Headington United. Ward died in County Durham on 5 May 2024, aged 92.
