= Gary Hyde (footballer) =

English footballer

Personal information
- Full name: Gary Stuart Hyde
- Date of birth: 28 December 1969 (age 56)
- Place of birth: Wolverhampton, England
- Height: 6 ft 0 in (1.83 m)
- Position: Winger

Youth career
- –: Darlington

Senior career*
Years	Team	Apps	(Gls)
1987–1990	Darlington	46	(3)
1990–1991	Leicester City	0	(0)
1991–1992	Scunthorpe United	8	(0)
1992–????	Whitby Town		
- * Club domestic league appearances and goals

Gary Stuart Hyde (born 28 December 1969) is an English former footballer who made 47 appearances in the Football League playing as a winger for Darlington and Scunthorpe United. He was on the books of Leicester City, without playing for them in the League, and went on to play non-league football for Whitby Town. He was a member of the Darlington team that won the 1989–90 Football Conference title.
