= Billy Yeats =

English footballer

Personal information
- Full name: William Yeats
- Date of birth: 4 February 1951
- Place of birth: Hebburn, England
- Date of death: December 2013 (aged 62)
- Place of death: South Tyneside, England
- Position: Forward

Senior career*
Years	Team	Apps	(Gls)
1971–1972	Newcastle United	0	(0)
1972–1973	York City	9	(0)
1973–1975	Darlington	25	(7)
–	North Shields		
- * Club domestic league appearances and goals

William Yeats (4 February 1951 – December 2013) was an English footballer who made 34 appearances in the Football League playing as a forward for York City and Darlington. He was on the books of Newcastle United without representing them in the league, and went on to play non-league football for North Shields.
