= Ron Forster =

English footballer (1935–2002)

Personal information
- Full name: Ronald Forster
- Date of birth: August 19, 1935
- Place of birth: Stockton-on-Tees, England
- Date of death: January 2002 (aged 66)
- Place of death: Stockton-on-Tees, England
- Position: Winger

Senior career*
Years	Team	Apps	(Gls)
–	Shotton Colliery Welfare		
1956–1960	Darlington	57	(4)
- * Club domestic league appearances and goals

Ronald Forster (19 August 1935 – January 2002) was an English footballer who made 57 appearances in the Football League playing as a winger for Darlington between 1956 and 1960. He also played non-league football for clubs including Shotton Colliery Welfare.
