= Mark Outterside =

English footballer

Personal information
- Full name: Mark Jeremy Outterside
- Date of birth: 13 January 1967 (age 59)
- Place of birth: Hexham, England
- Height: 5 ft 11 in (1.80 m)
- Position: Right back

Youth career
- 1981–1985: Sunderland

Senior career*
| Years | Team | Apps | (Gls) |
| 1985–1987 | Sunderland | 1 | (0) |
| 1987–1988 | Darlington | 38 | (0) |
- Blyth Spartans
- Newcastle Blue Star
- Whitley Bay
- Hebburn
- Consett
- * Club domestic league appearances and goals

Mark Jeremy Outterside (born 13 January 1967) is a former footballer who made 39 appearances in the Football League playing as a right back for Sunderland and Darlington. He went on to play non-league football for clubs including Blyth Spartans, Newcastle Blue Star, Whitley Bay, Hebburn and Consett.

Outterside became a teacher, and as of 2011 was head of a primary school in Newcastle.
