= Tommy Reynolds (footballer) =

English footballer

Personal information
- Full name: Thomas Reynolds
- Date of birth: 2 October 1922
- Place of birth: Felling, England
- Date of death: March 1998 (aged 75)
- Place of death: Gateshead, England
- Position: Left wing

Youth career
- Felling Juniors

Senior career*
Years	Team	Apps	(Gls)
1946–1953	Sunderland	167	(18)
1953–1954	King's Lynn		
1954–1956	Darlington	43	(6)
- * Club domestic league appearances and goals

Thomas Reynolds (2 October 1922 – March 1998) was an English footballer who played for Sunderland and Darlington in the Football League as a winger.

== Club career ==
He joined Sunderland from youth club Felling Juniors, and made his debut against Charlton Athletic on 11 September 1946 in a 5–0 defeat at The Valley. Raised in the North East, he raced his own greyhounds at the local dog track. He left Sunderland for King's Lynn, after spending from 1946 until 1953 at the club, scoring 18 goals with 167 league appearances.

He then made 43 league appearances for Darlington.

He also managed a number of pubs, notably the North Moor in Sunderland, now demolished, and The Bush in the Hendon area of the town.
