= Tony McFadden =

English footballer

Personal information
- Full name: Anthony McFadden
- Date of birth: 18 May 1957 (age 69)
- Place of birth: Hexham, England
- Position: Forward

Senior career*
Years	Team	Apps	(Gls)
- Reyrolles
1981–1983	Darlington	47	(10)
- Blyth Spartans
- * Club domestic league appearances and goals

Anthony McFadden (born 18 May 1957) is an English former footballer who scored 10 goals from 47 appearances in the Football League playing as a forward for Darlington in the early 1980s. He also played non-league football for clubs including Reyrolles and Blyth Spartans, for whom he scored 123 goals.
