= Francis Wallace =

Scottish footballer (1909–1994)

Personal information
- Full name: Francis Jardine Wallace
- Date of birth: 10 May 1909
- Place of birth: Dumfries, Scotland
- Date of death: January 1994 (aged 84)
- Place of death: Bromley, England
- Height: 5 ft 9 in (1.75 m)
- Position: Inside left

Senior career*
Years	Team	Apps	(Gls)
1927–1931	Darlington	43	(7)
1931–1933	Tunbridge Wells Rangers		
1933–1934	Folkestone		
1934–193?	Ramsgate		
- * Club domestic league appearances and goals

Francis Jardine Wallace (10 May 1909 – 1994) was a Scottish professional footballer who made 43 appearances in the English Football League playing as an inside left for Darlington. He also played non-league football for clubs including Tunbridge Wells Rangers, Folkestone and Ramsgate. (Note: Some older sources, e.g. Michael Joyce's Football League Players' Records, list Wallace as joining Queens Park Rangers in 1931, but this would appear to stem from confusion with the name of the club he actually joined, Tunbridge Wells Rangers.)

== Life and career ==
Francis Jardine Wallace was born on 10 May 1909 in Dumfries, Scotland.

Wallace signed amateur forms with Football League Third Division North club Darlington in August 1927. He initially played for Darlington's reserve team in the North-Eastern League, and was selected for the Durham County Football Association's Amateur XI to face their Northumberland counterparts in January 1928. Wallace made his Football League debut on 16 April 1928, replacing Harry Lees at inside left for a 4–1 win at home to Nelson; he was reported to "[have given] a good display", and kept his place for the next match, after which Lees returned to the side.

He was caught up in the 1928 illegal payments crisis, in which several hundred players registered as amateurs to clubs under the auspices of the Durham Association, 24 of whom were on Darlington's books, were suspended and deemed professional for receiving "tea money" – payments, often very small, over and above reimbursement of the minimal legitimate expenses allowed. He returned to the team in late December 1928, scored against South Shields, and finished the season with two goals from 11 matches. The arrival of Fred Laycock meant Wallace played little the following season, but Laycock moved on, and Wallace began the 1930–31 campaign in the league team. After the team started badly – the Sunday Sun commented on how their third successive home defeat "once more served to demonstrate the unfortunate weakness of the home forward line, for on repeated occasions they blundered and spoiled glorious opportunities" – he lost his place to Reg Siddle, but regained it in December and played out the rest of the season for 26 appearances and five goals. He was reported to be of interest to First Division clubs at a fee of £2,000, and took the eye of the Northern Daily Mail's reporter T.F., who described him as "a great provider. A tap here, a gentle push there, a wide sweeping cross-field pass making for rapid progress, and plenty of bustle to help him along." Wallace was placed on Darlington's retained list, but he refused the terms offered for a further season, and eventually the League agreed to his being made open to transfer.

In July 1931, Wallace signed for Tunbridge Wells Rangers, newly admitted to the Southern League Eastern Division as Kent League champions, for a fee of £1,500. He played regularly for the next two seasons – taking time out in May 1932 to marry Netta Alice Beale at St Barnabas Church, Tunbridge Wells – but then became one of numerous players to leave the club because it could not afford to pay summer wages. Rumours linked him with Wigan Athletic, but instead he joined another Kent-based Southern League club, Folkestone. At the end of the 1933–34 season, there was interest from Football League Second Division club Barnsley and, more locally, Gillingham of the Third Division South, in a player described in the Folkestone Herald as "undoubtedly one of the cleverest footballers Folkestone has ever had", but nothing came of it, and he joined Ramsgate of the Kent League. In his first season, he scored eight goals and was named as one of the two most consistent players in the team, and he signed on for a second.

Wallace died in January 1994 at the age of 84; his death was registered in the Bromley district.

== Career statistics ==
Appearances and goals by club, season and competition
Club	Season	League			FA Cup		Total	
Club	Season	Division	Apps	Goals	Apps	Goals	Apps	Goals
Darlington	1927–28	Third Division North	2	0	0	0	2	0
Darlington	1928–29	Third Division North	14	2	1	0	15	2
Darlington	1929–30	Third Division North	5	0	0	0	5	0
Darlington	1930–31	Third Division North	26	5	0	0	26	5
Career total			43	7	1	0	44	7

== Sources ==
- Joyce, Michael (2004). Football League Players' Records 1888 to 1939. Nottingham: Soccerdata. ISBN 978-1-899468-67-6.
- Taylor, Matthew (2013). The Association Game: A History of British Football. Abingdon: Routledge. ISBN 978-0-582-50596-4.
- Tweddle, Frank (2000). The Definitive Darlington F.C. Nottingham: Soccerdata. ISBN 978-1-899468-15-7.
