= Ian Verner Macdonald =

Canadian diplomat and entrepreneur (1925–2022)

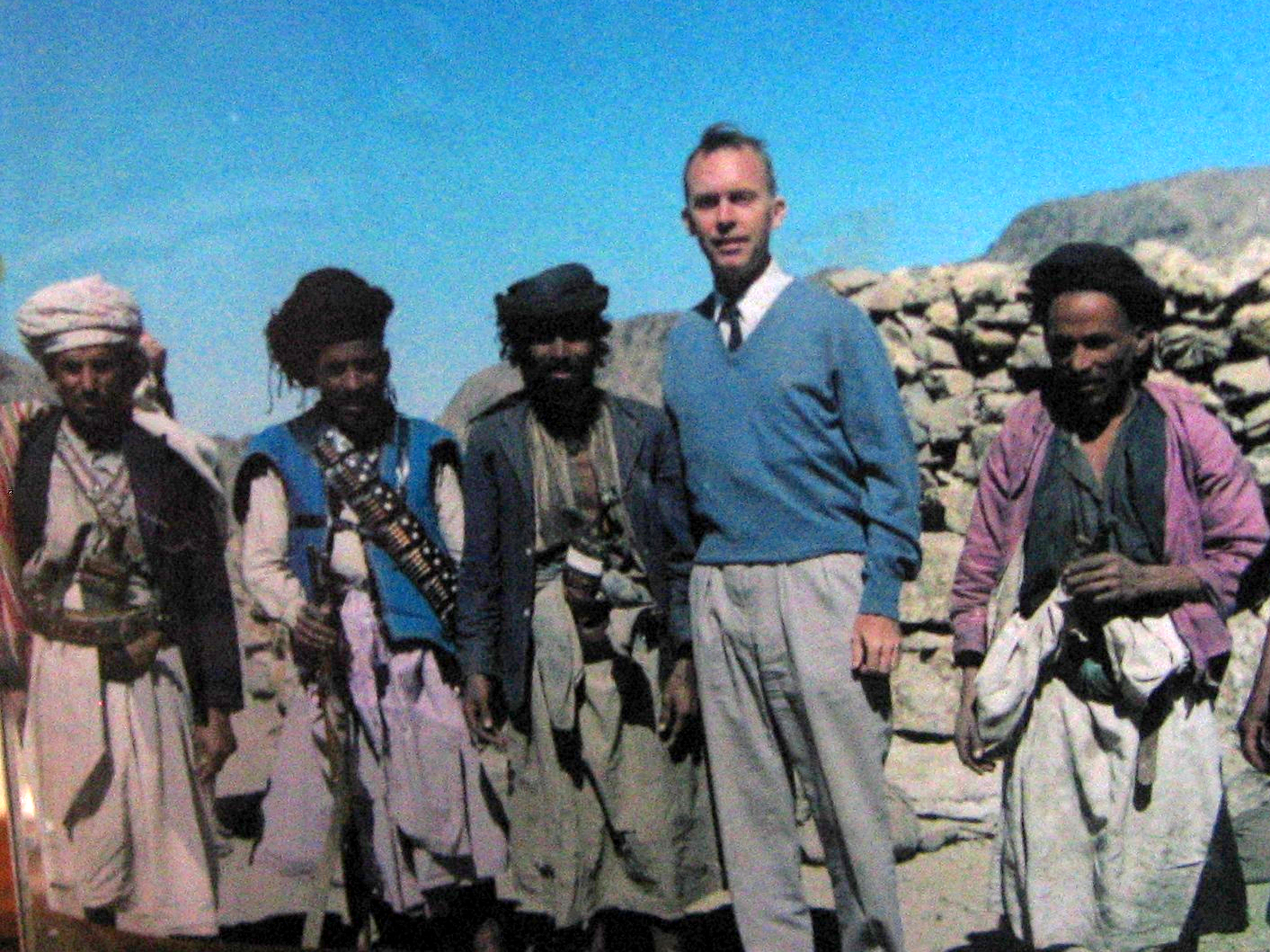
- Macdonald (2nd from rt.) posing alongside Yemeni mountain rebels
- Born: January 19, 1925; Ottawa, Ontario, Canada
- Died: June 28, 2022 (aged 97); Ottawa, Ontario, Canada
- Education: Queen's University; University of Toronto
- Years active: United States; 1962–63
- Employer: Trade Commissioner Service
- Website: Thistle Express

Ian Verner Macdonald (January 19, 1925 – June 28, 2022) was a Canadian trade diplomat and entrepreneur, known for his controversial associations with far-right figures and groups.

== Career diplomat and advocate ==
Macdonald served as Canada's senior trade commissioner in Sri Lanka, the United States, and Lebanon in the 1970s.

As President of the Iraqi-Canadian Friendship Association in the 1990s, he spoke at conferences in Montreal, Moscow and Baghdad opposing the sanctions and the use of depleted uranium munitions against Iraqi civilians.

In 1984, the Royal Canadian Mounted Police investigated allegations that Macdonald had given confidential Canadian trade documents to the government of Iraq.

== Associations ==
In 1987, Macdonald, who had business dealings with Libya since 1970, was asked by Palestinian-American Mousa Hawamda, a Libyan agent, to organise a Canadian delegation to Tripoli to commemorate the American bombing of Libya the previous year. Macdonald agreed and recruited a contingent of 96 members, among whom were representatives of the far-left and far-right.

In March 1989, he and Ingrid Beisner organized a sold-out speaking engagement for controversial author David Irving at the Chateau Laurier in Ottawa. In September of that year, author Warren Kinsella wrote an article titled "The Somewhat Right of Centre Views of Ian Verner Macdonald" for Ottawa Magazine.

In the early 1990s, Macdonald permitted white supremacist rallies, as well as camps by neo-Nazi skinheads and Aryan Nations groups, to be held on his property. He was a friend of James Alexander McQuirter, leader of the Canadian Knights of the Ku Klux Klan, in the 1980s.

Kinsella published the book Unholy Alliances in 1992 and devoted Chapter 5 of the work to detailing his allegations about Macdonald's personal views. He also wrote Web of Hate in 1994, and accused Macdonald of being a "fascist" and "anti-Semite", claiming that Macdonald's friendship with McQuirter linked Irving to the KKK.

In 1992, Ottawa's Frank Magazine described Macdonald as a "neo-nazi supporter", which he denied.

In 1996, Kinsella took part in a Canadian Broadcasting Corporation (CBC) radio call-in program wherein he stated that Macdonald "provided rhetorical and material support to the Canadian Knights of the Ku Klux Klan, and ... provided connections between Ku Klux Klan leaders and the Government of Libya." Kinsella also stated that the Libyan government "provided funding to far right groups in Canada to carry out illegal acts." Macdonald subsequently engaged litigation lawyer Doug Christie to sue the CBC and Kinsella for libel. The case was dismissed on the grounds that the statements were not defamatory and that the claim was filed more than six weeks after the broadcast. The presiding justice wrote, "It is clear from the evidence that Macdonald was known for his anti-Semitic, racist views and friends, and for being at least an admirer of the KKK. Nothing that Kinsella said affected that reputation. Nothing he said alluded to any criminality."

The ruling was upheld on appeal by the Court of Appeal for Ontario on October 19, 2011, and an application to the Supreme Court was rejected.

"Sympathetic? In a way...[the KKK] are harassed to a certain extent and I think they should be allowed to have freedom of expression"

— Ian Macdonald

Macdonald wrote many letters to the editor on Zionism, World War II, the 1996 American attacks on Iraq, the September 11 attacks, the 2011 war in Libya, the removal of a daughter from her mother who espoused Neo-Nazism, immigration, gun control, and what he called the subversion of the political process in Canada. He was a member of the Royal Canadian Legion.

== Author ==
In 2008, Macdonald, a collector of paper antiques, published Ottawa - The Golden Years, an album of 2,144 rare images from the Victorian era. A copy was presented to Queen Elizabeth II who welcomed the book into the Buckingham Palace Library.

He published in 2010 the Star Weekly at War, an album of vivid wartime covers of the magazine.

== Personal life ==
Macdonald died in Ottawa on June 28, 2022, at the age of 97.
