= Dick Jackson =

English footballer and manager

Personal information
- Full name: Richard Jackson
- Date of birth: c. 1878
- Place of birth: Middlesbrough, England
- Position: Central defender

Senior career*
Years	Team	Apps	(Gls)
18??–1898	Middlesbrough	?	(?)
1898–1905	Sunderland	161	(10)

Managerial career
- 1912–1919: Darlington
- * Club domestic league appearances and goals

Dick Jackson (born c. 1878) was an English footballer and manager who played for Middlesbrough and Sunderland as a Central defender and later managed the English football club Darlington from 1912 to 1919. Under his management, Darlington won the North Eastern League title in 1913.
