= Billy Race =

English footballer

Personal information
- Full name: William Race
- Date of birth: 5 February 1896
- Place of birth: Horden, England
- Date of death: 1972 (aged 75–76)
- Position: Outside forward

Senior career*
Years	Team	Apps	(Gls)
- Spennymoor United
1926–1928	Darlington	40	(8)
- Spennymoor United
1929–1931	Hartlepools United	19	(2)
- Horden Colliery Welfare
- * Club domestic league appearances and goals

William Race (5 February 1896 – 1972) was an English footballer who scored 10 goals from 59 appearances in the Football League playing on the wing for Darlington and Hartlepools United in the 1920s and 1930s. He also played non-league football for clubs including Spennymoor United and Horden Colliery Welfare. According to the Derby Daily Telegraph in 1927, he was "small, yet makes for this with an elusive trickiness".
