= Tony Isaacs =

English footballer

Personal information
- Full name: Anthony Brian Isaacs
- Date of birth: 8 April 1973 (age 53)
- Place of birth: Middlesbrough, England
- Position: Midfielder

Youth career
- –: Darlington

Senior career*
Years	Team	Apps	(Gls)
1991–1994	Darlington	51	(2)
–	Bishop Auckland		
- * Club domestic league appearances and goals

Anthony Brian Isaacs (born 8 April 1973) is an English former footballer who made 51 appearances in the Football League playing as a midfielder for Darlington. He also played non-league football for Bishop Auckland.
