= Joe Mellan =

English footballer (1902–1982)

Personal information
- Full name: Joseph Mead Mellan
- Date of birth: 9 July 1902
- Place of birth: Bill Quay, England
- Date of death: 1982 (aged 79–80)
- Position: Full-back

Senior career*
Years	Team	Apps	(Gls)
1922–1923	Barrow	0	(0)
1923–1924	Felling Colliery		
1924–1928	Darlington	31	(0)
1928–1929	Torquay United	10	(0)
1929–1932	Jarrow		
1932–1934	North Shields		
1934–1935	Gateshead	18	(0)
Total		59	(0)
- * Club domestic league appearances and goals

Joseph Mead Mellan (9 July 1902 – 1982) was an English footballer who played in the Football League for Darlington, Gateshead and Torquay United.
