= Bill Smith (footballer, born 1938) =

Scottish footballer

Personal information
- Date of birth: 23 December 1938 (age 87)
- Place of birth: Aberdeen, Scotland
- Position: Inside forward

Senior career*
Years	Team	Apps	(Gls)
- Banks O' Dee
1962–1963	Raith Rovers	9	(2)
1963–1964	Darlington	26	(7)
–	Nairn County		
- * Club domestic league appearances and goals

Bill Smith (born 23 December 1938) is a Scottish former footballer who played in the Scottish Football League for Raith Rovers and in the English Football League for Darlington in the 1960s. An inside forward, he also played in Scotland for Banks O' Dee and Nairn County.
