= Reg Siddle =

English footballer (1906–1995)

Personal information
- Full name: Reginald Nevison Siddle
- Date of birth: 15 June 1906
- Place of birth: Darlington, England
- Date of death: 10 January 1995 (aged 88)
- Place of death: Northampton, England
- Height: 5 ft 8 in (1.73 m)
- Positions: Inside right; right half

Senior career*
Years	Team	Apps	(Gls)
- Albert Hill
1929–1933	Darlington	31	(8)
1933–193?	Spennymoor United		
- * Club domestic league appearances and goals

Reginald Nevison Siddle (15 June 1906 – 10 January 1995) was an English footballer who made 31 appearances in the Football League playing at inside right or right half for Darlington. He went on to play non-league football for Spennymoor United.

== Life and career ==
Siddle was born in Darlington, County Durham, in 1906. He was the youngest child of Ann Siddle and her husband Reuben, an engine fitter with the North Eastern Railway, who died when Reg was 18 months old.

Siddle played local football for Albert Hill before signing amateur forms with Darlington of the Football League Third Division North. He made his senior debut on 15 March 1930 at home to Barrow, coming in at inside right after Paddy Wrightson's departure for Manchester City. The Athletic News reported that he improved after an uncertain start, and he scored as Darlington won 4–0. He played in the remaining eight matches of the season and scored three more goals, including one in a 3–3 draw with South Shields F.C. and the second goal in a 2–1 win away to Crewe Alexandra. He began the 1930–31 season in the North-Eastern League team, had a run of four matches in the league side standing in for Francis Wallace at inside left, and another six matches late on in which he scored twice. Siddle began the following season in the league side: he scored in each of the first three matches – the first was later expunged when opponents Wigan Borough folded – but was dropped after five goalless appearances. He signed on again for 1932–33, but played much more for the reserves than the first team, to the extent that he was selected for a North-Eastern League team to face a Durham Amateur XI in April 1933 as part of the Durham FA's jubilee celebrations.

He was released by Darlington and signed for North-Eastern League club Spennymoor United, where he played regularly at right half, sometimes covering at right back. He was a member of the Spennymoor team that began their 1936–37 FA Cup campaign in the preliminary round and progressed through four qualifying rounds and two rounds proper before losing heavily to First Division club West Bromwich Albion in the third round proper. The team also finished as North-Eastern League runners up, behind Sunderland Reserves. At the end of the season, when manager Charles Sutton moved on to North-Eastern League rivals Horden Colliery Welfare, Siddle was reported to be among a group of Spennymoor players who followed suit; he was also reported to be the only professional to remain with Spennymoor after their switch to the Football League. It is unclear with whom (or whether) his career continued.

The 1939 Register finds Siddle working as a heating engineer and living with his wife, Edith née Green, whom he married in 1931, and a young child in Geneva Gardens, Darlington. He died in Northampton, Northamptonshire, in 1995 at the age of 88.
