= Charles Coates (footballer) =

English footballer (1912–1991)

Personal information
- Full name: Charles Coates
- Date of birth: 18 April 1912
- Place of birth: Esh Winning, England
- Date of death: 1991 (aged 79)
- Place of death: Durham Northern, England
- Height: 5 ft 4 in (1.63 m)
- Position: Forward

Senior career*
Years	Team	Apps	(Gls)
- Hamsteels
1931–1934	Darlington	46	(9)
1934–1937	Spennymoor United		
1937–19??	Horden Colliery Welfare		
- * Club domestic league appearances and goals

Charles Coates (18 April 1912 – 1991) was an English footballer who made 46 appearances in the Football League playing as a left-sided forward for Darlington in the 1930s. He also played non-league football in the north east of England, for Hamsteels, Spennymoor United and Horden Colliery Welfare.

== Life and career ==
Coates was born in 1912 in Esh Winning, County Durham. He played local football for Hamsteels before signing for Darlington of the Football League Third Division North in 1931. He played and scored for the reserve team in the North-Eastern League, and on 23 January 1932, he made his first-team debut and scored in a 6–3 win against local rivals Hartlepools United in which "Wellock, Grieve and Coates shot at every conceivable opportunity, on the half turn, the volley, the half-volley, and on occasions when their backs were turned to the goal". He scored again in the next match, a 3–1 win against Rochdale, and retained a place in the forward line, mainly at inside left for the rest of the season. He played in the first five matches of 1932–33, four defeats and a draw, and then was out of the side until December, when he became the seventh player to occupy the outside-left position, and the first to settle in it. He finished the season with five goals from 28 league matches as Darlington finished bottom of the table. Coates was one of just five players on Darlington's retained list, published in May 1933 before their application for re-election was considered. The club were duly re-elected, and appointed a new manager, George Collins, who brought in forwards of his own choosing, including John Middleton, Jerry Best – who became one of the club's all-time top scorers – and Dave Edgar, who took over the outside-left position. Coates appeared just twice, and was given a free transfer at the end of the season.

He returned to non-league football with Spennymoor United of the North-Eastern League, where he settled at outside right. By February 1935, negotiations for his return to the Football League with Chesterfield were reported to be at an advanced stage, but no move happened. In September, Coates was included in the Rest of the North-Eastern League team for the annual fixture against the reigning champions, in this case Middlesbrough Reserves. He was a regular in the Spennymoor team that began their 1936–37 FA Cup campaign in the preliminary round and progressed through four qualifying rounds and two rounds proper before losing heavily to First Division club West Bromwich Albion in the third round proper. The team also finished as North-Eastern League runners up, behind Sunderland Reserves.

In May 1937, the long-serving secretary-manager of Spennymoor United, Charles Sutton, resigned to take up the position of manager of another North-Eastern League club, Horden Colliery Welfare. Several of Spennymoor's players, including Coates, followed him. He went one better with his new club, finishing a point ahead of Sunderland Reserves at the top of the 1937–38 North-Eastern League, and accepted terms for the coming season. Horden's attempt to emulate Spennymoor's FA Cup run in the 1938–39 edition fell one round short, when they lost to Third Division Newport County in the second round proper. Once eliminated from the Cup, Coates received – and rejected – an offer of first-team football from Second Division club Bradford, preferring to continue as a part-timer with Horden. A couple of years earlier, he had been reported to have "often attracted attention for his speed and wholehearted play, but he is one of those who might have gone further ahead, but prefers to play with Spennymoor." He signed on again for Horden for the 1939–40 season, which had hardly begun when the outbreak of the Second World War put a stop to competitive football.

The 1939 Register finds Coates, his wife, Elizabeth née Fordham, whom he married in 1933, and their two young children living in Taylor Street, Quebec, County Durham, with Elizabeth's father John, a coal miner. Coates was working as a lorry driver. Coates's death at the age of 79 was registered in the fourth quarter of 1991 in the Durham Northern registration district.
