= Steve Ball (footballer, born 1973) =

English footballer

Personal information
- Date of birth: 22 November 1973 (age 52)
- Place of birth: Leeds, England
- Position: Midfielder

Youth career
- Leeds United

Senior career*
Years	Team	Apps	(Gls)
1992–199?	Darlington	42	(3)
–	Cork City		
–	Farsley Celtic		
–	Emley		
199?–2001	Bradford Park Avenue		
2001–2002	Harrogate Town		
2002–2004	Farsley Celtic		
2004–2006	Guiseley		
2006–20??	Bradford Park Avenue		
- * Club domestic league appearances and goals

Steve Ball (born 22 November 1973) is an English former footballer who made 42 appearances in the Football League playing as a midfielder for Darlington. He began his career as a trainee with Leeds United, played briefly in Ireland for Cork City, and went on to play non-league football for clubs including Farsley Celtic, Emley, Bradford Park Avenue, Harrogate Town, and Guiseley.
