= Maurice Peddelty =

English footballer

Personal information
- Full name: John Maurice Peddelty
- Date of birth: 23 May 1950 (age 76)
- Place of birth: Carlisle, England
- Position: Midfielder

Youth career
- Carlisle United

Senior career*
Years	Team	Apps	(Gls)
1968–1970	Carlisle United	13	(1)
1970–1972	Darlington	56	(1)
- South Shields
- * Club domestic league appearances and goals

John Maurice Peddelty (born 23 May 1950) is an English former footballer who made 69 appearances in the Football League playing as a midfielder for Carlisle United and Darlington. He also played non-league football for clubs including South Shields.

Peddelty joined Samuel King's School, in Alston, Cumbria, as deputy head in September 1990, was appointed headteacher in September 2000, and retired from that post in December 2008.
