= Tommy Barbour =

Scottish footballer

Personal information
- Full name: Thomas Parkhill Barbour
- Date of birth: 13 November 1887
- Place of birth: Largs, Scotland
- Date of death: 29 August 1967 (aged 79)
- Place of death: Marlpool, England
- Height: 5 ft 8 1/2 in (1.74 m)
- Positions: Wing half; full back

Senior career*
Years	Team	Apps	(Gls)
- Kilbirnie Ladeside
1908–1921	Derby County	273	(3)
1921–1922	Darlington	29	(0)
1922–19??	Burton All Saints		
- * Club domestic league appearances and goals

Thomas Parkhill Barbour (13 November 1887 – 29 August 1967) was a Scottish professional footballer who played as a wing half or full back. He played in the Football League for Derby County and Darlington.

== Playing career ==
Born in Largs, Ayrshire, Barbour played junior football with Kilbirnie Ladeside. He joined English club Derby County in July 1908, despite Kilbirnie having previously agreed to sell him to Woolwich Arsenal. He spent thirteen years with Derby, winning the Football League Second Division title twice, in 1911–12 and 1914–15. During the first title-winning season, he was part of a defence that set a club record of six consecutive matches without conceding a goal. His time at Derby was disrupted by military service during the First World War, when he served as a private with the Derbyshire Yeomanry at Gallipoli and in Egypt and Italy.

Barbour joined Darlington in 1921. He was part of the club's first Football League team, but left after a year as he was denied permission to train in Derby, where he had become a publican. He then signed for Burton All Saints in the Birmingham and District League.

== After football ==
Barbour continued as a publican after retiring from playing, later running the Jolly Colliers pub in Heanor, Derbyshire. He died at Marlpool, near Heanor, on 29 August 1967.

== Honours ==
Derby County

- Football League Second Division: 1911–12, 1914–15
