= Bobby Sinclair =

Scottish footballer

Personal information
- Full name: Robert Dunlop Sinclair
- Date of birth: 29 June 1915
- Place of birth: Winchburgh, Scotland
- Date of death: 2 July 1993 (aged 78)
- Place of death: Darlington, England
- Position: Outside right

Senior career*
Years	Team	Apps	(Gls)
–	Heart of Midlothian	0	(0)
–	Musselburgh Athletic		
–	Falkirk		
1939–1946	Chesterfield (Note: Although appearances in the abandoned 1939–40 Football League season are included in Joyce's Football League Records, most statistical sources, including omit them.)	0	(0)
1946–1948	Darlington	68	(11)
- * Club domestic league appearances and goals

Robert Dunlop Sinclair (29 June 1915 – 2 July 1993) was a Scottish professional footballer who played in the Scottish First Division for Falkirk in the 1930s and in the Football League in England for Darlington in the years following the Second World War. He played as an outside right.

== Life and career ==
Sinclair was born in Winchburgh, West Lothian. As a youngster, he was on the books of Heart of Midlothian, but never played in competitive first-team football for the club. He went on to play for junior club Musselburgh Athletic before joining First Division club Falkirk in January 1938. He made what the Scotsman described as "quite a promising debut" in the Scottish Cup defeat of St Mirren on 12 February, and in the absence of several regular players through injury, made his Scottish First Division debut the following week, in a 2–0 home defeat to Motherwell. He opened the scoring as Falkirk beat Second Division Albion Rovers in the next round of the Cup, and scored again in a 4–2 win away to Hibernian.

At the end of the 1938–39 season, Falkirk intended to retain Sinclair, but they accepted a £475 offer for his services from English Second Division club Chesterfield, and Sinclair became one of twelve new arrivals ahead of the 1939–40 season. He played in Chesterfield's first two matches before the Football League was abandoned for the duration of the Second World War, and played for the club in wartime competitions (he also guested for Plymouth Argyle) and in the 1945–46 FA Cup, but moved on to Third Division North club Darlington during the 1946 close season. He remained with Darlington for two seasons, scoring 11 goals from 68 League appearances.

Sinclair died in Darlington in 1993 at the age of 78.
