= James McGiffen =

English footballer

Personal information
- Full name: James McGiffen
- Date of birth: 30 January 1904
- Place of birth: South Bank, England
- Date of death: 3 August 1929 (aged 25)
- Place of death: Stockton-on-Tees, England
- Position: Outside left

Senior career*
Years	Team	Apps	(Gls)
19??–1927	Stockton		
1927–1929	Darlington	23	(4)
- * Club domestic league appearances and goals

James McGiffen (30 January 1904 – 3 August 1929) was an English professional footballer who played as an outside left in the Football League for Darlington. He also played non-league football as an amateur for Stockton.

== Life and career ==
McGiffen, the third child of John McGiffen, an iron worker, and his wife Alice, was born in 1904 in South Bank, in the North Riding of Yorkshire, and raised in Stockton-on-Tees, County Durham.

By 1924, he was playing football for his hometown club, the amateur club Stockton F.C.; he scored in a 9–4 defeat to Ferryhill Athletic on the last day of the 1923–24 Northern League season. The Daily Express preview of Stockton's Amateur Cup tie against London Caledonians in 1926 described the youthful McGiffen as "very fast and tricky, with a penchant for goals". He helped Stockton win the Northern League Challenge Cup in 1926–27, before leaving the club at the end of the season to turn professional with Third Division North club Darlington.

McGiffen scored in Darlington's 9–3 win against Lincoln City in January 1928, and according to the Burnley Express, he was the pick of their forwards as he scored twice in a 4–2 defeat of Nelson in April. By the end of his second season with the club, McGiffen had made 23 League appearances and scored four times. He was included on Darlington's retained list, and was reported to have signed on again for the coming season.

At the end of July, he underwent a mastoid operation in Stockton Hospital; he died there three days later, on 3 August, at the age of 25.
