= Iain MacDonald (businessman) =

Irish entrepreneur

Iain MacDonald is an Irish entrepreneur. He is the founder of Perlico, an Irish telecommunications company.

== Education ==
MacDonald studied economics and information studies at Blackrock College and University College Dublin.

== Career ==
MacDonald started his career as a salesman at Intergraph, a software company in Dublin.

MacDonald founded Perlico in 2003, an Irish consumer telecommunications company, and later sold it to Vodafone Ireland in a 2007 deal reportedly worth €80 million contingent on subsequent earnings.

In 2009, MacDonald founded "Weeedle", later renamed SkillPages, a skills-based social network.
