= Norman Callender =

English footballer

Personal information
- Full name: Norman Callender
- Date of birth: 9 June 1924
- Place of birth: Newburn, England
- Date of death: 1990 (aged 65–66) (Note: Callender's death was registered in the third quarter of 1990, in the Northallerton registration district, which covers Northallerton, North Yorkshire, and surrounding area.)
- Place of death: Northallerton, Yorkshire, England
- Position: Wing half

Senior career*
Years	Team	Apps	(Gls)
1946–1949	Darlington	27	(1)
1949–195?	Horden Colliery Welfare		
- * Club domestic league appearances and goals

Norman Callender (9 June 1924 – 1990) was an English footballer who made 27 appearances in the Football League playing as a wing half for Darlington in the 1940s.

Callender joined Darlington while stationed in the area during the war, and was still a serving soldier when he began playing for the club: he had to drop out of the team in February 1947 after he was posted to the Middle East. After leaving Darlington, he signed for Horden Colliery Welfare, for whom he played until at least the 1951–52 season.

He later became a civil servant with the Ministry of Defence and moved into refereeing in 1955. While based in Richmond in North Yorkshire he became a Football League linesman in 1962 and was promoted to the Referees List in 1965 where he remained until 1968. He is one of very few former professional players to have achieved this distinction.
