= Dave Wakefield =

English footballer

Personal information
- Full name: David Wakefield
- Date of birth: 15 January 1965
- Place of birth: South Shields, County Durham, England
- Position: Midfielder

Youth career
- 19??–1983: Darlington

Senior career*
Years	Team	Apps	(Gls)
1983–1984	Darlington	22	(0)
1984	Torquay United	10	(1)
- South Shields
- * Club domestic league appearances and goals

David Wakefield (born 15 January 1965) is an English former footballer who played as a midfielder in the Football League for Darlington and Torquay United and in non-league football for South Shields.
