= Andrew Welch (theatre producer) =

Theatre producer (born 1949)

- Born: 5 February 1949
- Occupation: British theatre producer

Andrew Richard Welch FRSA (born 5 February 1949) is a prominent British theatre producer.

Welch was educated at Bedford School and at Swansea University. Between 1998 and 2002 he was artistic director of the Chichester Festival and the Chichester Festival Theatre. He was awarded an honorary MA by the University of Chichester in 2002. He has been described by The Daily Telegraph as the "unsung hero of British theatre".
