= Mike Boyle (footballer) =

English footballer (1908–>1938)

Personal information
- Full name: Michael John Boyle
- Date of birth: 11 October 1908
- Place of birth: Bearpark, County Durham, England
- Height: 5 ft 9 in (1.75 m)
- Position: Full back

Senior career*
Years	Team	Apps	(Gls)
- Bearpark
1931–1933	Bolton Wanderers	13	(0)
1933–1935	Reading	16	(0)
1936–1937	Exeter City	23	(0)
1937–1939	Darlington	74	(5)
1939–19??	York City	0	(0)
- * Club domestic league appearances and goals

Michael John Boyle (11 October 1908 – after 1938) was an English footballer who made 126 appearances in the Football League playing as a full back for Bolton Wanderers, Reading, Exeter City and Darlington in the 1930s. He played three times for York City in the 1939–40 Football League season abandoned because of the Second World War.
