= John Maughan (footballer) =

English footballer

Personal information
- Date of birth: 25 July 1904
- Place of birth: Byker, England
- Position: Goalkeeper

Senior career*
Years	Team	Apps	(Gls)
- Pandon Temperance
1925–1927	Darlington	28	(0)
1927–1929	Doncaster Rovers	89	(0)
1929–1930	Bury	7	(0)
- * Club domestic league appearances and goals

John Maughan (25 July 1904 – after 1929) was an English footballer who made 124 appearances in the Football League playing as a goalkeeper for Darlington, Doncaster Rovers and Bury in the 1920s.
