= James Grieve (footballer) =

English footballer (1908–1995)

Personal information
- Full name: James Purvis Grieve
- Date of birth: 19 January 1908
- Place of birth: Walkergate, England
- Date of death: 1995 (aged 87)
- Place of death: Newcastle upon Tyne, England
- Height: 5 ft 9 in (1.75 m)
- Position: Centre forward

Senior career*
Years	Team	Apps	(Gls)
19??–1931	Wallsend		
1931–1933	Darlington	29	(13)
1933–1939	Annfield Plain		
- * Club domestic league appearances and goals

James Purvis Grieve (19 January 1908 – 1995) was an English professional footballer who scored 13 goals from 29 appearances in the Football League playing as a centre forward for Darlington in the 1930s. He joined Darlington from non-league club Wallsend, and went on to play non-league football for Annfield Plain.

== Life and career ==
James Purvis Grieve was born on 19 January 1908 in Walkergate, Northumberland. He played football for North-Eastern League club Wallsend before joining Darlington of the Football League Third Division North in 1931. He played for Darlington's reserve team in the North-Eastern League before making his Football League debut on 24 October 1931 away to Carlisle United, standing in for the injured Maurice Wellock. Darlington won 2–0, Grieve scored both goals, and he caught the eye of the Lancashire Evening Post by his "pushfulness and sense of leadership". Wellock resumed his place after two matches out, but when Grieve was brought in for an FA Cup tie against Carlisle in December, this time alongside Wellock, who moved to inside right to accommodate Grieve at centre forward, he scored again, and scored another in the next league match.

In the second half of the season Grieve took over as first choice at centre forward, and contributed a further ten goals from 20 matches, including a hat-trick in a 6–3 win against local rivals Hartlepools United in which "Wellock, Grieve, and Coates shot at every conceivable opportunity, on the half turn, the volley, the half-volley, and on occasions when their backs were turned to the goal". Darlington finished 11th in the table. He accepted terms for a second season, but an attempt to convert him to outside left was unsuccessful: he played little and without scoring, and was given a free transfer.

He then returned to North-Eastern League football with Annfield Plain, where he flourished. In November 1934, he turned down an offer from the FA Cup-holders, Manchester City, preferring to keep his job in Newcastle with the London and North Eastern Railway (LNER), and he stayed with Annfield Plain until 1939. The 1939 Register shows the unmarried Grieve working as a labourer for the LNER and living in Shields Road, Newcastle, with his parents and four younger siblings. His death at the age of 87 was registered in Newcastle in June 1995.

== Sources ==
- Tweddle, Frank (2000). The Definitive Darlington F.C. Nottingham: SoccerData. ISBN 978-1-899468-15-7.
