= Ken Ellis (footballer, born 1948) =

English footballer (1948–1992)

Personal information
- Full name: Kenneth Ellis
- Date of birth: 29 May 1948
- Place of birth: Sunderland, England
- Date of death: 1992 (aged 43–44) (Note: Ellis's death was registered in the second quarter of 1992, in the Central Cleveland registration district, which covers Middlesbrough and surrounding area.)
- Place of death: Central Cleveland, England
- Height: 5 ft 7 1/2 in (1.71 m)
- Positions: Defender; forward

Senior career*
Years	Team	Apps	(Gls)
1969–1971	Scarborough		
1971–1972	Hartlepool	34	(4)
1972–1973	Racing Jet		
1973–1978	AS Oostende		
1979–1980	Darlington	21	(0)
1980–1981	Goole Town		
- * Club domestic league appearances and goals

Kenneth Ellis (29 May 1948 – 1992) was an English footballer who played in the Football League for Hartlepool and Darlington. He also played in Belgium for Racing Jet and AS Oostende, and in English non-league football for Scarborough and Goole Town. He played as either defender or forward.
