= Johnny Dowson =

English footballer

Personal information
- Full name: John Simpson Dowson
- Date of birth: 18 September 1926
- Place of birth: Ashington, England
- Date of death: 1989 (aged 62–63)
- Position: Winger

Senior career*
Years	Team	Apps	(Gls)
	Manchester City	0	(0)
1950–1952	Peterborough United	68	(39)
1952–1954	Darlington	65	(11)
- Ashington
- * Club domestic league appearances and goals

John Simpson "Johnny" Dowson (18 September 1926 – 1989) was an English footballer who scored 11 goals from 65 appearances in the Football League playing on the wing for Darlington in the 1950s. He was on the books of Manchester City, but never played for them in the League, scored 39 goals from 68 appearances in the Midland League for Peterborough United, and also played non-league football for Ashington.
