= Ronnie Steel =

English footballer

Personal information
- Full name: Ronald Steel
- Date of birth: 3 June 1929
- Place of birth: Newburn, Northumberland, England
- Date of death: 1 November 2009 (aged 80)
- Positions: Outside forward; inside forward

Senior career*
Years	Team	Apps	(Gls)
–	Bishop Auckland		
1950–1952	Darlington	66	(5)
1952–1955	Headington United	97	(21)
1955–1957	Bedford Town	57	(13)
1958–1959	Banbury Spencer		
1961–1962	Witney Town		
- * Club domestic league appearances and goals

Ronald Steel (3 June 1929 – 1 November 2009) was an English footballer who made 66 appearances in the Football League playing on the wing for Darlington. He also played non-league football for clubs including Bishop Auckland, Headington United, with whom he won the 1952–53 Southern League title, Bedford Town, Banbury Spencer and Witney Town.
