= Joe Turner (footballer, born 1931) =

English footballer

Personal information
- Full name: Joseph Turner
- Date of birth: 21 March 1931
- Place of birth: Barnsley, West Riding of Yorkshire
- Date of death: 8 February 2008 (aged 76)
- Place of death: Barnsley, South Yorkshire, England
- Position: Goalkeeper

Senior career*
Years	Team	Apps	(Gls)
- Denaby United
1954–1957	Stockport County	79	(0)
1957–1960	Darlington	68	(0)
1960–1961	Scunthorpe United	22	(0)
1961–1962	Barnsley	7	(0)
- Goole Town
- * Club domestic league appearances and goals

Joseph Turner (21 March 1931 - 8 February 2008) was an English footballer who made 176 appearances in the Football League playing for Stockport County, Darlington, Scunthorpe United and Barnsley in the 1950s and early 1960s. A goalkeeper, he also played non-league football for Denaby United and Goole Town.
