= Ian McDonald (footballer, born 1951) =

Scottish footballer

Personal information
- Full name: Ian McDonald
- Date of birth: 5 February 1951 (age 75)
- Place of birth: Inverness, Scotland
- Position: Midfielder

Youth career
- Wolverhampton Wanderers

Senior career*
Years	Team	Apps	(Gls)
1968–1970	Wolverhampton Wanderers	0	(0)
1970–1971	Darlington	25	(3)
–	Whitley Bay		
- * Club domestic league appearances and goals

Ian McDonald (born 5 February 1951) is a Scottish former footballer who made 25 appearances in the Football League playing as a midfielder for Darlington in the 1970s. He was on the books of Wolverhampton Wanderers, without representing them in the League, and went on to play non-league football for Whitley Bay.
