= Joe Scott (footballer, born 1901) =

English footballer

Personal information
- Full name: Joseph Scott
- Date of birth: 15 March 1901
- Place of birth: Newcastle upon Tyne, England
- Date of death: 1972 (aged 70–71)
- Height: 5 ft 6 1/2 in (1.69 m)
- Position: Inside right

Senior career*
Years	Team	Apps	(Gls)
- Pandon Tempest Colliery
1923–1925	Sunderland	2	(0)
1925–1928	Darlington	43	(12)
1928–192?	Ashington	0	(0)
192?–1929	South Shields	1	(0)
- * Club domestic league appearances and goals

Joseph Scott (15 March 1901 – 1972) was an English footballer who scored 12 goals from 46 appearances in the Football League playing as an inside right for Sunderland, Darlington and South Shields in the 1920s. He was also on the books of Ashington without playing for them in the League. His brother Tom also played for Darlington, among several other clubs.
