= Andy Welsh (footballer, born 1917) =

English footballer

Personal information
- Full name: Andrew Welsh
- Date of birth: 28 June 1917
- Place of birth: Annfield, England
- Height: 5 ft 8 in (1.73 m)
- Position: Left back

Senior career*
Years	Team	Apps	(Gls)
1935–1936	Charlton Athletic	0	(0)
1936–1937	Manchester City	0	(0)
1937–1939	Darlington	46	(0)
1945–1946	Northampton Town	0	(0)
- * Club domestic league appearances and goals

Andrew Welsh (28 June 1917 – 1990) was an English footballer who made 46 appearances in the Football League playing as a left back for Darlington in the 1930s. He was on the books of Charlton Athletic, Manchester City and Northampton Town, without playing for them in the League.
