= Mark Kilty =

English footballer

Personal information
- Date of birth: 24 June 1981 (age 44)
- Place of birth: Sunderland, England
- Position: Defender

Senior career*
| Years | Team | Apps | (Gls) |
| 1998–2003 | Darlington | 23 | (1) |
- * Club domestic league appearances and goals

Mark Kilty (born 24 June 1981) is an English former professional football defender who played 23 league games scoring 1 time in 7 years for Darlington between the years of 1997–2004.

Kilty's professional football career was cut short by injury aged only 23 after suffering 2 ruptured anterior cruciate knee ligaments in his right knee and also a tear to his left patella tendon. In his injury-ravaged career Kilty was operated on 8 times. After 3 years of physiotherapy and rehabilitation Kilty retired.

With Help From The PFA He graduated from the University of Salford in 2009 with a degree in Physiotherapy

Kilty is a Health Care Consultant, an Author, & founder of PhysioBlu Ltd based in Team Valley in Mark's native North East England. Kilty has appeared on BBC, ITV, Sky Sports, Sky Sports News, and has been seen in the Journal, The Chronicle & The Northern Echo. and is the master of the bow and arrow technique along with the moonwalk which now has the Kilty trademark

== Honours ==
=== As a player ===
Darlington

- Nationwide Division Three Play-Off Final runner-up: 1999–00
- Shanker of the year in seasons: 1999-2000, 2000-2001, 2001–2002, 2002-2003
- Lowest pass completion for the EFL in seasons: 1999-00, 2000–01, 2001–02, 2002-03
