= Robert Goddard (footballer) =

English footballer

Personal information
- Full name: Robert James Goddard
- Date of birth: 22 November 1898
- Place of birth: Bristol, England
- Date of death: 1968 (aged 72–73)
- Position: Goalkeeper

Senior career*
Years	Team	Apps	(Gls)
1920–1921	Charles Hill		
1921–1924	Bristol City	21	(0)
1924–1925	Reading	0	(0)
Total		21	(0)
- * Club domestic league appearances and goals

Robert James Goddard (22 November 1898 – 1968) was an English footballer who played in the Football League for Bristol City. ==References==
