= List of Darlington F.C. seasons =

Darlington Football Club is an English association football club founded in 1883 and based in the town of Darlington, County Durham. Its first team played in the Northern League from 1889 to 1908 and then in the North-Eastern League until becoming a member of the newly formed Football League Third Division North in 1921. They won that division's title in 1925, and their 15th place in the Second Division in 1926 remains their highest ever league finish, but most of their Football League history was spent in the bottom tier. The club lost its Football League status briefly in 1988 and again in 2010, since when the team has competed in non-league football.

The team's first success in a nationally organised cup competition came in the 1934 Third Division North Cup. They reached the last 16 of the FA Cup twice, and the quarter-final of the League Cup once, in 1968. In the early 1990s they won successive titles, in the Conference in 1990 and the Fourth Division in 1991. In 2011 they won the FA Trophy.

== History ==
Darlington Football Club was founded in 1883 to address the local newspaper's view that there was "no club, urban or rural, sufficiently powerful to worthily represent" the town of Darlington. In their second season, the club's first team won the major regional trophy, the Durham Challenge Cup, and the following season they entered the FA Cup for the first time, only to lose 8–0 to Grimsby Town. In 1889, Darlington were one of the founder members of the Northern League; they won the league title in 1896 and 1900, and reached the semi-final of the FA Amateur Cup in the same two seasons. The club turned professional in 1908 and joined the North-Eastern League. The 1910–11 season saw Darlington reach the last 16 of the FA Cup, progressing through five qualifying rounds to lose to Swindon Town in the third round proper. They won the North-Eastern League in 1913 and 1921, and were invited to join the newly formed Football League Third Division North.

Runners-up in their first season in the Football League, Darlington were Third Division North champions three years later, thus winning promotion to the Second Division. Their 15th-place finish in 1926 remains, as of 2024, their best League performance; they were relegated back to the Third Division in 1927, where they remained until the Second World War put an end to competitive football. They came third in 1929–30, but twice had to apply for re-election to the League, in 1932–33 and 1936–37, after finishing in last place in the section. In 1934, they enjoyed their first success in a nationally organised cup competition, defeating Stockport County 4–3 at Old Trafford to win the Football League Third Division North Cup, and reached the final again two years later. In the 1957–58 season, the club equalled their previous best FA Cup run, reaching the last 16 by defeating Chelsea, Football League champions only three years earlier, in the fourth round. When the regional sections of the Third Division were merged in 1958–59 to form two national divisions, Darlington were placed in the fourth tier.

Darlington won promotion to the Third Division in 1965–66, but for one season only. Their most successful season in the League Cup came in 1967–68: drawn away to Brian Clough's Derby County in the quarter-final, they took the lead, only to lose 5–4. During the 1970s the club had to apply for re-election to the League five times. Darlington spent two seasons in the Third Division in the 1980s; their 13th-place finish in 1986 was a record high since the introduction of the four-division structure. Darlington were relegated from the Football League in 1988–89 after 68 years of continuous membership. They made an immediate return as Conference champions, then won the Fourth Division title in 1990–91, but spent only one season in the third tier before relegation followed.

Darlington lost in both the second and the third rounds of the 1999–2000 FA Cup. Manchester United's decision to play in the FIFA Club World Championship rather than the FA Cup left a space in the third round which the organisers filled by drawing lots from among the 20 teams eliminated in the second. Darlington were the "lucky losers", and were beaten 2–1 by Aston Villa in the third round after losing 3–1 to Gillingham in the second. They came close to a return to the Third Division via the play-offs in 1996 and 2000, and a period of administration in 2008–09 resulted in a 10-point deduction, without which they would again have reached the play-offs. The following season they were relegated to the Conference for the second time, and went on to reach the 2011 FA Trophy Final, in which Chris Senior scored the only goal of the game in the last minute of extra time to defeat Mansfield Town.

In 2011–12, another period of administration forced the termination of players' contracts before a last-minute injection of funding enabled Darlington to complete the season. The new owners' failure to secure a Company Voluntary Arrangement before exiting administration meant the Football Association treated the club as a new club, placed it in the Northern League, required a change of playing name – Darlington 1883 was chosen – and barred it from entry to national competitions. The new club won the 2012–13 Northern League title by a 13-point margin to gain promotion to the Northern Premier League Division One North for 2013–14, followed two years later by consecutive promotions: first to the Premier Division via the play-offs, then to the National League North as 2015–16 Northern Premier League champions. They were unable to make it three in a row when, despite finishing in the playoff positions in 2016–17, ground grading issues prevented their participation, since when they have remained in the National North.

The table details their achievements in senior first-team competitions from their first appearance in the FA Cup in 1885–86 to the end of the most recently completed season.

== Key ==
Key to league record:

- P – Played
- W – Games won
- D – Games drawn
- L – Games lost
- F – Goals for
- A – Goals against
- Pts – Points
- Pos – Final position

Key to colours and symbols:

1st or W	Winners
2nd or F	Runners-up
↑	Promoted
↓	Relegated
♦	Top league scorer in Darlington's division

Key to divisions:

- National N – National League North
- Northern – Northern League
- Northern 1 – Northern League Division 1
- North East – North Eastern League
- NPL – Northern Premier League
- NPL 1N – Northern Premier League Division One North
- Division 2 – Football League Second Division
- Division 3 – Football League Third Division
- Division 3N – Football League Third Division North
- Division 4 – Football League Fourth Division
- Conference – Conference National
- League 2 – Football League Two
- Prelim – Preliminary round
- Group – Group stage
- QR1 – First qualifying round
- QR2 – Second qualifying round, etc.
- R1 – Round 1, etc.
- R1(N) – Round 1 Northern section, etc.
- R1(NE) – Round 1 North-eastern section, etc.
- QF – Quarter-final
- QF(N) – Quarter-final Northern section
- SF – Semi-final
- SF(N) – Semi-final Northern section
- F – Runners-up
- W – Winners

Details of the abandoned 1939–40 Football League and 2020–21 National League North seasons are shown in italics and appropriately footnoted.

== Seasons ==
List of seasons, including league division and statistics, cup results and top scorer
Season	League									FA Cup (Note: Beginning with the 1925–26 season, the FA Cup was structured so that the third round proper contained 64 teams. Prior to that date, the structure had varied, so rounds are not directly comparable to the round of the same name after 1925. For example, in 1892–93, Small Heath's first season in the Football League, there were only three rounds proper before the semifinal, as compared with the current six.)	League Cup (Note: The Football League Cup competition started in the 1960–61 season.)	Other		Top league scorer(s)	
Season	Division (Note: Before the 1921–22 season, when Darlington were first admitted to the Football League, divisions are sorted alphabetically. From that season onwards, divisions are sorted according to their level within the English football league system, and separately from the pre-Football League divisions. Thus the 2012–13 Northern League is sorted separately from the 19th-century Northern League.)	P	W	D	L	F	A	Pts	Pos	FA Cup	League Cup	Competition	Result	Name	Goals
1885–86	—	—	—	—	—	—	—	—	—	R2	—	—	—	—	—
1886–87	—	—	—	—	—	—	—	—	—	R1	—	—	—	—	—
1887–88	—	—	—	—	—	—	—	—	—	R3	—	—	—	—	—
1888–89	—	—	—	—	—	—	—	—	—	QR1	—	—	—	—	—
1889–90	Northern (Note: Darlington were founder members of the Northern League in the 1889–90 season.)	18	7	6	5	46	20	20	5th	QR1	—	—	—	Not known	—
1890–91	Northern	14	7	0	7	25	29	14	5th	QR4	—	—	—	Not known	—
1891–92	Northern	16	2	3	11	17	49	7	9th	QR4	—	—	—	Not known	—
1892–93	Northern	10	2	1	7	11	37	5	6th	QR4	—	—	—	Not known	—
1893–94	Northern	14	7	1	6	25	20	15	4th	QR1	—	FA Amateur Cup	R1	Not known	—
1894–95	Northern	18	11	0	7	56	30	22	4th	QR3	—	FA Amateur Cup	R2	Not known	—
1895–96	Northern	16	10	4	2	53	24	24	1st	Prelim	—	FA Amateur Cup	SF	Not known	—
1896–97	Northern	16	10	2	4	54	35	22	2nd	QR4	—	FA Amateur Cup	R2	Not known	—
1897–98	Northern 1 (Note: From 1887–88 to 1889–1900, the Northern League had two divisions, before reverting to the single-division format.)	16	8	2	6	41	31	18	3rd	QR3	—	FA Amateur Cup	QF	Not known	—
1898–99	Northern 1	16	10	3	3	50	29	23	2nd	QR3	—	FA Amateur Cup	QF	Not known	—
1899–1900	Northern 1	16	12	3	1	42	16	27	1st	QR1	—	FA Amateur Cup	SF	Not known	—
1900–01	Northern	20	11	2	7	55	37	24	3rd	QR2	—	FA Amateur Cup	QF	Not known	—
1901–02	Northern	18	9	4	5	37	22	22	3rd	Prelim	—	FA Amateur Cup	R1	Not known	—
1902–03	Northern	24	10	3	11	34	50	23	6th	QR1	—	FA Amateur Cup	R1	Not known	—
1903–04	Northern	24	11	3	10	48	49	25	6th	QR3	—	FA Amateur Cup	R2	Not known	—
1904–05	Northern	24	9	6	9	38	38	24	4th	QR4	—	FA Amateur Cup	QF	Not known	—
1905–06	Northern	26	12	7	7	47	47	31	4th	QR4	—	FA Amateur Cup	R1	Not known	—
1906–07	Northern	22	9	2	11	30	37	20	7th	QR1	—	FA Amateur Cup	R1	Not known	—
1907–08	Northern	22	9	2	11	39	41	20	9th	QR4	—	FA Amateur Cup	R1	Not known	—
1908–09	North East	34	15	8	11	76	73	38	8th	QR3	—	—	—	Tommy Charlton	16
1909–10	North East	32	16	5	11	59	54	37	5th	QR3	—	—	—	Alec Fraser	17
1910–11	North East	34	19	5	10	79	40	43	4th	R3 (Note: Club's best performance in the FA Cup, reaching the last 16.)	—	—	—	Alec Fraser	17
1911–12	North East	36	23	8	5	84	34	54	3rd	R2	—	—	—	Ginger Owers	19
1912–13	North East	38	31	4	3	116	23	66	1st	QR5	—	—	—	Dick Healey	41
1913–14	North East	38	20	10	8	72	43	50	4th	QR5	—	—	—	Aaron Travis	21
1914–15 (Note: This was the last season before the North-Eastern League and FA Cup were suspended for the remainder of the First World War.)	North East	38	25	4	9	109	38	54	4th	R1	—	—	—	Aaron Travis	40
1919–20	North East	34	24	1	9	93	44	49	2nd	R2	—	—	—	Dick Healey	21
1920–21	North East	38	28	4	6	76	29	60	1st	R1	—	—	—	Bill Hooper	17
1921–22	Division 3N	38	22	6	10	81	37	50	2nd	R1	—	—	—	Bill Hooper	18
1922–23	Division 3N	38	15	10	13	59	46	40	9th	QR6	—	—	—	Bill Hooper	16
1923–24	Division 3N	42	20	8	14	70	53	48	6th	R1	—	—	—	David Brown	27 ♦
1924–25	Division 3N ↑	42	24	10	8	78	33	58	1st	R1	—	—	—	David Brown	39 ♦
1925–26	Division 2	42	14	10	18	72	77	38	15th (Note: Club's best League finishing position.)	R2	—	—	—	Mark Hooper	18
1926–27	Division 2 ↓	42	12	6	24	79	98	30	21st	R4	—	—	—	Tom Ruddy	25
1927–28	Division 3N	42	21	5	16	89	74	47	7th	R3	—	—	—	Bob Gregg	21
1928–29	Division 3N	42	13	7	22	64	88	33	19th	R3	—	—	—	Billy Eden	11
1929–30	Division 3N	42	22	6	14	108	73	50	3rd	R1	—	—	—	Maurice Wellock	34
1930–31	Division 3N	42	16	10	16	71	59	42	11th	R1	—	—	—	Maurice Wellock	23
1931–32	Division 3N	40	17	4	19	66	69	38	11th	R3	—	—	—	Maurice Wellock	14
1932–33	Division 3N	42	10	8	24	66	109	28	22nd	R4	—	—	—	Bob Johnson	15
1933–34	Division 3N	42	13	9	20	70	101	35	16th	R1	—	Football League Third Division North Cup (Note: Darlington won the inaugural Football League Third Division North Cup, defeating Stockport County 4–3 at Manchester United's ground, Old Trafford. Two years later they reached the final again, this time losing at Feethams, their home ground, to Chester by a score of 2–1.)	W	Tom Alderson	16
1934–35	Division 3N	42	21	9	12	80	59	51	5th	R2	—	Football League Third Division North Cup	R1	Jerry Best	31
1935–36	Division 3N	42	17	6	19	74	79	40	12th	R3	—	Football League Third Division North Cup	F	Jerry Best	19
1936–37	Division 3N	42	8	14	20	66	96	30	22nd	R4	—	Football League Third Division North Cup	SF	Albert Brallisford	26
1937–38	Division 3N	42	11	10	21	54	79	32	19th	R1	—	Football League Third Division North Cup	R1	Reg Chester	10
1938–39	Division 3N	42	13	7	22	62	92	33	18th	R2	—	Football League Third Division North Cup	R1	Wilf Feeney	13
1939–40	Division 3N	3	2	1	0	5	2	5	— (Note: The 1939–40 Football League season was abandoned with three matches played when the Second World War began, and the Football League and FA Cup remained suspended for the duration.)	—	—	—	—	Wally Odell	2
1945–46	—	—	—	—	—	—	—	—	—	R2 (Note: Although the Football League did not resume until the 1946–47 season, the FA Cup was contested in 1945–46. From the first round proper to the sixth round (quarter-final), results were determined on aggregate score over two legs.)	—	—	—	—	—
1946–47	Division 3N	42	15	6	21	68	80	36	17th	R2	—	—	—	Harry Clarke	17
1947–48	Division 3N	42	13	13	16	54	70	39	16th	R1	—	—	—	Harry Clarke	14
1948–49	Division 3N	42	20	6	16	83	74	46	4th	R3	—	—	—	Albert Quinn	23
1949–50	Division 3N	42	11	13	18	56	69	35	17th	R1	—	—	—	Albert Quinn	17
1950–51	Division 3N	46	13	13	20	59	77	39	18th	R1	—	—	—	Harry Yates	14
1951–52	Division 3N	46	11	9	26	64	103	31	23rd	R1	—	—	—	Harry Yates	15
1952–53	Division 3N	46	14	6	26	58	96	34	21st	R1	—	—	—	Ken Murray	8
1953–54	Division 3N	46	12	14	20	50	71	38	21st	R1	—	—	—	Les Robson	14
1954–55	Division 3N	46	14	14	18	62	73	42	15th	R3	—	—	—	Dickie Davis	16
1955–56	Division 3N	46	16	9	21	60	73	41	15th	R2	—	—	—	Dickie Davis; Ken Morton	14
1956–57	Division 3N	46	17	8	21	82	95	42	18th	R2	—	—	—	Bill Tulip	32
1957–58	Division 3N	46	17	7	22	78	89	41	20th	R5	—	—	—	Ron Harbertson	15
1958–59	Division 4 (Note: Darlington were placed in the Football League Fourth Division when the regional sections of the Third Division were amalgamated into national Third and Fourth Divisions.)	46	13	16	17	66	68	42	16th	R3	—	—	—	Dave Carr	15
1959–60	Division 4	46	17	9	20	63	73	43	15th	R2	—	—	—	Bobby Baxter	14
1960–61	Division 4	46	18	13	15	78	70	49	7th	R2 (Note: Lost to Hull City only after four replays.)	R3	—	—	Bobby Baxter	16
1961–62	Division 4	44	18	9	17	61	73	45	13th	R1	R1	—	—	Lance Robson	17
1962–63	Division 4	46	19	6	21	72	87	44	12th	R1	R2	—	—	Lance Robson	18
1963–64	Division 4	46	14	12	20	66	93	40	19th	R1	R1	—	—	Ken Allison	15
1964–65	Division 4	46	18	6	22	84	87	42	17th	R3	R2	—	—	Jimmy Lawton	25
1965–66	Division 4 ↑	46	25	9	12	72	53	59	2nd	R2	R4	—	—	Bobby Cummings	23
1966–67	Division 3 ↓	46	13	11	22	47	81	37	22nd	R2	R2	—	—	Bryan Conlon	13
1967–68	Division 4	46	12	17	17	47	53	41	16th	R1	QF (Note: Club's best performance in the League Cup, reaching the quarter-final stage.)	—	—	Bobby Cummings	12
1968–69	Division 4	46	17	18	11	62	45	52	5th	R2	R2	—	—	Allan Gauden	15
1969–70	Division 4	46	13	10	23	53	73	36	22nd	R1	R2	—	—	Ken Hale	8
1970–71	Division 4	46	17	11	18	58	57	45	12th	R2	R2	—	—	Alan Harding	17
1971–72	Division 4	46	14	11	21	64	82	39	19th	R2	R1	—	—	Peter Graham	20
1972–73	Division 4	46	7	15	24	42	85	29	24th	R1	R1	—	—	Peter Graham	11
1973–74	Division 4	46	13	13	20	40	62	39	20th	R1	R2	—	—	Colin Sinclair	9
1974–75	Division 4	46	13	10	23	54	67	36	21st	R2	R1	—	—	Stan Webb	16
1975–76	Division 4	46	14	10	22	48	57	38	20th	R1	R3	—	—	Colin Sinclair	21
1976–77	Division 4	46	18	13	15	59	64	49	11th	R3	R2	—	—	Eddie Rowles	13
1977–78	Division 4	46	14	13	19	52	59	41	19th	R1	R1	—	—	Eddie Rowles; Dennis Wann	7
1978–79	Division 4	46	11	15	20	49	66	37	21st	R3	R3	—	—	John Stone; Alan Walsh	9
1979–80	Division 4	46	9	17	20	50	74	35	22nd	R2	R1	—	—	Alan Walsh	15
1980–81	Division 4	46	19	11	16	65	59	49	8th	R1	R1	—	—	Alan Walsh	22
1981–82	Division 4	46	15	13	18	61	62	58 (Note: The 1981–82 season saw the introduction of three points for a win instead of two.)	13th	R1	R1	—	—	David Speedie	17
1982–83	Division 4	46	13	13	20	61	71	52	17th	R1	R1	—	—	Alan Walsh	18
1983–84	Division 4	46	17	8	21	49	50	59	14th	R4	R2	Associate Members' Cup	R2(N)	Alan Walsh	10
1984–85	Division 4 ↑	46	24	13	9	66	49	85	3rd	R4	R1	Associate Members' Cup	QF(N)	Carl Airey	16
1985–86	Division 3	46	15	13	18	61	78	58	13th	R1	R2	Associate Members' Cup	QF(N)	Garry MacDonald	16
1986–87	Division 3 ↓	46	7	16	23	45	77	37	23rd	R2	R1	Associate Members' Cup	Group	David Currie	12
1987–88	Division 4	46	18	11	17	71	69	65	13th	R1	R2	Associate Members' Cup	QF(N)	David Currie	21
1988–89	Division 4 ↓	46	8	18	20	53	76	42	24th (Note: Relegated from the Football League for the first time since their admission to it in 1922.)	R1	R2	Associate Members' Cup	R1(N)	Gary Worthington	12
1989–90	Conference ↑	42	26	9	7	76	25	87	1st	R3	—	FA Trophy; Conf. League Cup	QF; R3	John Borthwick	19
1990–91	Division 4 ↑	46	22	17	7	68	38	83	1st	R1	R2	Associate Members' Cup	R1(N)	John Borthwick	10
1991–92	Division 3 ↓	46	10	7	29	56	90	37	24th	R2	R1	Associate Members' Cup	Group	Lee Ellison	10
1992–93	Division 3 (Note: When the newly formed FA Premier League split from the Football League, the remaining divisions of the Football League were renumbered upwards, so Darlington were relegated from the old Third Division into the new Third Division.)	42	12	14	16	48	53	50	15th	R1	R1	Football League Trophy	R2(N)	Steve Mardenborough	11
1993–94	Division 3	42	10	11	21	42	64	41	21st	R1	R1	Football League Trophy	R2(N)	Robbie Painter	11
1994–95	Division 3	42	11	8	23	43	57	41	20th	R2	R1	Football League Trophy	R2(N)	Robbie Painter	9
1995–96	Division 3	46	20	18	8	60	42	78	5th (Note: In their first appearance at Wembley, lost 1–0 to Plymouth Argyle in the 1996 Third Division play-off final.)	R2	R1	Football League Trophy	Group	Robbie Blake	11
1996–97	Division 3	46	14	10	22	64	78	52	18th	R2	R2	Football League Trophy	R1(N)	Darren Roberts	16
1997–98	Division 3	46	14	12	20	56	72	54	19th	R3	R1	Football League Trophy	R1(N)	Darren Roberts	12
1998–99	Division 3	46	18	11	17	69	58	65	11th	R2	R1	Football League Trophy	R2(N)	Marco Gabbiadini	23 ♦
1999–2000	Division 3	46	21	16	9	66	36	79	4th (Note: Lost 1–0 to Peterborough United in the 2000 Football League Third Division play-off final.)	R3 (Note: Knocked out in the second round, Darlington progressed to the third round as a "lucky loser" as the FA Cup organising committee drew lots from among the second-round losers to fill the gap in the third-round draw left by Manchester United playing in the FIFA Club World Championship instead.)	R1	Football League Trophy	R1(N)	Marco Gabbiadini	24 ♦
2000–01	Division 3	46	12	13	21	44	56	49	20th	R2	R2	Football League Trophy	QF(N)	Glenn Naylor	11
2001–02	Division 3	46	15	11	20	60	71	56	15th	R3	R1	Football League Trophy	R2(N)	Ian Clark	13
2002–03	Division 3	46	12	18	16	58	59	54	14th	R3	R1	Football League Trophy	R1(N)	Barry Conlon	15
2003–04	Division 3	46	14	11	21	53	61	53	18th	R1	R2	Football League Trophy	R1(N)	Barry Conlon	14
2004–05	League 2	46	20	12	14	57	49	72	8th	R1	R1	Football League Trophy	R1(N)	Clyde Wijnhard	14
2005–06	League 2	46	16	15	15	58	52	63	8th	R1	R1	Football League Trophy	R1(N)	Guylain Ndumbu-Nsungu	10
2006–07	League 2	46	17	14	15	52	56	65	11th	R2	R2	Football League Trophy	SF(N)	Julian Joachim	7
2007–08	League 2	46	22	12	12	67	40	78	6th	R1	R1	Football League Trophy	R2(NE)	Tommy Wright	13
2008–09	League 2	46	20	12	14	61	44	62 (Note: A period spent in administration resulted in a deduction of 10 League points, without which Darlington would have finished in the playoff positions.)	12th	R1	R2	Football League Trophy	SF(N)	Liam Hatch	9
2009–10	League 2 ↓	46	8	6	32	36	87	30	24th	R1	R1	Football League Trophy	R2(N)	Tadhg Purcell	9
2010–11	Conference	46	18	17	11	61	42	71	7th	R2	—	FA Trophy	W (Note: Defeated Mansfield Town to win the 2011 FA Trophy Final in their first appearance at the new Wembley Stadium. Chris Senior scored the only goal of the game in the last minute of extra time.)	Liam Hatch	11
2011–12	Conference ↓	46	11	13	22	47	73	36 (Note: A further period spent in administration resulted in a deduction of 10 League points and confirmed the club in the relegation positions.)	22nd	QR4	—	FA Trophy	R1	Ryan Bowman	10
2012–13	Northern 1 (Note: The first season under the name Darlington 1883, after failure to secure a Company Voluntary Arrangement before exiting administration caused the Football Association to regard it as a new club, requiring a change of name and placing it in the ninth tier of English football.) ↑	46	40	2	4	145	34	122	1st	—	—	—	—	Amar Purewal	24
2013–14	NPL 1N	42	28	6	8	101	37	90	2nd (Note: Lost the playoff semi-final to fifth-placed Ramsbottom United.)	—	—	FA Trophy	QR1	Stephen Thompson	24
2014–15	NPL 1N ↑	42	28	7	7	99	37	91	2nd (Note: Promoted via play-offs after beating third-placed Bamber Bridge 2–0 in the final.)	QR1	—	FA Trophy; NPL Challenge Cup	QR2; R1	Graeme Armstrong	22
2015–16	NPL ↑	46	33	5	8	106	42	104	1st	QR1	—	FA Trophy; NPL Challenge Cup	QR2; R3	Nathan Cartman	19
2016–17	National N	42	22	10	10	89	67	76	5th (Note: Finished in the play-off positions but denied participation because of ground grading issues.)	QR2	—	FA Trophy	QR3	Mark Beck	18
2017–18	National N (Note: First season playing again under the name Darlington F.C.)	42	14	13	15	58	58	55	12th	QR2	—	FA Trophy	QR3	Reece Styche; Stephen Thompson	11
2018–19	National N	42	12	14	16	56	62	50	16th	QR2	—	FA Trophy	QR3	Jordan Nicholson	11
2019–20	National N	33	14	6	13	43	50	48	10th (Note: The 2019–20 football season was disrupted by the effects of the COVID-19 pandemic. The National League was suspended in mid-March 2020 and the clubs voted six weeks later to end the regular season programme. Teams had not all played the same number of matches, so it was agreed to construct final league tables on an unweighted points per game basis. Darlington's 61.091 points per game placed them tenth.)	R1	—	FA Trophy	R2	Adam Campbell	15
2020–21	National N	11	4	1	6	17	11	13	19th (Note: After the 2020–21 season was disrupted by COVID-19 pandemic-related issues, including matches being played behind closed doors, testing requirements, and a perceived lack of adequate government support, the National League clubs voted on whether to continue their season. As a result, the National Leagues North and South were declared null and void in February 2021, at which point the northern clubs had played between 11 and 18 matches.)	R2	—	FA Trophy	QF	Adam Campbell; Érico Sousa	4
2021–22	National N	42	14	11	17	57	58	53	13th	QR2	—	FA Trophy	R2	Luke Charman	12
2022–23	National N	46	18	13	15	72	64	67	10th	QR3	—	FA Trophy	R4	Jacob Hazel	19
2023–24	National N	46	16	8	22	52	72	56	16th	QR3	—	FA Trophy	R2	Cameron Salkeld	9
2024–25	National N	46	18	15	13	61	54	69	11th	QR3	—	FA Trophy	R3	Cedric Main	11
