= George Elmore =

George Elmore may refer to:

- George Elmore (footballer), English footballer
- George Elmore (activist), American businessman and civil rights activist from South Carolina
