= Clarissa Allen =

American educator and author

Clarissa Minnie Thompson Allen
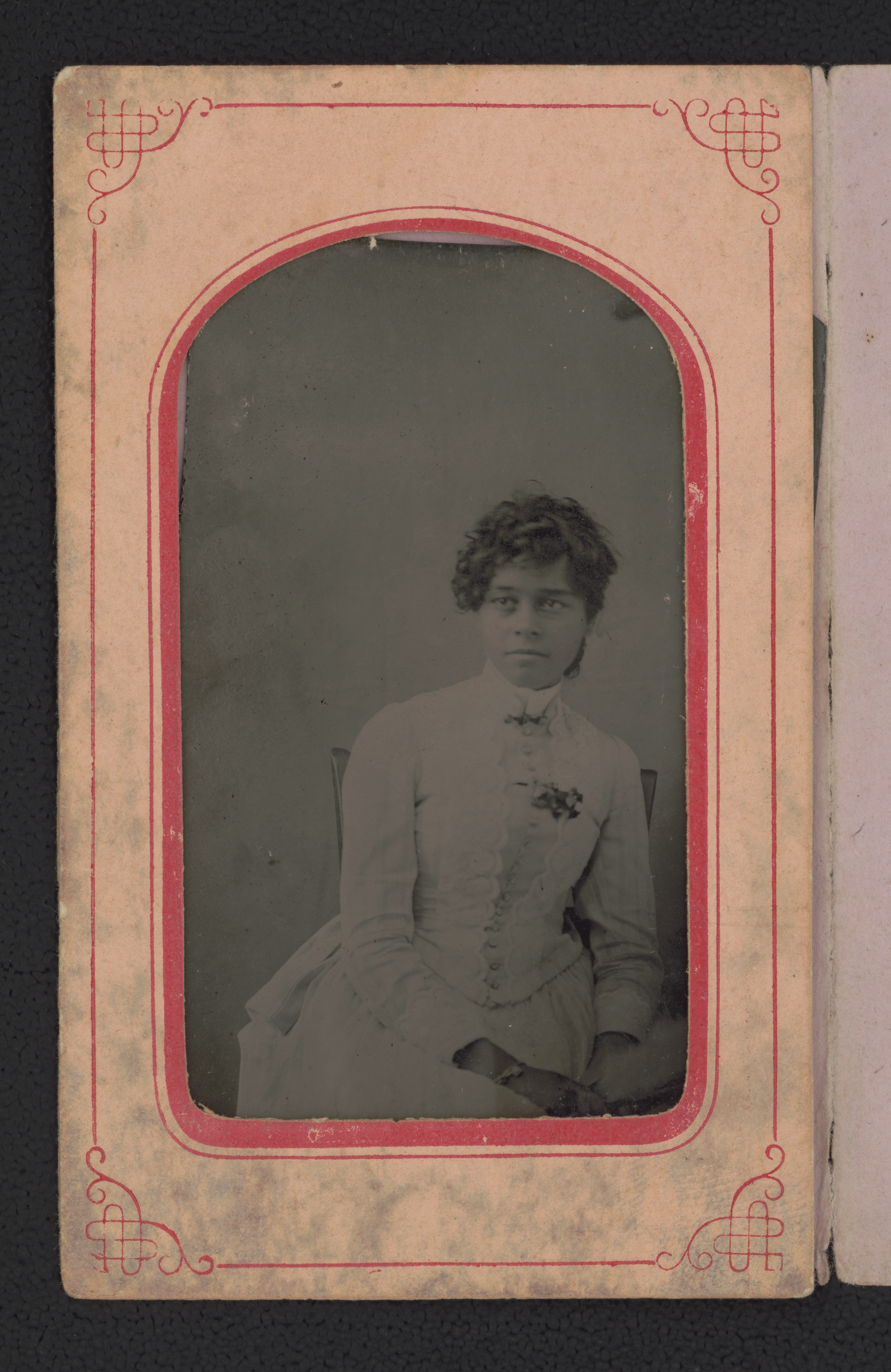
- Portrait of educator Clarissa M. Thompson, ca. 1872
- Born: Clarissa Minnie Thompson; October 1, 1859; Columbia, South Carolina, United States
- Died: November 23, 1941 (aged 82); Milam, Texas
- Education: Howard Junior High School
- Occupations: Educator author
- Writing career
- Language: English

Clarissa Minnie Thompson Allen (October 1, 1859 – November 23, 1941) was an American educator and author. She wrote fictional stories about wealthy African-American families in the American South.

== Personal life ==
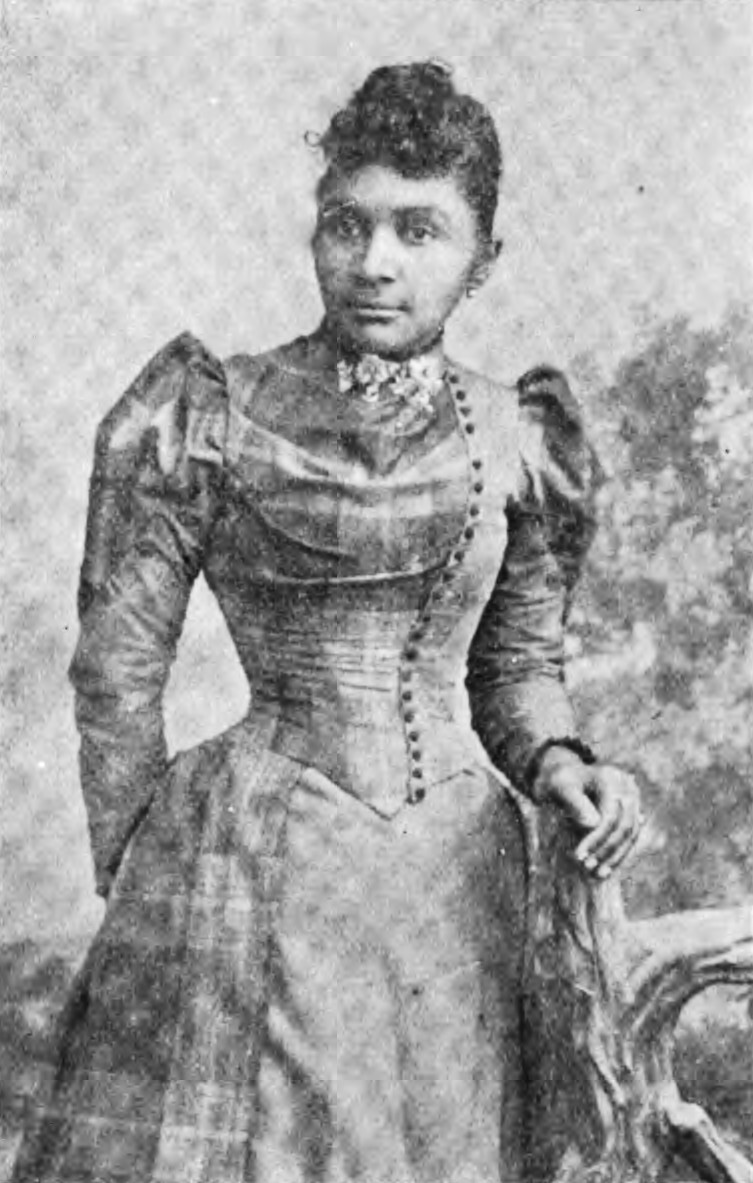
Clarissa Thompson, 1895

Clarissa Minnie Thompson was born in Columbia, South Carolina, one of nine children of Eliza Henrietta Montgomery, a socialite, and Samuel Benjamin Thompson, a delegate in the South Carolina Constitutional Convention. She attended Howard Junior High School and a normal school in South Carolina. She worked at three different schools, including Allen University, where she taught subjects like algebra, Latin, physical geology, and history. She moved to Jefferson, Texas, around 1886, where she taught at a public school. She also lived in Ft. Worth, Texas, and worked in the public school system.

== Career ==
Allen wrote fiction based around true stories about wealthy African-American families in the Southern United States. Her most notable work was Treading the Winepress, also called A Mountain of Misfortune. The book consisted of 41 stories about two families. The stories took place in "Capitolia," which was based on Columbia, South Carolina. The book includes love triangles and murder, as well as themes of womanhood, charity, and madness. It was a serialized publication and believed to be the first novel by an African-American woman from South Carolina. She also wrote novelettes for Texas-based publications. Her poetry was also published in African American newspapers. Some reviewers believed that her work was anti-religious, specifically towards the African Methodist Episcopal Church.
