= Dick Healey (footballer) =

English footballer (1889–1974)

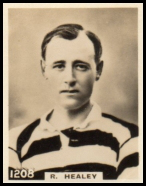
- Pictured in the 1920s

Personal information
- Full name: Richard Healey
- Date of birth: 20 September 1889
- Place of birth: Darlington, England
- Date of death: 1974 (aged 84–85)
- Place of death: Darlington, England
- Height: 5 ft 10 1/2 in (1.79 m)
- Positions: Inside right; centre forward

Youth career
- –: Darlington

Senior career*
Years	Team	Apps	(Gls)
190?–1910	Bishop Auckland		
1910–1914	Sunderland	3	(2)
1910	Stockton		
1910–1912	Bishop Auckland		
1912–1914	Darlington		
1914–1915	Middlesbrough	4	(2)
1915–1923	Darlington (Note: Appearances and goals for Football League matches only)	21	(5)

International career
1911–1912	England amateur	4	(4)
- * Club domestic league appearances and goals

Richard Healey (20 September 1889 – 1974) was an English footballer who played as an inside right or centre forward in the Football League for Sunderland, Middlesbrough and Darlington.

Healey began his football career as an amateur in his native Darlington. He helped Bishop Auckland win two Northern League titles and to reach the 1911 Amateur Cup Final, and also played non-league football for Stockton. He signed amateur forms with Football League club Sunderland in 1910, for whom he played three times and scored twice in the First Division. He won four caps for the England amateur team. Returning to Darlington F.C. in 1912, Healey was the club's top scorer as they won the 1912–13 North-Eastern League title, and was a member of the Amateur XI that opposed a team of professionals in the 1913 FA Charity Shield. In 1914, he turned professional with Middlesbrough, but played only four times, scoring twice. After the First World War, he returned to Darlington. He captained the team to the North-Eastern League title in 1921 and made 17 appearances in the Third Division North in the club's first two seasons in the Football League.

As a cricketer, he played a few matches for Durham in the Minor Counties Championship, and had a long association with Darlington Cricket Club, as player, captain and president.

== Personal life ==
Healey was born in Darlington, County Durham, the older child of Albert Healey and his wife Elizabeth née Jackson, daughter of a Stockton-on-Tees draper. The family was sufficiently well off to keep a live-in servant. Albert taught at the Bluecoat School in Stockton before moving to Darlington where he opened a hardware shop, and later worked for the National Telephone Company; he died in February 1899. Elizabeth remarried; at the time of the 1911 Census, Healey and his sister Winifred were assisting in their stepfather's business as licensee of the Three Tuns Hotel in Bishop Auckland.

Healey attended Darlington Grammar School, where he captained both the cricket and the football teams, and went on to Armstrong College, Newcastle, to train as a teacher. He taught for the rest of his working life, and retired in about 1950 from the post of headmaster of Rise Carr school. During the First World War, he served as a gunner with the 151st (Darlington) Heavy Battery, Royal Garrison Artillery.

He married Florence Bradley, the daughter of a local florist, in a Bishop Auckland Presbyterian church in 1914; a daughter, Winifred, was born the following year. Healey died in Darlington in late 1974.

== Club football ==
=== Early career and Sunderland ===
Healey began his football career with Darlington while still a schoolboy, and was playing for Bishop Auckland as they won the Northern League title in the 1908–09 season. His play attracted attention. In February 1910, he was selected for an amateur international trial, and in March, he appeared for Sunderland's North-Eastern League team, creating two goals and scoring the last in a 6–0 defeat of Darlington. He made his Football League debut in April, in a 2–0 defeat away to Manchester United in the First Division. The Sunderland Daily Echo commented that he and fellow inside forward George Holley "perhaps did not make the most of their opportunities, for when in possession in the shooting zone they failed to shoot with sufficient power." He kept his place for the last home match of the season, against Bradford City, "proved a keen worker", according to the Echo correspondent, and scored the first two goals in a 3–0 win. The first resulted from Bradford's goalkeeper Harry Maskrey losing the ball when attempting a clearance; he then "seized Healey, but the latter struggled free and jumping over Maskrey he put the ball in the net". The second was a header from a corner. He missed Sunderland's last match of the season to play for Bishop Auckland in a 2–1 win against Scarborough that secured them the Northern League title. Sunderland retained Healey's Football League registration for each season up to 1913–14, but he played only once more for the first team, at Aston Villa in October 1911.

=== Back to non-league football ===
For family reasons, Healey began the 1910–11 season with Stockton, but soon returned to Bishop Auckland, whom he helped reach the 1911 FA Amateur Cup final. He scored in the semi-final, against Ilford, but Bishops lost to Bromley in the final, despite their opponents having a man sent off for striking another player. He moved on to Darlington in February 1912, and the following season was their top scorer with 41 league goals as the club won the North-Eastern League title. Healey was included at inside right in a forward line "about as strong as it could be made" for the Amateur XI that faced a Professional XI in the 1913 FA Charity Shield. Although the amateurs lost 7–2, the Daily Mirror's reporter picked him out as the "most consistent forward in the line".

He was selected for the North-Eastern League eleven to face the Central League in February 1914. In March, Scottish club St Mirren were without the services of the injured George Elmore for their Scottish Cup quarter-final, and had hoped to use Healey in his place; he had previously played in the area with the Northern Nomads travelling team. Sunderland made no objection, but it was reported first that business prevented Healey obliging, and later that he had an injured knee.

=== Professional football with Middlesbrough ===
Four days later, he turned professional with First Division Middlesbrough. He was described as "[possessing] fine physique, and is a remarkably clever dribbler and good shot" – he had already reached the 20-goal mark for Darlington – and it was expected that "professional training will increase his pace". He made his first-team debut on 4 April at home to Preston North End, scored Middlesbrough's third goal 15 minutes into the second half as they won 4–1, and "proved himself well up to the first grade of Association Football". He was retained for the 1914–15 season – the last before league football was discontinued for the duration of the First World War – but played mainly for the reserve team in the North-Eastern League, in which capacity he was chosen for the Rest of the League team for the annual fixture against the league champions. He made three more Football League appearances, and scored one more goal, a second-half header against Bradford in November 1914 in what was Middlesbrough's first home defeat of the season.

=== Post-war football with Darlington ===
After Darlington F.C. folded during the war, a new club, Darlington Forge Albion, was formed to represent the town in the Northern Victory League. Healey resumed his football career with that club, which was renamed Darlington for the first post-war season of the North-Eastern League. His goals contributed to their second-place finish – he was the league's top scorer halfway through the season – and earned him selection for the representative match against the Central League.

His goals also helped Darlington reach the second round proper (last 32) of the 1919–20 FA Cup. Healey scored twice against Bishop Auckland in the fifth qualifying round, and repeated the feat in the sixth, as well as creating two for Aaron Travis, as Darlington beat Southern League club Norwich City 5–0. In the first round proper, Darlington faced Sheffield Wednesday of the First Division. A damaged shoulder meant Healey was unfit for the scheduled date, but a waterlogged Feethams pitch gave him an extra few days to recover. The match ended goalless; Healey was unusually indecisive in front of goal, and was standing in an offside position when Travis did put the ball in the net. Although reported doubtful for the replay, he did appear, pressuring goalkeeper Arnold Birch into conceding a corner from which Darlington took the lead – the goal variously attributed to George Stevens or to Healey himself. He missed the second-round tie at Birmingham because his wife was ill; Darlington lost 4–0.

Under Healey's captaincy, Darlington won the North-Eastern League title in 1920–21. In the FA Cup, they hosted Second Division club Blackpool in the first round. Healey scored the opener, was involved in Darlington's late equaliser, and missed another chance by heading wide when well placed; they lost the replay.

Darlington formed part of the new Northern Section of the Third Division in 1921–22. Healey was no longer a first choice in the forward line, but appeared not infrequently, particularly when the ground was heavy. He made his first appearance on 24 December and played in nine of the next twelve fixtures. Replacing the injured Arthur Wolstenholme for the FA Cup match against Manchester City, he opened the scoring with a header, but City won 3–1. He kept his place for the next match, and even after Wolstenholme's return to fitness continued in the team, with a winning goal against Rochdale, four of Darlington's six to beat Hartlepools United in the Durham Senior Cup, and profiting from a defensive error to score the only goal of the league visit to Tranmere Rovers. Healey was retained for the 1922–23 season, and he scored against Accrington Stanley in September, but he played mainly in the reserves. In a match against Hartlepools' reserves in November, he was the butt of the crowd's mockery because he had, as the Northern Daily Mail put it, "now lost some of his former vigour". He finished his Football League career with 5 goals from 21 matches.

== International football ==
Healey played at centre forward for The North in an amateur trial match in February 1910; his side lost 3–2, and he was not selected for the upcoming fixtures. His first international selection came in the form of a last-minute call-up when Frank Monk and Vivian Woodward dropped out of the England Amateur XI's visit to mainland Europe in March 1911. Healey made his debut against the France national team at the Stade de Paris, opening the scoring as his team won 3–0, and scored again a couple of days later against Switzerland in a 4–1 win. His next involvement at international level was nearly a year later, against the Wales Amateur XI at the ground of his former club, Bishop Auckland, in February 1912. He was involved in the buildup to the second goal, scored by Sydney Sanders, and scored the third himself as England won 3–0. He was selected as a reserve for matches at home to the Netherlands and away to Belgium in March and April, but did not make his next, and what turned out to be final, appearance until November against Belgium, in which he scored the second of England's four goals. He had to withdraw from the selection to face Wales in February 1913, and was an unused reserve for the visits to Germany and Belgium in March and to Wales the following February.

== Cricket career ==
Healey's first involvement with Darlington Cricket Club was as a nine-year-old. He made his debut for the second eleven in 1906, finished at the top of both batting and bowling averages the following season, and played for the first eleven in 1908. In 1910, he played in a Durham county trial match and for Durham Colts against a full county side. A sound performance with the bat in the corresponding fixture in 1911 earned him selection for Durham. He played in five Minor Counties matches that season, two in 1913, and his eighth and last in 1920. In 1913, Healey was appointed captain of Darlington CC, a position he held until the end of the 1930 season, when he resigned after leading the club to a seventh North Yorkshire and South Durham League title under his captaincy. In 25 seasons as a first-eleven player, he scored 6,586 runs at an average of 28.76, a total that included four centuries and forty half-centuries; he also took 66 wickets and "over 80" catches. In 1951, after he retired from teaching, Healey became president of the club, an office he retained until his death.
