= George Elmore (activist) =

American civil rights activist

George A. Elmore
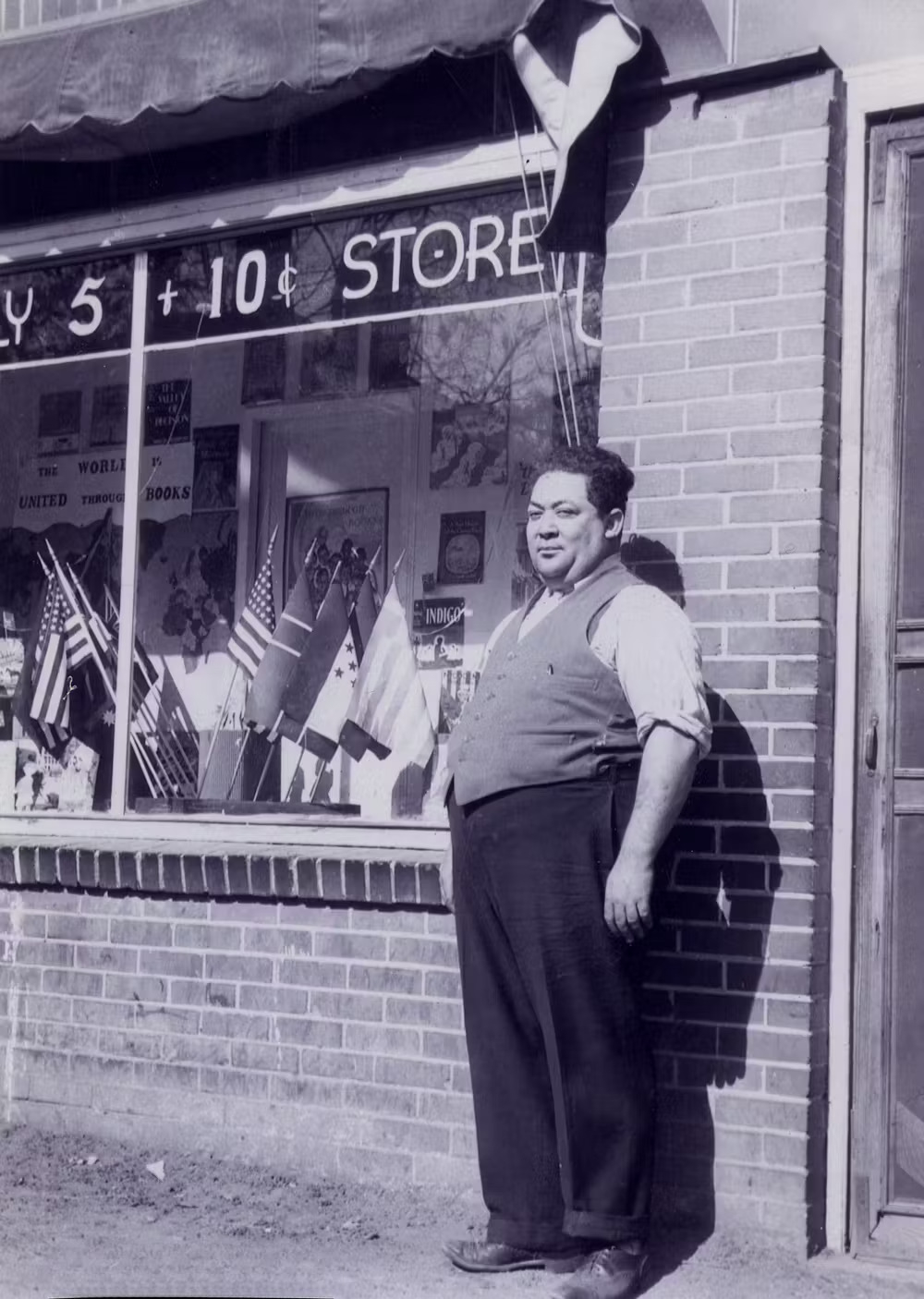
- George Elmore standing outside the Waverly Five & Dime c. 1945
- Born: March 31, 1905; Holly Hill, South Carolina, United States
- Died: February 25, 1959 (aged 53); Columbia, South Carolina, United States
- Resting place: Randolph Cemetery; 34°0′33.1″N 81°3′11.7″W
- Occupations: entrepreneur; local political leader; civil rights activist
- Known for: Plaintiff in Elmore v. Rice, a landmark voting rights case

George Augustus Elmore (March 31, 1905 – February 25, 1959) was an American businessman and civil rights activist from South Carolina who successfully sued the South Carolina Democratic Party in Elmore v. Rice, 72 F. Supp. 516 (1947), which eliminated the last white primary in the United States.

== Early life and entrepreneurial activities ==
Elmore was born on March 31, 1905 in the town of Holly Hill, South Carolina to Sadie Johnson, a single, unmarried, mulatta mother aged nineteen or twenty; his biological father, whom Elmore never met, has been suggested to be a Jewish man according to family legend, as Elmore's skin color "was a few shades lighter than that of his brothers and sisters." A few years after Elmore's birth, Sadie married a black farmer named George W. Elmore, a former slave who was twice her age; the young George promptly adopted his stepfather's surname. Elmore had an older brother, Ben, and three younger siblings, Willie, Ines, and Esther.

Elmore received a public school education through the eighth grade in Harleyville. In the early 1920s, Elmore moved to the capital of South Carolina, Columbia, for better job opportunities. In 1927, the 22-year-old Elmore married the 17-year-old Laura Belle Delaney (b. 1910), whose family lived in a ramshackle shotgun house. The couple's first home was at 1212 Lyon Street, which they rented for $8 a month. Besides managing the Waverly Five & Dime, a discount variety store, from 1945 to 1948, Elmore also operated two liquor stores, and had worked as a taxi driver and photographer on the side. In July 2012, the storefront that formerly hosted the Five & Dime at 2313 Gervais Street was demolished by the First Nazareth Baptist Church (who owned the lot) less than one week after a historical marker was unveiled celebrating Elmore's achievements.

George and Laura Elmore had four children together: Essie Naomi, born March 12, 1932; Cresswell Delaney, born November 8, 1938; Vernadine Veranus (named in reference to the Double V campaign), born August 2, 1942; and Yolande Anita, born September 11, 1949. From 1943 to 1954, Elmore and his middle class family lived in a small house at 907 Tree Street, where he would transform the bathroom into a makeshift darkroom.

=== Activism ===
Elmore was known in the local political scene as the secretary of the Progressive Democratic Party (PDP), a black political party in South Carolina founded in 1944 that challenged the state Democratic Party's opposition to black suffrage and desegregation. As an ordinary citizen activist he worked to challenge the white-only Democratic primaries. He played a key role in getting the Democratic Party to open its primaries to Black voters. He worked to move civil right ideas it practical actions. In mid-1945, Elmore volunteered to perform in a charity burlesque show entitled Puffin' Hot at the Booker T. Washington Auditorium, which was intended to raise funds for the construction of the Good Samaritan-Waverly Hospital. Elmore intended to perform as the singer Kate Smith, best known for her rendition of "God Bless America". Puffin' Hot was initially postponed, and no known newspaper accounts provide any detail about if and when the show took place. In February 1947, while serving as a freelance photographer for the Lighthouse and Informer, Elmore photographed the mangled corpse of Willie Earle, who had recently been lynched in Greenville for the alleged murder of a white taxi driver.

Elmore was highly respected within the Waverly community, with his store being a popular destination for school children eager to buy ice cream cones and other treats after school. In a 2022 interview, Melvin S. Hodges, a childhood friend of Cresswell Elmore, recalled, "Everyone knew Mr. Elmore. He was a friendly guy; everybody liked him except the white power structure." For many of the local black children, Elmore served as an industrious role model.

== Challenging discrimination in the primary ==
As a result of the Supreme Court's landmark decision in Smith v. Allwright (1944), which ruled that the disenfranchisement of black voters in primaries was unconstitutional, South Carolina's state legislature redesignated the state's Democratic Party as a "private club" in an attempt to circumvent primary-related laws. Then-governor Olin D. Johnston proclaimed, "White supremacy must be maintained in our primaries. Let the chips fall where they may!" The Democratic primaries essentially determined the outcome of general elections, as the Republican Party's power was near-nonexistent since the collapse of Reconstruction in 1877.

In spring 1946, the Reverend James Myles Hinton, head of Columbia's NAACP branch, handpicked "guinea pigs" who would attempt to register to vote in certain wards. Elmore, however, was not chosen. Hinton, along with three other civil rights activists, Dr. R. W. Mance, Rev. E. A. Davis, and Rev F. M. Young, were all rejected as they tried to enroll in Richland County's ninth ward. As the four men stood outside dejected, Elmore showed up unannounced and decided to try his luck. The middle-aged, white, female clerk, believing him to be white, helped the "fair-skinned, straight-haired" Elmore fill out the necessary paperwork for a voting certificate. Elmore initially left his home address blank, and upon telling the clerk that he lived on Tree Street, she promptly exclaimed, "Why you're a nigger!" Nevertheless, the clerk registered the highly-obsequious Elmore to vote in the upcoming general election, and even permitted Hinton's group to enroll.

When Elmore visited his polling place on the primary's election date, August 13, 1946, he was denied the ability to vote on the basis of his race and redirected to John I. Rice, the chairman of the Richland County Democratic Executive Committee, who affirmed that "the [Democratic Party] was for white people only." On February 21, 1947, the NAACP filed a lawsuit on Elmore's behalf in the United States District Court for the Eastern District of South Carolina, a federal court.

=== Elmore v. Rice (1947) ===
"The rules say that Elmore must be a white Democrat before he can vote in the primary. Elmore is not a white Democrat. He is a Negro. How can he ever become a Democrat? That's the crux of the whole case. I don't see a bit of difference in him standing up at the polls in the general election and in the primary. Grant Elmore the right to cast his ballot in the only place it will count!"

— Thurgood Marshall, arguing on behalf of Elmore

Elmore's legal team was led by future Supreme Court Justice Thurgood Marshall (who himself had argued in Smith v. Allwright), Robert L. Carter, and Harold R. Boulware. The case was opened before judge Julius Waties Waring on June 3, 1947. The trial, which lasted three days, saw the courtroom overflowing with predominantly black onlookers. Among the audience was the 25-year-old Matthew J. Perry, who reflected that "Marshall and Carter were hitting it where it should be hit."

Christie Benet, who had briefly served as a Senator following the death of "Pitchfork Ben" Tillman in 1918, was the leading attorney of the defense. Benet sought to red-bait the plaintiff by contending that "Elmore does not show whether he is a Democrat, Republican, Populist, Communist—or what not." The defense team also included state senators William P. Baskins, Yancy MacLeod, and Edgar Brown, in addition to the lawyers Charles B. Elliott and Irvine F. Belser.

On July 12, Waring, described by historian Bobby Donaldson as a "Charleston blueblood," ruled in favor of Elmore, thus dismantling South Carolina's white primary. In his judicial decision, Waring issued the statement, "It is time for South Carolina to rejoin the Union. It is time to fall in step with the other states and to adopt the American way of conducting elections." Judge Waring's ruling was upheld by the United States Court of Appeals for the Fourth Circuit; the Supreme Court refused to hear the case any further. However, as researcher Gerrit Sterk notes, "the elements of reading, writing, and interpreting the Constitution were still in effect, as well as the poll tax, which was not repealed until 1952. So, while there was a victory in the ability to vote, the assurance of actually being able to vote without conditions was not."

John Henry McCray, a black journalist and chairman of the Progressive Democrats, celebrated his colleague Elmore's victory, stating, "The question of subterfuges and denials based on class and race is now forever settled as far as voting by classes is concerned." Governor Strom Thurmond, who would form the breakaway, segregationist Dixiecrat Party in July 1948, was furious at this turn of events, proclaiming, "I predict that Americans everywhere will live to regret the principle of law which has been laid down...the result is unsound and un-American...[and] we in South Carolina will be faced with many serious practical problems in the days ahead."

"Such a flagrant disregard of basic rights must have sprung from either gross ignorance or a conscious determination to evade the issue and to refuse to obey the law of the land. It is hardly credible that a convention composed of a large number of persons, many of whom have had long years of experience and were experts in political matters...should have been so crassly ignorant."

— Julius Waties Waring, July 20, 1948

When the South Carolina Democratic Party attempted to defy the Elmore v. Rice ruling by requiring all members to affirm a loyalty oath endorsing racial segregation, Waring issued an injunction in July 1948. By the time of the August 10, 1948 Democratic primaries, more than 30,000 black South Carolinians, including Elmore and his wife Laura, voted.

== Hardships after legal victory ==
Elmore, who received no financial settlement from his victory, quickly became a target of white animosity. Elmore and his family suffered intimidation from the Ku Klux Klan, who burned crosses in their yard. In addition, photographs depicting lynchings would be anonymously mailed to Elmore's property. The terror was so traumatic that Laura suffered a nervous breakdown and had to be institutionalized at a segregated mental hospital just a few months after Naomi, Elmore's eldest child, graduated from Benedict College. For the rest of Elmore's life, he would visit his wife at the "dirty and overcrowded" asylum, bringing her "silver bells."

Elmore also faced severe economic retaliation from white vendors, who would refuse to supply him with bread, crackers, sodas, and other essential inventory items for his Five & Dime store, thus leading to his financial ruin. Simon Bouie, then a young boy living in the Waverly community, recalled of Elmore, "I remember seeing a very sad man. He would come out every day and he would just stand in front of the store. He was waiting for people to come, apparently. But really a lot of people just stopped going to the store when it got kind of rough." According to his son Cresswell, at one point "state agents raided Elmore's liquor store, claiming the liquor he had bought from the standard wholesaler was illegal, and broke the bottles." By 1949, Elmore had closed his Five & Dime store. Though Elmore tried to make a living with his photography business, it did not earn enough to sustain his family.

Faced with dwindling income and spiralling mortgage obligations, the family frequently moved around from home to home after their property on 907 Tree Street was foreclosed on November 2, 1953. The foreclosure stirred controversy within Columbia's black community since Elmore's mortgage had been with Victory Savings Bank, Columbia's first black-owned bank, which was then led by Dr. Henry Monteith, the brother of prominent local NAACP activist Modjeska Monteith Simkins. At auction, Elmore's property was purchased by Rachel E. Monteith, the mother of Henry and Modjeska, for $3,054. Simkins had recently become estranged from Elmore's close friend, John Henry McCray, and McCray believed that the Monteith family was acting out of spite, writing in a letter to Elmore, "Dr. Monteith gave...the 'double-cross' in selling the house without first advising us it was going to be sold and allowing the small group working the chance to equal the bid." Elmore, with his children, travelled to Washington, D.C. for approximately nine months in search of work, but returned to Columbia after coming up empty-handed. The family then lived with the family of Laura Elmore's niece, Lillian Delaney Edney, in Saxon Homes, a newly constructed public housing project. Edney's home was not large enough to accommodate the entire Elmore family, so George and Cresswell would sleep outside in their Chevrolet truck.

== Death ==
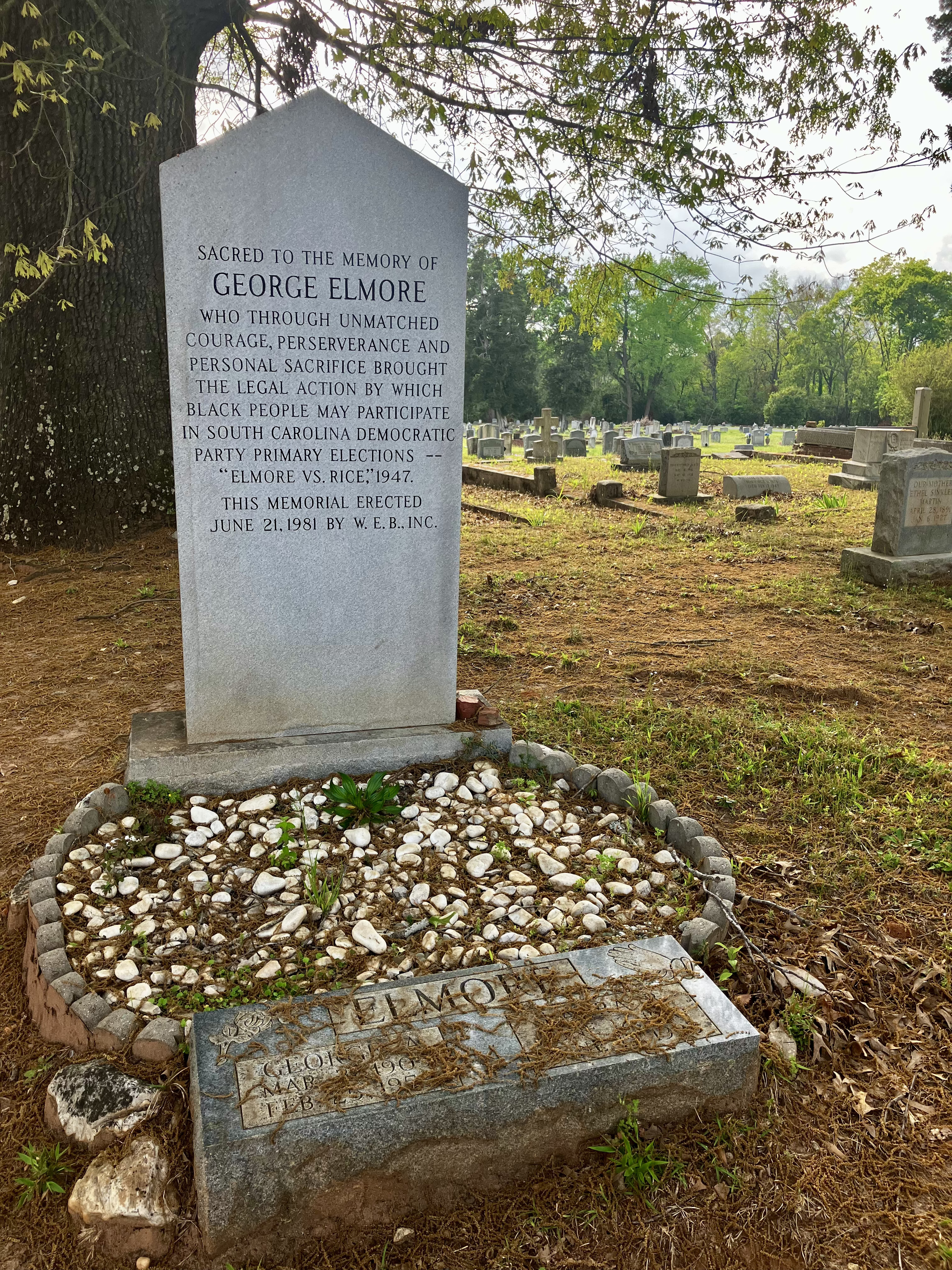
George Elmore's grave and monument in Randolph Cemetery

On February 25, 1959, at the age of 53, George Elmore died "a broken man" in near-total obscurity. His wife Laura died on June 19, 1993. In a 2003 interview given to The State, then-85-year-old retired teacher Fannie Phelps Adams commented, "Every time I think of integration, I think of George Elmore...He was treated as bad as possibly could be, so much so that he died a pauper."

Elmore was buried at Randolph Cemetery. On June 21, 1981, a monument was unveiled at Elmore's grave; the ceremony was attended by many prominent local civil rights activists, including Ernest A. Finney Jr., Matthew J. Perry, and his former attorney, Harold Boulware. The inscription on the monument reads: "Sacred to the memory of George Elmore, who through unmatched courage, perseverance (Note: The actual inscription bears the misspelling of "perserverence) and personal sacrifice, brought the legal action by which black people may participate in South Carolina Democratic Party primary elections -'Elmore vs. Rice,' 1947."

== See also ==
- Nixon v. Herndon
- Nixon v. Condon
- Grovey v. Townsend
- Modjeska Monteith Simkins

== Bibliography ==
- Click, Carolyn (2025). The Cost of the Vote: George Elmore and the Battle for the Ballot. Columbia, South Carolina: University of South Carolina Press. ISBN 9781643365138.
