= Samuel Benjamin Thompson =

American politician

Samuel Benjamin Thompson (October 11, 1837 - August 1909) was a lawyer, judicial official, and Reconstruction Era politician in South Carolina.

He was a delegate to the 1865 South Carolina Constitutional Constitutional Convention. He was also an elected member of the 48th general assembly from 1868 to 1870, one of the four representatives for Richland County. He served as a state legislator for six years as well as a justice of the peace for eight years.

He was the uncle of Charleston doctor Alonzo Clifton McClennan. He married Eliza Henrietta Montgomery and had nine children. Their eldest child, Clarissa Minnie Thompson Allen, became an educator and author.

He and eight other reconstruction era legislators are buried at Randolph Cemetery.
