= William Beverly Nash =

American politician

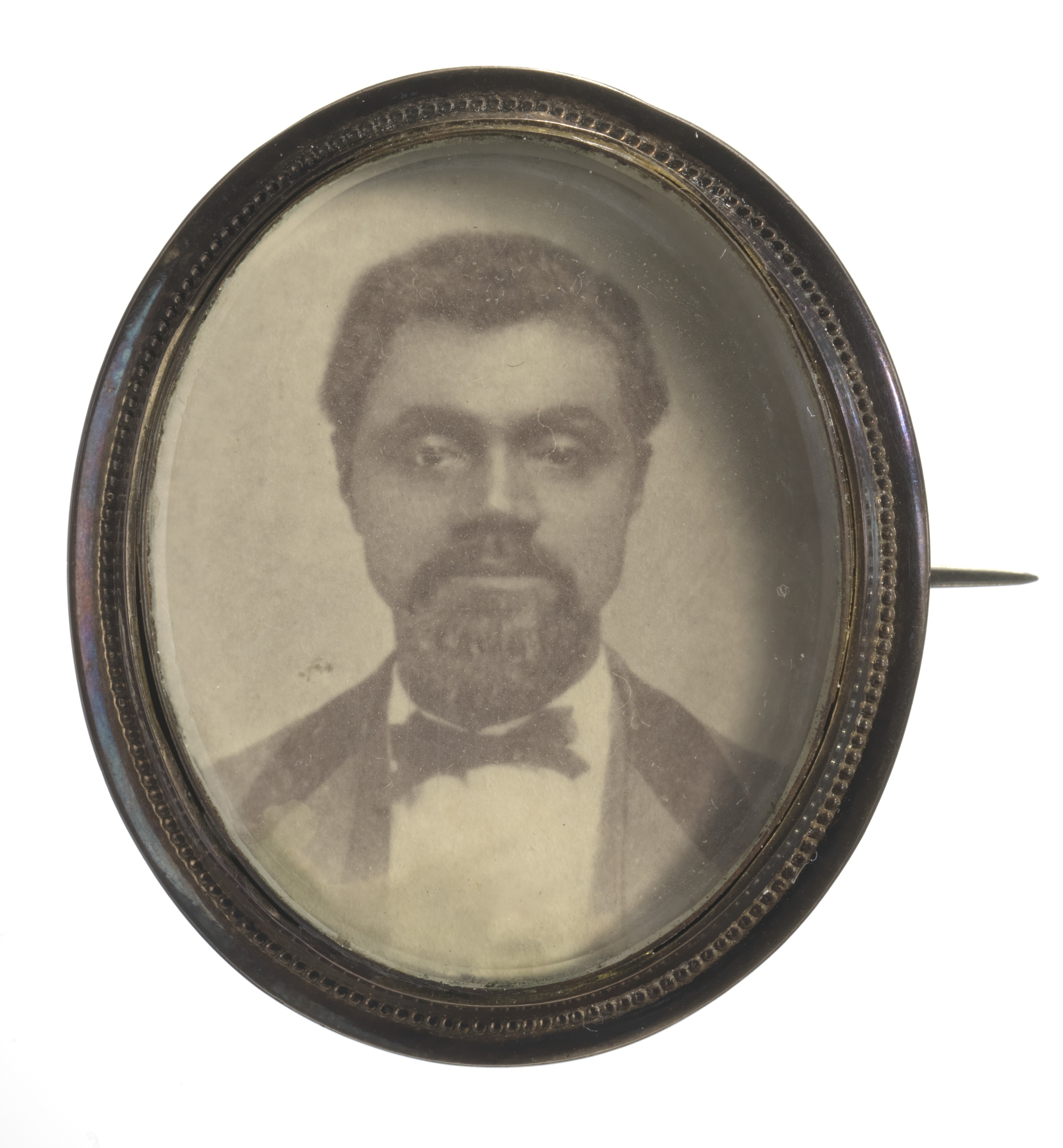
A photograph pin back button featuring an image of Sen. W.B. Nash.

William Beverly Nash (c. 1822 – January 19, 1888) was a barber, shoe shine, porter, waiter, and state senator in South Carolina. An African American, Nash was born enslaved in Virginia, Nash gained his freedom at the age of 43 with the passage of the 13th Amendment. After the American Civil War, he became a state legislator during the Reconstruction Era. He was instrumental in drafting South Carolina's Constitution of 1868, and held several committee positions in the state government over his career. He held his office for 21 years before resigning.

== Early life ==
Very little is known of Nash's early life. He was born in Virginia to enslaved parents, whose names are unknown. At thirteen, local politician and slaver William C. Preston brought Nash to Columbia, South Carolina. In Columbia, Preston had Nash serve an apprenticeship to a barber and later worked at Hunt's Hotel as a shoeshiner, bellhop, and waiter. During this time, Nash secretly taught himself to read and write, while gaining exposure to local politics through Preston and the hotel's clientele.

== Political career ==
Nash helped to organize the Union League in Columbia, South Carolina, which was an important and influential Black political organization. In 1864, Nash began a successful career as a politician and businessman. During Reconstruction, Nash became active in the Republican Party. On November 20, 1865, he represented Columbia in South Carolina's Colored Peoples Convention at Zion Church in Charleston, which convened to oppose the Black Codes. In 1866, he gained notoriety for criticizing the Freedmen's Bureau's alleged favoritism towards coastal regions of South Carolina, and was named a magistrate for Columbia in 1867. Nash campaigned for universal male suffrage as a delegate to the National Freedmen's Convention in Washington, D.C., and was elected to the state senate in 1868. Though Nash opposed the confiscation of former Confederate lands, he was a proponent of land redistribution throughout his political career. To achieve this, Nash proposed higher taxes on large plantations, to force landowners to sell parcels of property to Blacks and poor Whites.

As a senator, Nash was part of a wave of Radical Republicans that gained influence in the U.S. Congress and in state governments across the nation. This U.S. Congress required former Confederate states to adopt new constitutions and ratify the 14th Amendment. South Carolina held a constitutional convention to adopt a new framework of government, and for the first time Black men participated in the election of delegates to this convention. Nash, along with other Black Radical Republicans at the convention, helped write a new constitution. This constitution guaranteed free public education for all children, expanded women's rights, overturned the state's Black Codes, abolished debtors' prison, and abolished race as a condition for suffrage.

Beverly Nash and other prominent Black legislators in South Carolina, including Robert DeLarge and Robert Smalls made efforts to reform the state government and continued to work for increased social investment. In 1871 Nash, DeLarge, Smalls, and others attempted to form a new political party. Shortly after, a joint Committee in the state legislature was tasked with examining debt and bribery within the government. The increasing state debt was the subject of political arguments against financial legislation of Reconstruction. Nash held positions in numerous senate budget committees, and drew criticism for his handling of state funds.

In 1887 White Southerners ended the Reconstruction Era by forcibly removing Southern Black politicians from public offices. White Southerners regained control of South Carolina's government and disenfranchised the Black labor vote. Early in 1887, after White Democrats threatened to expose him for alleged corruption and bribery, Nash resigned from his seat.

Though he never held public office again, after his political career was ended, Nash continued to work in real estate. He died in his home due to heart issues at the age of 66.He is buried at Randolph Cemetery with eight other reconstruction era legislators.

The Smithsonian has a pinback button featuring his visage. Nash also appears in a composite image composed of albumen silver print photographs of 63 South Carolina Radical Republican legislators. The image is subtitled radical members of the South Carolina Legislature. Benjamin R. Tillman later used the composite image as propaganda to disenfranchise African Americans.

== See also ==
- African American officeholders from the end of the Civil War until before 1900
