= William Fabriel Myers =

American politician

South Carolina State Senate
- In office 1874–1878

Personal details
- Born: 1850 South Carolina
- Died: January 13, 1917 (aged 66)
- Resting place: Randolph Cemetery
- Party: Republican

William Fabriel Myers (August 1850 – January 13, 1917) was an African-American lawyer and state senator in South Carolina. An African American, he was involved in politics during the Reconstruction Era. He served as a state senator from 1874 until 1878.

== Biography ==
Myers was born 1850 in Charleston, South Carolina and was educated during the Reconstruction era at the University of South Carolina before being admitted to the bar in 1875.

He was appointed as an auditor for Colleton County, South Carolina in 1873 but was removed the following year by Governor Franklin J. Moses for political reasons.

He served as an elector in November 1876.

Myers was elected to serve in the South Carolina State Senate in 1874 and served until 1878.

He was also a major in the state militia from 1873 until 1877.

He served in 1910 as the deputy collector for the United States Customs in Columbia, South Carolina.

He died January 13, 1917 Columbia, South Carolina, and is buried in Randolph Cemetery with eight other reconstruction era legislators.

== See also ==
- African American officeholders from the end of the Civil War until before 1900
