= Charles McDuffie Wilder =

American politician

Charles McDuffie Wilder (c.1835–1902) was an American public official and politician in South Carolina. He was appointed postmaster by U.S. President Ulysses S. Grant and was a city councilor in Columbia, South Carolina. He established himself as a carpenter. He served as a member of the South Carolina General Assembly.

== Life ==
Wilder was born circa 1835 in Sumter, South Carolina.

He represented Richland County in the General Assembly. He also served as postmaster and was a Columbia City Council member. He held the postmaster position for 16 years.

He is buried at the Randolph Cemetery.
