= William Simons (politician) =

South Carolina politician

Member of the South Carolina House of Representatives from the Richland County district

Personal details
- Born: 1810
- Died: 1878 (aged 67–68) Randolph Cemetery
- Spouse: Eliza
- Children: Catherine; Emma; Rosena

William Simons (1810 - 1878) was a Reconstruction era politician in South Carolina. He was a member of the 48th and 49th South Carolina General Assembly from 1868 until 1872 and was one of the four representatives for Richland County. He was a Republican.

He is buried at Randolph Cemetery with eight other reconstruction era legislators.

His name is sometimes listed as William H. Simons and was possibly William M. Simons but in his time of legislative service listed as William Simons.

He had a wife Eliza and three children Catherine, Emma, and Rosena.

== See also ==
- African American officeholders from the end of the Civil War until before 1900
