= 1913 FA Charity Shield =

- Event: FA Charity Shield
Professionals	Amateurs
7	2
- Date: 6 October 1913
- Venue: The Den, New Cross, London
- Attendance: "quite 15,000"
- Weather: Fine

The 1913 FA Charity Shield was the sixth staging of the FA Charity Shield, an annual association football match arranged to raise funds for charitable causes supported by the Football Association (the FA), the governing body of football in England. The match was contested by select teams of amateur and professional players. It was played on 6 October 1913 at The Den, London, and ended as a 7–2 win for the Professionals. England internationals Harry Hampton scored four goals, George Holley two and Harold Fleming one for the Professionals; George Barlow and Herbert Farnfield scored for the Amateurs. The proceeds were donated to the Senghenydd Colliery Disaster Fund.

== Pre-match ==
For the first time, the Football Association decided that the Shield should be contested not by the respective champions of the Football League and Southern League, but by teams of amateur and professional players to be selected by the FA's International Selection Committee. The professional team was the same eleven that represented England in their last Home International match, against Scotland in April, and the amateur selection contained several gold medallists from the 1912 Stockholm Olympics. Bob Crompton of Blackburn Rovers was to captain the Professionals, and Chelsea's Vivian Woodward led the Amateurs. The Daily Mirror thought it "a sensible idea to give Scotland's conquerors another run together", and for the amateur XI, "the forward line is about as strong as it could be made; but a lot will depend on the defence." The match was to be played in the afternoon of Monday 5 October 1913 at The Den, the New Cross (south London) ground of Millwall F.C. G.H. Muir of Hampshire was to referee the match, assisted by J.W.L. Windridge (Hertfordshire) and W. Burgess (Surrey County Football Association), and Lord Kinnaird, president of the Football Association, was invited to present the medals.

There were a number of changes from the teams originally selected. Bromley's Ernest Peacock replaced Oxford City's Kenneth Hunt at centre half for the Amateurs, and the right flank of the Professionals lineup had to be reorganised. Fanny Walden came in on the wing in place of the injured Jock Simpson of Blackburn, and Tom Brittleton's "indisposition" gave a chance at right half to Sunderland's Frank Cuggy, who, according to the Daily Express, "has not so far reproduced in representative games the form he shows in inter-club football." An injury to Jesse Pennington, West Bromwich Albion's left back, meant a late call-up for Birmingham's Frank Womack.

== Match summary ==
Woodward came close to a goal five minutes into the game, and his side were on top for the first fifteen minutes, but in the next ten, the Professionals took a three-goal lead. First George Holley beat both amateur wing halves to open the scoring, the second came from Harold Fleming's "splendid left-foot shot", and Harry Hampton converted a corner. The half finished 4–0, after Hampton converted a penalty awarded against Arthur Knight for handball when Fleming's powerful shot struck his arm.

Hampton completed his hat-trick after five minutes of the second half, but then the Amateurs took control. Sam Hardy kept out shots from Dick Healey, Ivan Sharpe and Herbert Farnfield before being beaten twice in five minutes. After a "great shot" from Preston North End winger George Barlow, the Amateurs' second was touched in by Farnfield after a move involving four players brought the ball all the way down the field. It was, according to the pseudonymous 'Reflector', writing in the Mirror, "easily the best of the match." Confusion between goalkeeper Ronald Brebner and full-back Thomas Burn presented Hampton with his fourth, and Holley completed the scoring late on.

The Mirror highlighted the performance of Walden, who was involved in three of the Professionals' goals and who outplayed the defence on his side of the field, centre-half Joe McCall, and replacement left-back Womack; Peacock at centre half, Dick Healey at inside right, and centre-forward Woodward were the pick of the Amateurs. The Manchester Guardian thought the Professional team "an evenly-balanced side, strong in every particular" who "played a fast game without a suggestion of foul methods". Its reporter agreed that the Amateur wing halves were weak, which combined with the absence of Hunt put undue pressure on backs and goalkeeper, although the conclusion that it was "rather remarkable that the scoring did not reach double figures", was in clear contrast to the Mirror's opinion that the five-goal difference flattered the winners.

Lord Kinnaird was away in Scotland, so the FA chairman, J. C. Clegg, presented the shield and medals.

=== Match details ===
6 October 1913
15:30

Professionals	7–2	Amateurs
Hampton 4 Holley 2 Fleming		Barlow; Farnfield

The Den, New Cross, London
Attendance: "quite 15,000"
Referee: G.H. Muir (Hampshire)

Professionals			Amateurs
Goalkeeper	Sam Hardy	Aston Villa	Goalkeeper	Ronald Brebner	Leicester Fosse
Full back	Bob Crompton (capt)	Blackburn Rovers	Full back	Thomas Burn	London Caledonians
Full back	Frank Womack	Birmingham	Full back	Arthur Knight	Portsmouth
Wing half	Frank Cuggy	Sunderland	Wing half	G.H. How	London Caledonians
Centre half	Joe McCall	Preston North End	Centre half	Ernest Peacock	Bromley
Wing half	Billy Watson	Burnley	Wing half	Joe Dines	Ilford
Forward	Fanny Walden	Tottenham Hotspur	Forward	Ivan Sharpe	Leeds City
Forward	Harold Fleming	Swindon Town	Forward	Dick Healey	Darlington
Forward	Harry Hampton	Aston Villa	Forward	Vivian Woodward (capt)	Chelsea
Forward	George Holley	Sunderland	Forward	Herbert Farnfield	New Crusaders
Forward	Joe Hodkinson	Blackburn Rovers	Forward	George Barlow	Preston North End

== Post-match ==
The Mirror estimated the attendance at "quite 15,000 people", and receipts totalled £391. The Millwall club made no claim for expenses involved in staging the match, and the entire proceeds were donated to the fund set up to support those affected by the Senghenydd Colliery Disaster, an explosion in a South Wales coal mine in which 440 people were killed, which had happened eight days after the Charity Shield match.

The Amateurs contributed the majority of those selected for the England amateur XI's next international matches, against Ireland and Netherlands.
