= 1913–14 in English football =

Football in England
- Season: 1913–14

Men's football
- Football League: Blackburn Rovers
- Football League Second Division: Notts County
- FA Cup: Burnley

The 1913–14 season was the 43rd season of competitive football in England.

== Events ==
Burnley beat Liverpool 1-0 in the FA Cup final, and Blackburn Rovers were the champions.

== Honours ==
| Competition | Winner |
|---|---|
| First Division | Blackburn Rovers (2) |
| Second Division | Notts County |
| FA Cup | Burnley (1) |
| Charity Shield | Professionals XI |
| Home Championship | Ireland |

Notes = Number in parentheses is the times that club has won that honour. * indicates new record for competition

== League tables ==
=== First Division ===
| Pos | Team | Pld | W | D | L | GF | GA | GAv | Pts | Relegation |
|---|---|---|---|---|---|---|---|---|---|---|
| 1 | Blackburn Rovers (C) | 38 | 20 | 11 | 7 | 78 | 42 | 1.857 | 51 | |
| 2 | Aston Villa | 38 | 19 | 6 | 13 | 65 | 50 | 1.300 | 44 | |
| 3 | Middlesbrough | 38 | 19 | 5 | 14 | 77 | 60 | 1.283 | 43 | |
| 4 | Oldham Athletic | 38 | 17 | 9 | 12 | 55 | 45 | 1.222 | 43 | |
| 5 | West Bromwich Albion | 38 | 15 | 13 | 10 | 46 | 42 | 1.095 | 43 | |
| 6 | Bolton Wanderers | 38 | 16 | 10 | 12 | 65 | 52 | 1.250 | 42 | |
| 7 | Sunderland | 38 | 17 | 6 | 15 | 63 | 52 | 1.212 | 40 | |
| 8 | Chelsea | 38 | 16 | 7 | 15 | 46 | 55 | 0.836 | 39 | |
| 9 | Bradford City | 38 | 12 | 14 | 12 | 40 | 40 | 1.000 | 38 | |
| 10 | Sheffield United | 38 | 16 | 5 | 17 | 63 | 60 | 1.050 | 37 | |
| 11 | Newcastle United | 38 | 13 | 11 | 14 | 39 | 48 | 0.813 | 37 | |
| 12 | Burnley | 38 | 12 | 12 | 14 | 61 | 53 | 1.151 | 36 | |
| 13 | Manchester City | 38 | 14 | 8 | 16 | 51 | 53 | 0.962 | 36 | |
| 14 | Manchester United | 38 | 15 | 6 | 17 | 52 | 62 | 0.839 | 36 | |
| 15 | Everton | 38 | 12 | 11 | 15 | 46 | 55 | 0.836 | 35 | |
| 16 | Liverpool | 38 | 14 | 7 | 17 | 46 | 62 | 0.742 | 35 | |
| 17 | Tottenham Hotspur | 38 | 12 | 10 | 16 | 50 | 62 | 0.806 | 34 | |
| 18 | The Wednesday | 38 | 13 | 8 | 17 | 53 | 70 | 0.757 | 34 | |
| 19 | Preston North End (R) | 38 | 12 | 6 | 20 | 52 | 69 | 0.754 | 30 | Relegation to the Second Division |
| 20 | Derby County (R) | 38 | 8 | 11 | 19 | 55 | 71 | 0.775 | 27 | Relegation to the Second Division |

Source: World Football
Rules for classification: 1) Points; 2) Goal average; 3) Goals scored
(C) Champions; (R) Relegated

=== Second Division ===
| Pos | Team | Pld | W | D | L | GF | GA | GAv | Pts | Promotion or relegation |
|---|---|---|---|---|---|---|---|---|---|---|
| 1 | Notts County (C, P) | 38 | 23 | 7 | 8 | 77 | 36 | 2.139 | 53 | Promotion to the First Division |
| 2 | Bradford (Park Avenue) (P) | 38 | 23 | 3 | 12 | 71 | 47 | 1.511 | 49 | Promotion to the First Division |
| 3 | Woolwich Arsenal | 38 | 20 | 9 | 9 | 54 | 38 | 1.421 | 49 | |
| 4 | Leeds City | 38 | 20 | 7 | 11 | 76 | 46 | 1.652 | 47 | |
| 5 | Barnsley | 38 | 19 | 7 | 12 | 51 | 45 | 1.133 | 45 | |
| 6 | Clapton Orient | 38 | 16 | 11 | 11 | 47 | 35 | 1.343 | 43 | |
| 7 | Hull City | 38 | 16 | 9 | 13 | 53 | 37 | 1.432 | 41 | |
| 8 | Bristol City | 38 | 16 | 9 | 13 | 52 | 50 | 1.040 | 41 | |
| 9 | Wolverhampton Wanderers | 38 | 18 | 5 | 15 | 51 | 52 | 0.981 | 41 | |
| 10 | Bury | 38 | 15 | 10 | 13 | 39 | 40 | 0.975 | 40 | |
| 11 | Fulham | 38 | 16 | 6 | 16 | 46 | 43 | 1.070 | 38 | |
| 12 | Stockport County | 38 | 13 | 10 | 15 | 55 | 57 | 0.965 | 36 | |
| 13 | Huddersfield Town | 38 | 13 | 8 | 17 | 47 | 53 | 0.887 | 34 | |
| 14 | Birmingham | 38 | 12 | 10 | 16 | 48 | 60 | 0.800 | 34 | |
| 15 | Grimsby Town | 38 | 13 | 8 | 17 | 42 | 58 | 0.724 | 34 | |
| 16 | Blackpool | 38 | 9 | 14 | 15 | 33 | 44 | 0.750 | 32 | |
| 17 | Glossop | 38 | 11 | 6 | 21 | 51 | 67 | 0.761 | 28 | |
| 18 | Leicester Fosse | 38 | 11 | 4 | 23 | 45 | 61 | 0.738 | 26 | |
| 19 | Lincoln City | 38 | 10 | 6 | 22 | 36 | 66 | 0.545 | 26 | Re-elected |
| 20 | Nottingham Forest | 38 | 7 | 9 | 22 | 37 | 76 | 0.487 | 23 | Re-elected |

(C) Champions; (P) Promoted
