= Randolph Cemetery =

Historic cemetery in South Carolina, United States

- U.S. National Register of Historic Places
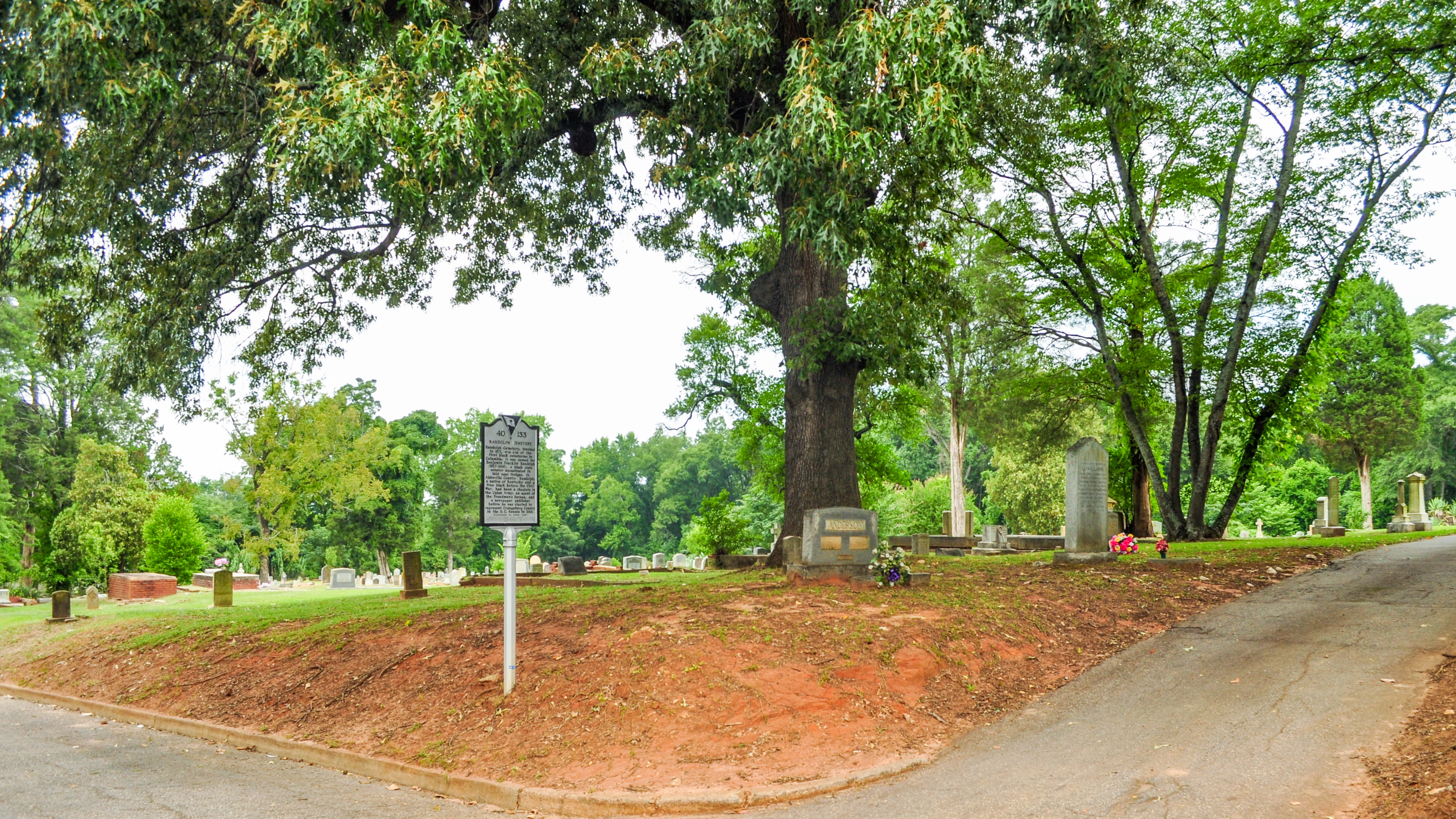

- Location within South Carolina Location within the United States
- Location: Western terminus of Elmwood Ave., Columbia, South Carolina
- Coordinates: 34°0′34″N 81°3′15″W
- Area: 4 acres (1.6 ha)
- Built: 1872, 1899
- NRHP reference No.: 94001573
- Added to NRHP: January 20, 1995

Randolph Cemetery is a historic cemetery for African-Americans in Columbia, South Carolina. It was established in 1872 and expanded in 1899. It was named for Benjamin F. Randolph (1820–1868), who was reburied at the cemetery in 1871. Randolph was a militia leader protecting African Americans when he was assassinated. A memorial in his honor and for other African-American leaders killed was erected. Gravemarkers include both manufactured and vernacular homemade varieties. The cemetery holds eight Reconstruction Era state legislators. It was added to the National Register of Historic Places in 1995.

== History ==
Randolph Cemetery was established as the first cemetery for Columbia's African-American population (up until then, African-Americans has been buried in the local potter's field called Lower Cemetery between the river and the current Randolph Cemetery). The cemetery initially consisted of three acres purchased from Elmwood Cemetery in 1872. An additional acre was purchased in 1899. Today it spans about six acres. But how those additional two acres were acquired is not clear.

The cemetery fell into decline as the descendants of those interred and the owners of the remaining plots moved away, many as part of the Great Migration. The area became wilderness by the middle of the 20th century.

The city of Columbia began to clear it out with bulldozers as part of its urban renewal program in 1959, but the clearing was halted when Minnie Simons Williams, a local resident, drew the city's attention to the historical significance of the cemetery. Williams, along with descendants of the founders of the cemetery, reestablished the Randolph Cemetery Association and were given (through a legal suit) stewardship of the cemetery. The association has organized donations and volunteers to restore and maintain the cemetery.

== Notable burials ==
- Henry Cardozo (1830–1886), state senator
- George Elmore, businessman who challenged South Carolina's whites-only Democratic Party primary system
- William Fabriel Myers (1850–1917), state senator
- William Beverly Nash (1822–1888), state senator
- Robert John Palmer (1849–1928), state representative and great-great grandfather of Dave Chappelle
- Benjamin Franklin Randolph (d 1868) state senator assassinated by three members of the Ku Klux Klan
- William Simons (d 1878), state representative
- Samuel Benjamin Thompson (1837–1909), state representative
- Charles McDuffie Wilder (1835–1902), postmaster and city council member in Columbia, South Carolina
- Lucius Wimbush (1839–1872), state senator

== Gallery ==
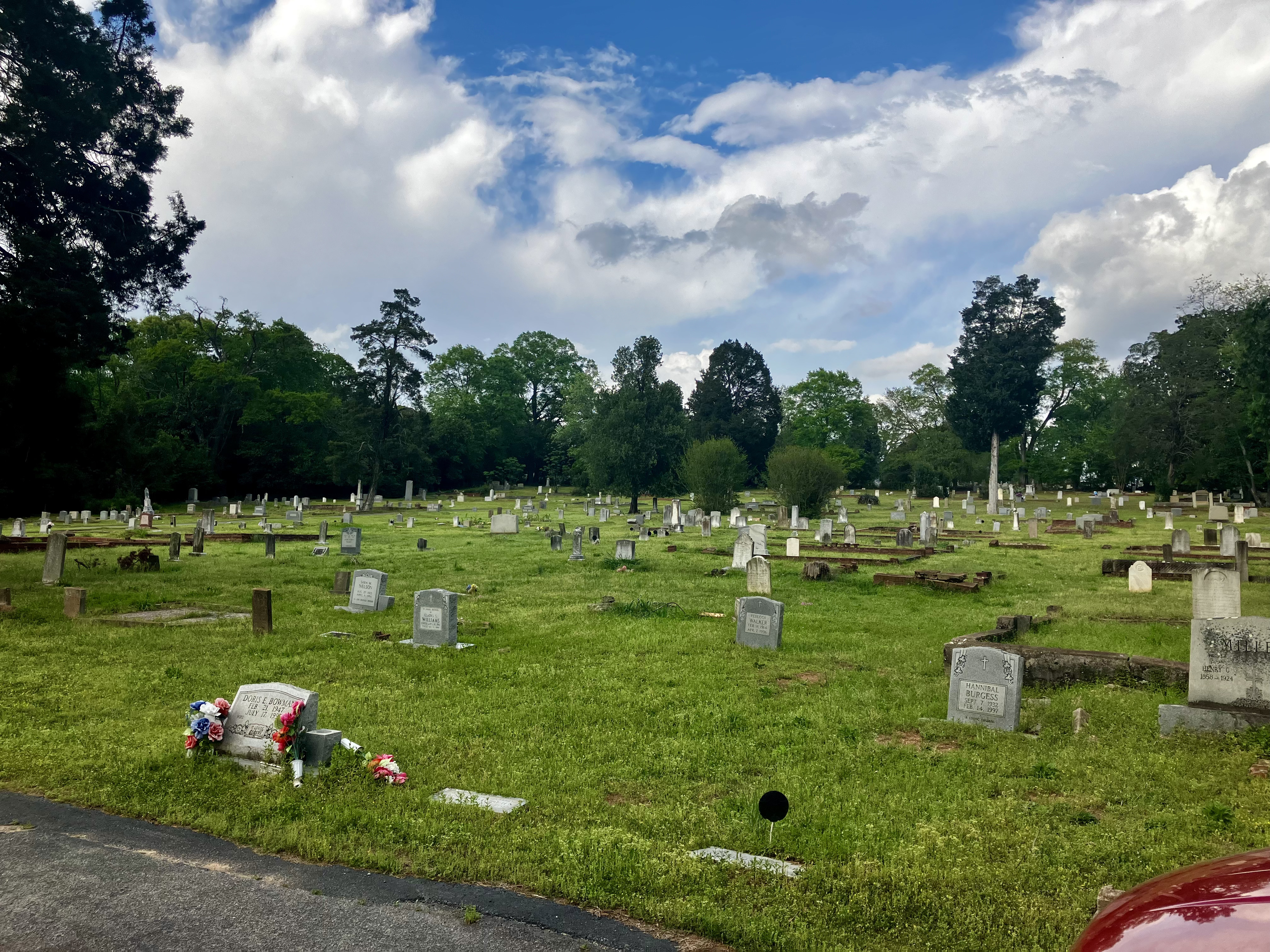
Facing eastward

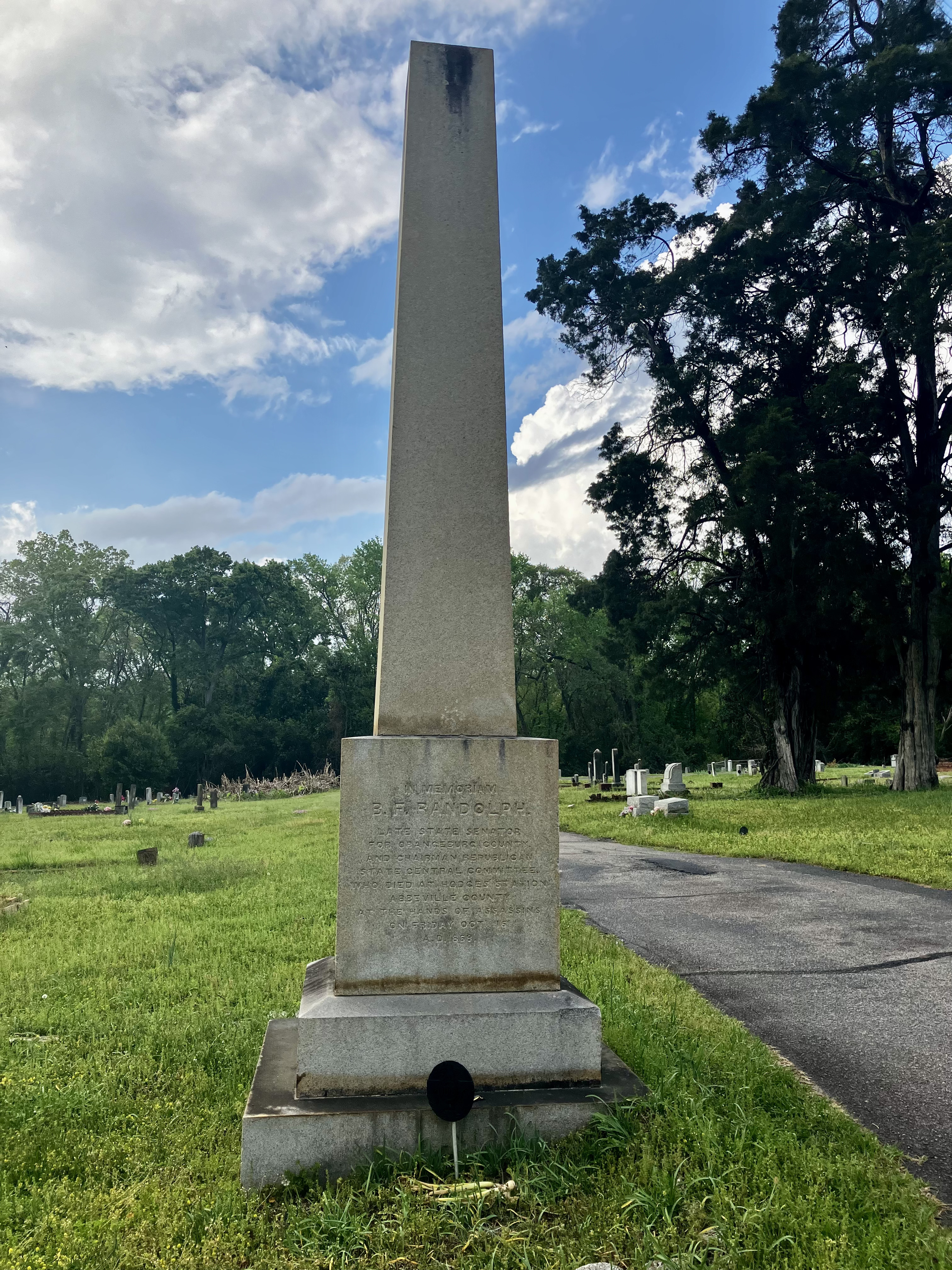
Benjamin Franklin Randolph monument

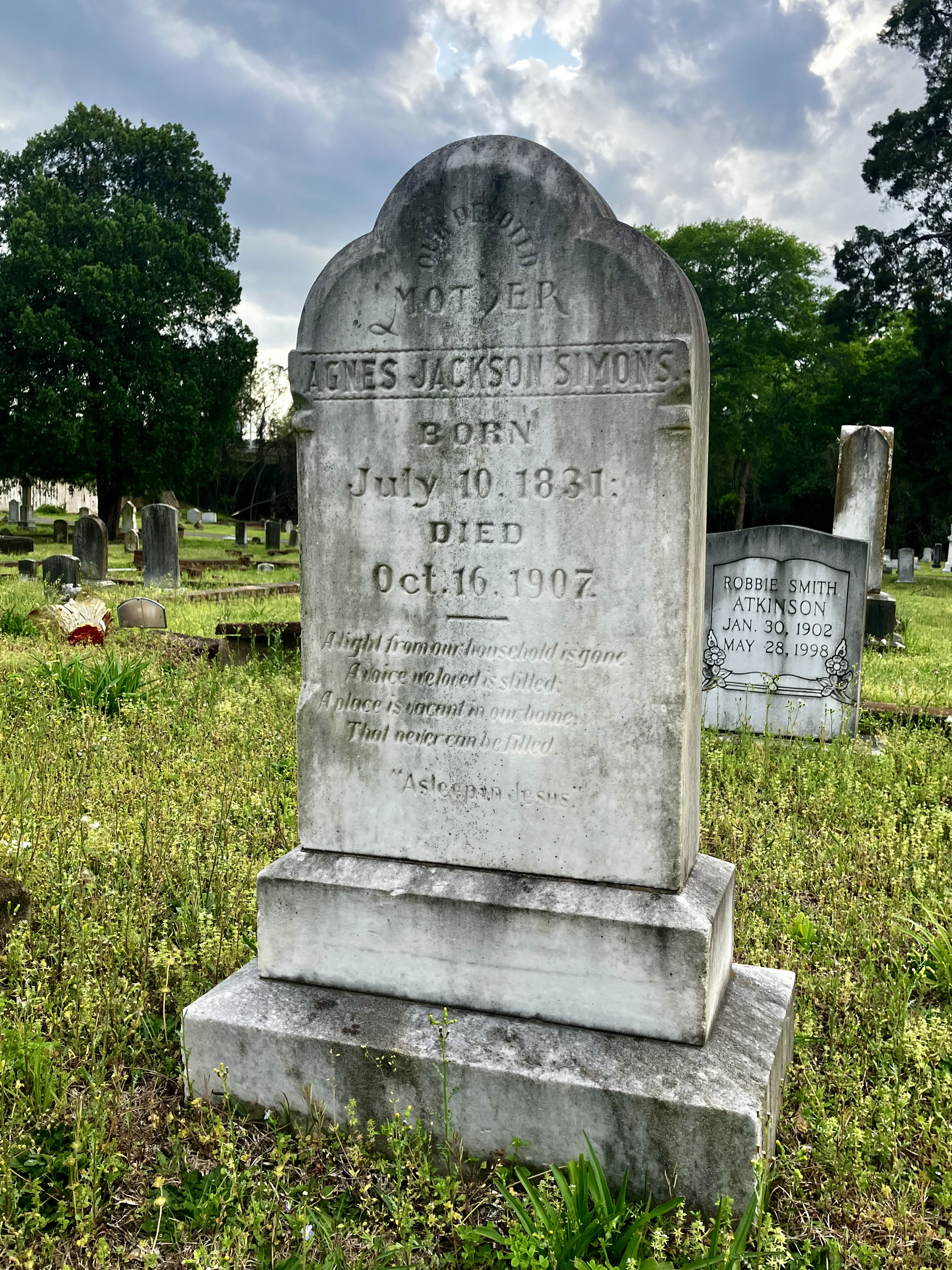
Grave of Agnes Jackson Simons, who constructed the Mann-Simons Cottage

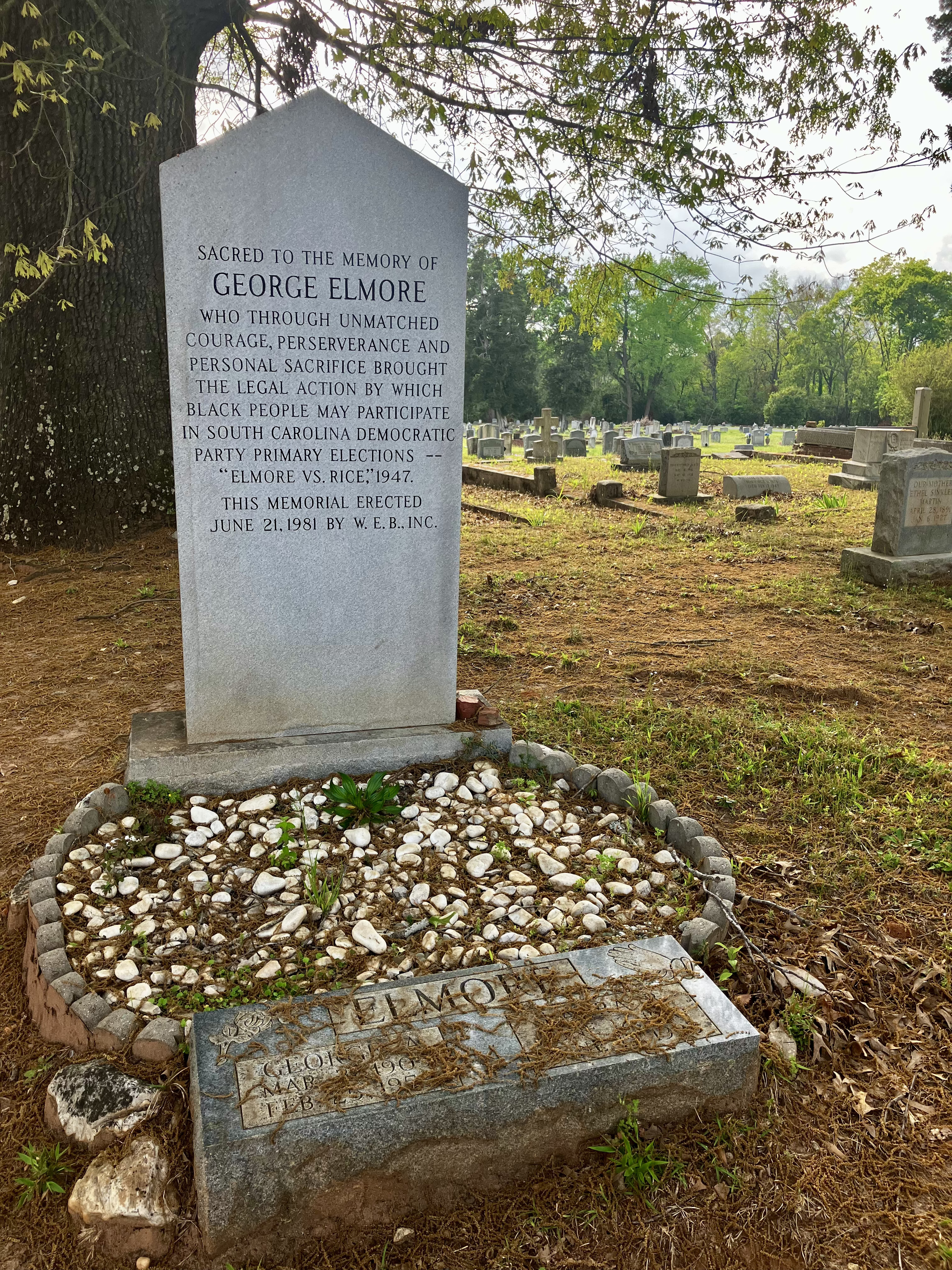
Grave and monument to George Elmore

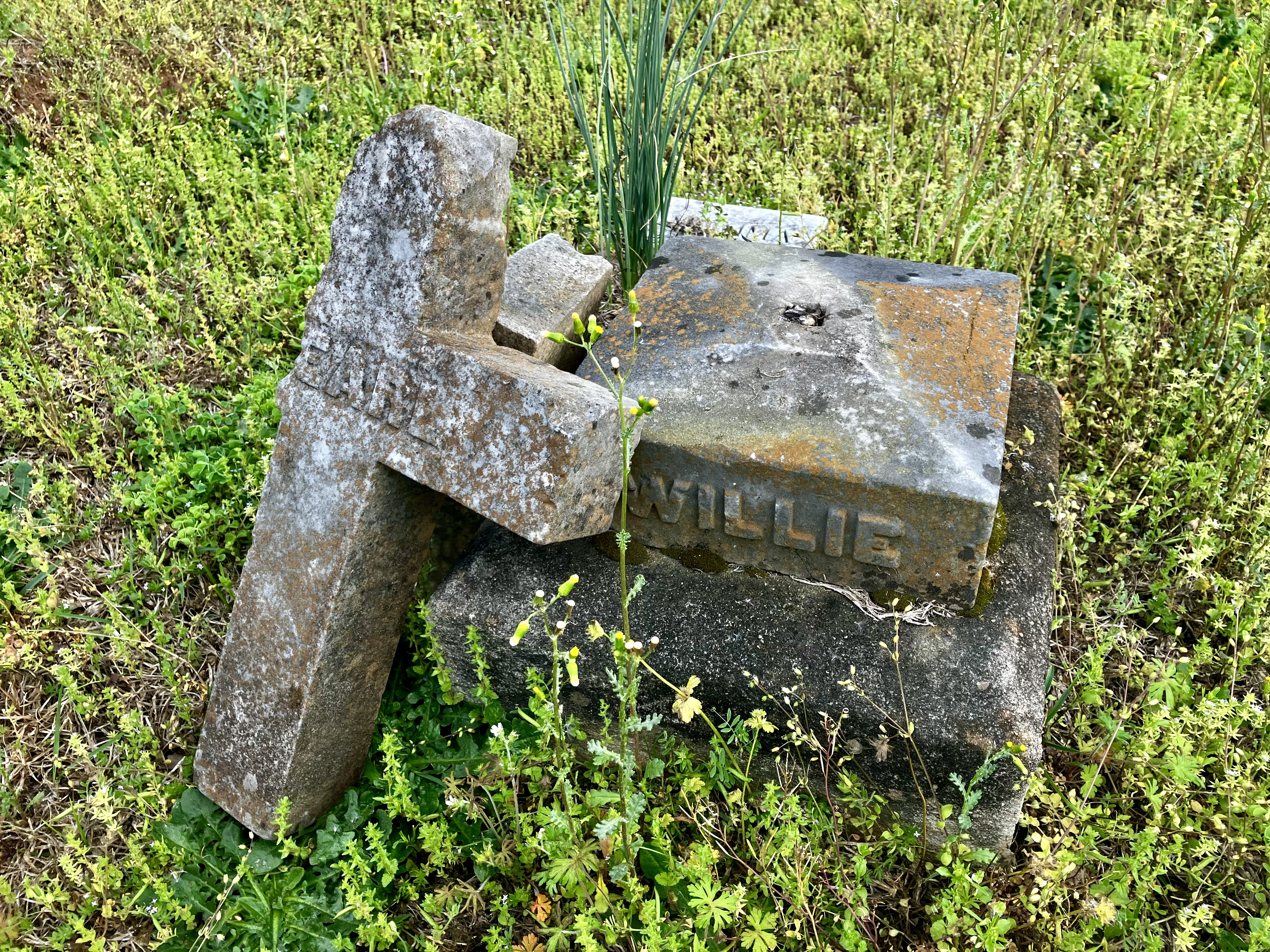
Broken cross sculpture

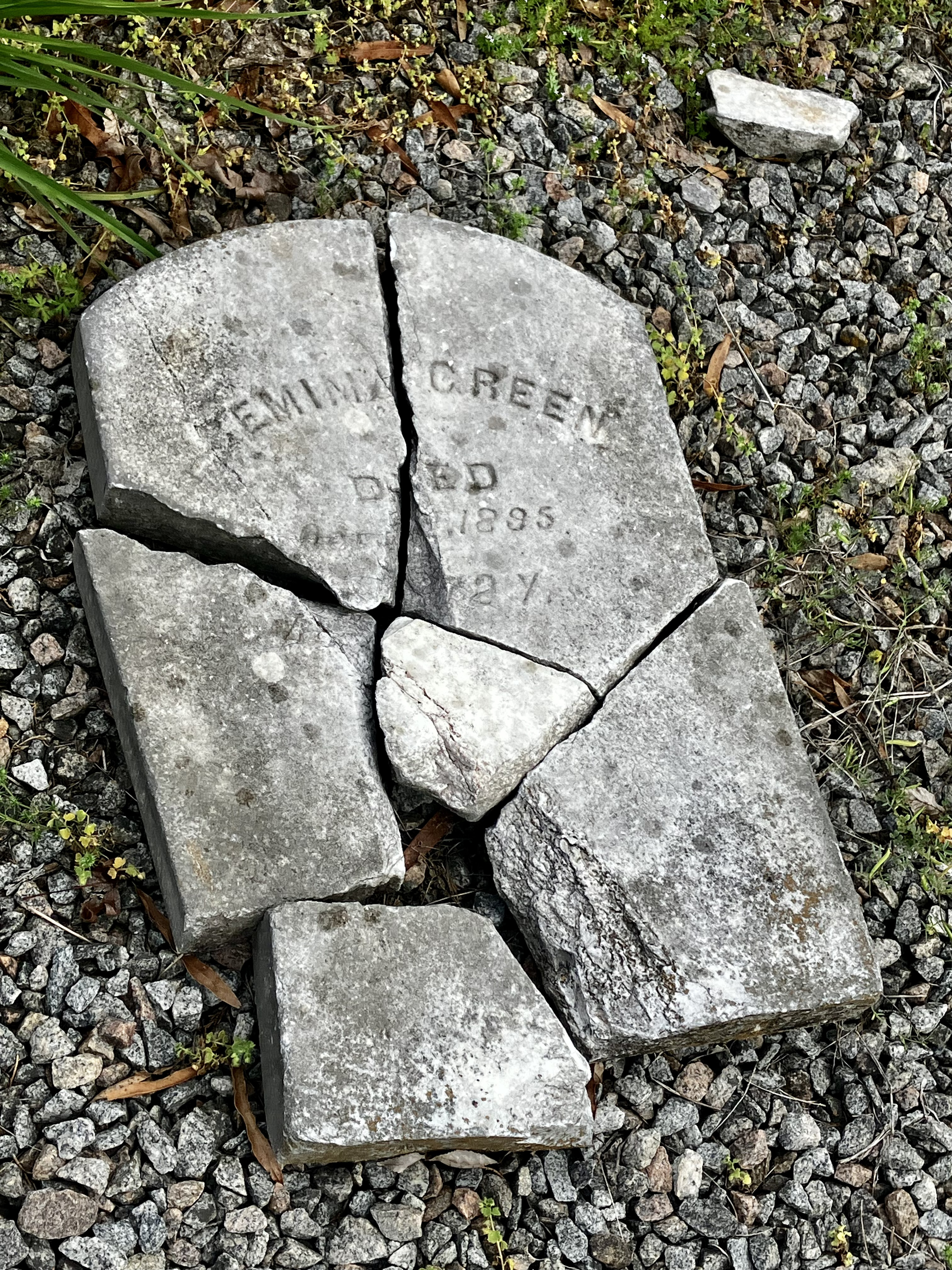
Broken headstone of Gemima Green
