= Harry Clarke (footballer, born 1921) =

English footballer and cricketer

Personal information
- Full name: James Henry Clarke
- Date of birth: 27 March 1921
- Place of birth: Darlington, England
- Date of death: 8 November 2015 (aged 94)
- Position: Centre forward

Senior career*
Years	Team	Apps	(Gls)
- Stanley United
1946–1947	Darlington	19	(17)
1947	Leeds United	14	(1)
1947–1949	Darlington	37	(24)
1949–1950	Hartlepools United	7	(1)
1950–1952	Stockton		
1952–1953	Darlington	14	(6)
- * Club domestic league appearances and goals

James Henry Clarke (27 March 1921 – 8 November 2015) was an English footballer who scored 49 goals from 91 appearances in the Football League playing for Darlington (in three spells), Leeds United and Hartlepools United in the years following the Second World War. Clarke was born in Darlington. A centre forward, he also played non-league football for clubs including Stanley United and Stockton. He also played Minor Counties cricket for Durham. Clarke died in 2015 at the age of 94.
