= George Barlow (footballer, born 1885) =

English footballer

Personal information
- Date of birth: 19 September 1885
- Date of death: 3 March 1921 (aged 35)

Senior career*
| Years | Team | Apps | (Gls) |
| 1907–1908 | Preston North End | | |
| 1908–1910 | Everton | | |
| 1910–1918 | Preston North End | | |

International career
| 1908–1913 | England Amateurs | 3 | |
| 1908 | Great Britain | 0 | (0) |
- * Club domestic league appearances and goals

George Barlow (19 September 1885 – 3 March 1921) was an English footballer. He was part of Great Britain's squad for the football tournament at the 1908 Summer Olympics, but he did not play in any matches.
