= Howard Junior High School =

- U.S. National Register of Historic Places
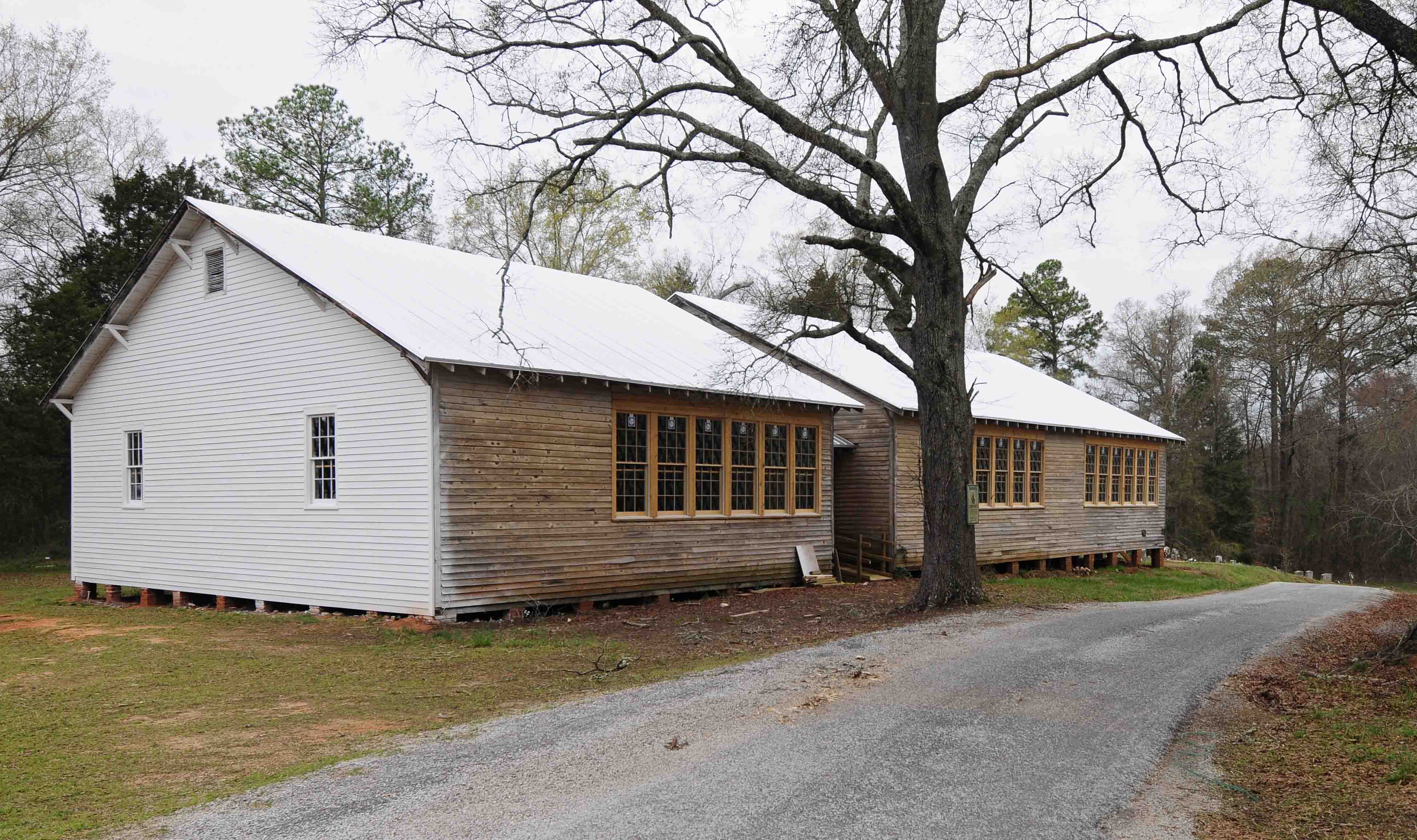
- Howard Junior High School, March 2012

- Location within South Carolina Location within the United States
- Location: 431 Shiloh St., Prosperity, South Carolina
- Coordinates: 34°12′58″N 81°32′32″W
- Area: 2.7 acres (1.1 ha)
- Built: 1925
- Architectural style: Late 19th And Early 20th Century American Movements
- NRHP reference No.: 05001577
- Added to NRHP: February 3, 2006

Howard Junior High School, also known as Prosperity School, Shiloh School, and Shiloh Rosenwald School, is a historic Rosenwald school located at Prosperity, Newberry County, South Carolina. It was built in 1924–1925, and is a one-story, frame, double-pile, rectangular building on an open brick pier foundation. It originally had four classrooms; two additional classrooms were added in the 1930s.

It was listed on the National Register of Historic Places in 2009.
