= Lance Robson =

English footballer (1939–1987)

Personal information
- Date of birth: 27 December 1939
- Place of birth: Newcastle upon Tyne, England
- Date of death: 30 November 1987 (aged 47)
- Position: Centre forward

Senior career*
Years	Team	Apps	(Gls)
1958–1960	Newcastle United	0	(0)
1960–1964	Darlington	144	(47)
1964–1966	Scarborough	?	(?)
1966–1968	Stockton	?	(?)
1968–1970	Darlington	69	(18)
1970	Hartlepool United	8	(2)
Total		221	(67)
- * Club domestic league appearances and goals

Lance Robson (27 December 1939 – 30 November 1987) was an English footballer who played as a centre forward, making over 200 appearances in the Football League.

== Career ==
Born in Newcastle upon Tyne, Robson turned professional with hometown team Newcastle United in 1958, but left in 1960 without making the first team. Robson later played for Darlington, Scarborough, Stockton and Hartlepool United, before retiring in 1970.

== Personal life ==
Robson was married to Barbara and had five children. He died in 1987, aged only 47.

During his footballing career, Robson was well known as the football-playing dentist. He operated a dental practice in Darlington, and following his death this dental practice continues, being run by one of his sons (also called Lance).
