= Harold Boulware =

American civil rights lawyer

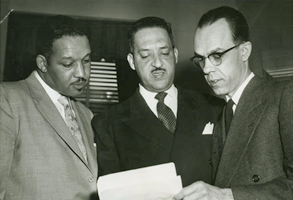
Boulware on left

Harold R. Boulware Sr. (March 1, 1913 - January 27, 1983) was a civil rights attorney and judge in the United States. He was chief attorney for the NAACP in South Carolina. He was involved in cases challenging segregation in school busing and the Democratic Party's whites only primaries in South Carolina. His cases included Briggs v. Elliott, Brown v. Board, and Davis v. County School Board of Prince Edward County. He became the first African-American appointed as an Associate Judge for the Columbia Municipal Court in August 1969 and served until 1974 when he became a judge in the Richland County Judicial System.

Boulware was born in Irmo, South Carolina in 1913. The son of Robert Walter and Mabel Hughes Boulware, his father was Dean of Harbison Agricultural Institute in Irmo where his mother taught music. He graduated from Harbison Agricultural Institute, Johnson C. Smith University in Charlotte, North Carolina, and Howard University Law School in Washington D.C.

He was mentored by Thurgood Marshall and Charles Houston. He passed the South Caroline bar examination and was licensed in 1940. He sued on behalf of a black applicant to the University of South Carolina's law school leading to the establishment of a law school for blacks at South Carolina State. He challenged unequal pay for black teachers.

He worked on the brief for the Gebhart v. Belton case. A 1947 letter he wrote about a school busing case survives.

He is buried at Upper Pine Grove Cemetery in Irmo, South Carolina. In 2019 the South Carolina House of Representatives adopted a resolution honoring him.
