= Alec Fraser (footballer) =

Scottish footballer

Personal information
- Full name: Alexander Fraser
- Date of birth: 1883
- Place of birth: Inverness, Scotland
- Position: Forward

Senior career*
Years	Team	Apps	(Gls)
- Inverness Thistle
1903–1904	Newcastle United	0	(0)
1904–1908	Fulham (Note: Infobox statistics for Fulham and Bradford Park Avenue include Football League matches only.)	10	(5)
1908–1909	Bradford Park Avenue	17	(6)
1909–1911	Darlington		(35)
1912–1913	Middlesbrough	5	(0)
1913–191?	Newcastle City		
- * Club domestic league appearances and goals

Alexander Fraser (1883 – after 1914) was a Scottish footballer who played in the Football League for Fulham, Bradford Park Avenue and Middlesbrough. He also played for Inverness Thistle, Newcastle United, Darlington and Newcastle City. During the majority of his career he played as a forward, in either the centre forward or inside left position.

== Football career ==
Fraser was born in Inverness, where he began his football career with his hometown club, Inverness Thistle of the Highland League. In late December 1903, he signed for English First Division club Newcastle United. His play improved while with Newcastle, to the extent that he was described as "a goal-getter much above the average", but he never played first-team football for that club, and moved on to Fulham of the Southern League in October 1904.

He earned himself a good reputation as a centre forward, but refused to re-sign for Fulham at the end of the season and was reported likely to resume his career back in Scotland with Aberdeen. No such move took place, and by January 1906 Fraser was back at Fulham. helping them win the 1906–07 Southern League title, After the club's election to the Football League in 1907, he scored five goals from ten Second Division appearances, and replaced the injured Fred Threlfall in the team that beat Manchester United 2–1 to reach the semi-finals of that season's FA Cup.

In April 1908, Fraser joined Bradford Park Avenue of the Southern League as a makeweight in the transfer of Harry Brown in the other direction. Bradford were elected to the Football League for 1908–09, and Fraser scored six goals from seventeen League appearances. He was transfer-listed at the end of the season, and signed for North-Eastern League club Darlington in late September 1909. He was the club's top scorer in each of his first two seasons, and in February 1912, he returned to the Football League with First Division club Middlesbrough.

He made his first appearance at that level on 5 April, deputising for the rested George Elliott at inside right in a 1–0 win at home to West Bromwich Albion. He injured a knee on the opening day of the 1912–13 season, and was not retained for the next; he had played five league matches without scoring. His last club was Newcastle City of the North-Eastern League.
