= Aaron Travis =

English footballer (1890–1966)

Personal information
- Full name: Aaron Travis
- Date of birth: 28 March 1890
- Place of birth: Manchester, England
- Date of death: 1966 (aged 75–76)
- Height: 5 ft 8 in (1.73 m)
- Position: Centre forward

Senior career*
Years	Team	Apps	(Gls)
1911–1912	Hurst	33	(31)
1912–1913	Norwich City		
1913	Hurst		
191?–1915	Darlington		
1915	Manchester United	0	(0)
–	Tranmere Rovers		
191?–1922	Darlington	11	(6)
–	Hurst Albion		
–	Ashton PSI		
- * Club domestic league appearances and goals

Aaron Travis (28 March 1890 – 1966) was an English footballer who played as a centre forward in the Football League for Darlington. He was on the books of Manchester United before the First World War and of Tranmere Rovers during it but never played for either in the League. He also played in the Manchester League and Lancashire Combination for Hurst, in the Southern League for Norwich City, and in the North-Eastern League for Darlington before their election to the Football League.

== Personal life ==
Travis was born in the Openshaw area of Manchester, the first child of Aaron Travis, a general labourer, and his wife Charlotte Elizabeth. He attended Thomas St Malpas St Board School. By 1901, Travis's father was working as a chimney sweep and the household comprised an additional four siblings, his widowed grandmother and two aunts. By 1911, the 21-year-old Travis was following his father's trade. He married Martha Brayton in 1915. Travis died in Darlington, County Durham in 1966 at the age of 76. Aaron served with the Machine Gun Corps during the First World War.

== Football career ==
In 1911–12, Travis scored 31 goals from 33 matches as Hurst won the Manchester League with three matches to spare, and "scored twice and led the attack in fine style" in the semi-final to help his team reach the final of the Manchester Junior Cup, in which they beat Wilmslow 2–0. He then joined Southern League club Norwich City, and made his debut on 12 October 1912 at home to Portsmouth; the Evening News reported that "young Travis did very well in the centre, and was always on target with his shots". He finished the season with two goals from ten first-team appearances, and after a couple of months back with Hurst in the Lancashire Combination, he signed for reigning North-Eastern League champions Darlington.

Travis scored freely until the end of the season, his goal return including four of Darlington's five against Carlisle United in February. In a match against Wallsend, he and an opponent were sent off for fighting. Both players denied the charge, and witnesses supported their version of events, but they were both suspended for seven days from the start of the 1914–15 season. His prolific scoring continued. By early January 1915, he had 32 league goals, and by mid-March, when he signed for First Division club Manchester United, he had reached 38.

He made his Manchester United debut for their reserve team at home to Burnley reserves in the Central League: he scored a hat-trick. When league football was suspended at the end of the season for the duration of the First World War, he had not played for their first team. During the war, he appeared not only for Manchester United but also for other clubs, including Tranmere Rovers and his former club Hurst.

By December 1919, Travis was back with Darlington, scoring four times in a 9–2 defeat of Bishop Auckland in the North-Eastern League and twice as his club eliminated his former club Norwich City from the FA Cup. Drawn against First Division Sheffield Wednesday in the first round proper, Travis had a goal disallowed because Dick Healey was standing in an offside position; the match finished goalless. He did not play in the replay, which Darlington won 2–0, but had returned to the side for the second-round visit to Birmingham, which they lost 4–0. He scored the only goal of the Durham Senior Cup final against Durham City.

In 1920–21, Darlington again reached the first round proper of the FA Cup, and again took their Football League opponents to a replay. Travis came into the team at inside right against Blackpool and scored, but Darlington went out 2–1. In the league, they went one better than the previous season, won their second North-Eastern League title, and were elected to the newly formed Northern Section of the Third Division. Travis was not a regular in the Football League side. He played eleven matches and scored six goals, five of which came over the Christmas and New Year period: both goals of a 2–0 win at Lincoln City, one of five against Walsall, and two of five against Ashington. Press rumours suggesting that Travis and Arthur Wolstenholme had been offered in exchange for a Hartlepools United player were partly denied: the Darlington club secretary insisted that Wolstenholme was unavailable "to Hartlepools or any other club". Travis played occasionally at the end of the season, and had to take over in goal at Southport Central in April when Andy Greig broke his arm. He returned home at the end of the season, and played local football for Hurst Albion and Ashton PSI.
