= George Elmore (footballer) =

English footballer (1880–1916)

Personal information
- Full name: George V. Elmore
- Date of birth: 1880
- Place of birth: Witton, England
- Date of death: 1 July 1916 (aged 36)
- Place of death: Ovillers-la-Boisselle, France
- Position: Forward

Senior career*
Years	Team	Apps	(Gls)
–1897	Witton Villa		
1897–1898	Northwich Victoria		
1898–1899	Broadheath		
1899–1900	Winnington Park		
1900–1902	Witton Albion		
1902–1903	Broadheath		
1903	West Bromwich Albion	3	(1)
1903–1904	Bristol Rovers	21	(5)
1904	Witton Albion		
1904–1907	Altrincham		
1907–1909	Glossop	34	(14)
1909–1910	Blackpool	34	(6)
1910–1912	Partick Thistle	52	(18)
1912–1917	St Mirren	62	(17)
1914	→ Witton Albion (loan)		
1915	→ St Bernard's (loan)	4	(1)
1915	→ Broxburn United (loan)		
- * Club domestic league appearances and goals

George V. Elmore (1880 – 1 July 1916) was an English professional footballer who played in the Football League for Glossop, Blackpool and West Bromwich Albion as a forward. He also played in the Scottish League for St Mirren and Partick Thistle and is regarded as Altrincham's 'first star player'.

== Personal life ==
Elmore worked in the salt trade in Northwich. In September 1914, one month after Britain's entry into the First World War, he enlisted in the Royal Scots. Elmore was deployed on the Western Front in January 1916 and was serving as a lance corporal when he was killed in Sausage Valley on the first day of the Somme. He is commemorated on the Thiepval Memorial.

== Career statistics ==
Appearances and goals by club, season and competition
Club	Season	League			National cup (Note: Includes FA Cup, Scottish Cup)		Total	
Club	Season	Division	Apps	Goals	Apps	Goals	Apps	Goals
West Bromwich Albion	1902–03	First Division	3	1	1	0	4	1
Bristol Rovers	1903–04	Southern League First Division	21	5	3	0	24	5
Partick Thistle	1910–11	Scottish League First Division	32	12	2	3	34	15
Partick Thistle	1911–12	Scottish League First Division	20	6	2	0	22	6
Partick Thistle	Total		52	18	4	3	56	21
St Mirren	1912–13	Scottish League First Division	34	9	4	3	38	12
St Mirren	1913–14	Scottish League First Division	28	8	4	0	32	8
St Mirren	Total		62	17	8	3	70	20
Career total			138	41	16	6	154	47

== Honours ==
Witton Albion

- Cheshire Senior Cup: 1901–02
- Crewe & District Cup: 1900–01

Altrincham

- Manchester League: 1904–05, 1906–07
- Cheshire Senior Cup: 1904–05
