= 2009–10 Darlington F.C. season =

Darlington
2009–10 season
- Chairman: Raj Singh
- Manager: Colin Todd; (until 26 September 2009); Craig Liddle; (caretaker, until 6 October 2009 (Note: Staunton's appointment was announced on 5 October 2009, but Liddle took the team for the following day's fixture.)); Steve Staunton; (until 21 March 2010); Craig Liddle and Neil Maddison; (caretakers, until 1 April); Simon Davey; (until 16 June 2010); Ryan Kidd; (until 28 June 2010); Mark Cooper; (from 29 June 2010)
- League Two: 24th (relegated)
- FA Cup: First round (eliminated by Barnet)
- Football League Cup: First round (eliminated by Leeds United)
- Football League Trophy: Second round (eliminated by Leeds United)
- Top goalscorer: League: Tadhg Purcell (9); All: Tadhg Purcell (9)
- Highest home attendance: 2,744 (vs Bradford City, 5 December 2009)
- Lowest home attendance: 1,296 (vs Aldershot Town, 23 March 2010)
- Average home league attendance: 1,943

The 2009–10 season was Darlington Football Club's 81st season in the Football League and their 18th consecutive season in the fourth tier of English football, Football League Two. It covered the period from 1 July 2009 to 30 June 2010.

The season began with the club in administration, from which it exited just in time for the team to compete in the League Two season. After four matches they were bottom of the table, and bottom they remained for the rest of the season, with relegation to the Conference confirmed with six matches still to play. Three first-team managers took charge during the playing season, and there were two further managerial resignations and appointments during June 2010. The team lost in the first round of both the FA Cup and the League Cup and in the second round of the Football League Trophy.

== Background and summary ==
In February 2009, Darlington F.C. chairman George Houghton had placed the club into administration, which obliged the Football League to impose a 10-point deduction. The team finished the 2008–09 season in 12th place in League Two, only seven points below the promotion play-off places. Despite closing the west stand at the Darlington Arena to cut costs, and fund-raising projects, which included a match between the club's 1999-2000 play-off team and an All-Stars team featuring former Darlington players Bernie Slaven and Marco Gabbiadini under the captaincy of former England international midfielder Paul Gascoigne that attracted a crowd of over 3,000, no buyer for the club was found by a 5 May deadline. The "majority of the first-team squad" were made available on free transfers, and assistant manager Martin Gray and most of the coaching staff and administrative staff were laid off. Craig Liddle and Neil Maddison took caretaker charge of the team.

On 20 May, Houghton returned as owner and chairman; he appointed former Middlesbrough manager Colin Todd as manager, and issued a statement confirming he was "not going to let the club die" so would continue funding until a buyer was found. Shortly afterwards, a deal was agreed such that Raj Singh would become chairman with full control of club and stadium and he and Houghton would each own half of the surrounding land. Darlington exited administration on 7 August, with approval from the Football League to participate in the 2009–10 League Two season. On 3 August, 13 players were officially registered, several of whom had been with the club in 2008–09; a further 4 arrived before the end of the month.

The team gained only two points from the first nine matches, and Todd left on 26 September. He and the chairman disagreed as to whose idea his departure was. After two matches with Liddle as caretaker – both defeats – former Republic of Ireland manager Steve Staunton took over until the end of the season, with Kevin Richardson as his assistant.

In early December it emerged that a dispute had arisen over a clause in the contract of captain Steve Foster, the club's highest-paid player. Foster had shown loyalty to the club by accepting a pay cut with a clause that guaranteed him the offer of a contract extension if he made 20 appearances during the season. With two matches to go, Staunton confirmed that Foster would not be selected unless he rescinded that clause – the club's financial state precluded making that sort of offer when they might not even be in the Football League next season – and underlined his resolve by naming Ian Miller as captain. Although both parties wanted the situation resolved, Foster stood his ground and was released at the end of February having made 19 appearances in 2009–10.

In the January transfer window, Staunton brought in several Irish players on temporary or short-term deals, including St Patrick's Athletic midfielder Gary Dempsey, former Shamrock Rovers striker Tadhg Purcell, teenage defender Simon Madden, and former Inverness Caledonian Thistle defender Richie Byrne. He also signed former Darlington defender Alan White on loan, and youngsters Gareth Waite, a midfielder from Spennymoor Town, and former Hibernian striker Patrick Deane on six-month deals.

The team had been bottom of the league since the fourth match of the season, and attendances were falling. The loss at home to Barnet on 20 March attracted a record low crowd of 1,463 and left the team 19 points from safety. Feeling there was no alternative, Singh sacked Staunton the next day, recognising that "a lot of fans voted with their feet" – the attendance record fell to 1,296 at the next match – and he needed to appoint a manager to prepare for a promotion season in the Conference. Former Barnsley manager and Darlington player Simon Davey was appointed on 1 April, and despite two wins in his first four matches, relegation was confirmed on 13 April with six matches still to play. For the final fixture, he selected three youth-team players in the starting eleven and used a fourth, the 16-year-old Jordan Marshall, as a second-half substitute.

Having begun to build a squad for the coming season, Davey quit on 16 June. His assistant, Ryan Kidd, signed a two-year contract before having second thoughts, and Mark Cooper, who had been Singh's first choice to replace Staunton, signed a one-year deal on 29 June.

== League table (part) ==
Pos	Team	Pld	W	D	L	GF	GA	GD	Pts	Promotion, qualification or relegation
20	Lincoln City	46	13	11	22	42	65	−23	50	
21	Barnet	46	12	12	22	47	63	−16	48	
22	Cheltenham Town	46	10	18	18	54	71	−17	48	
23	Grimsby Town (R)	46	9	17	20	45	71	−26	44	Relegation to Conference National
24	Darlington (R)	46	8	6	32	33	87	−54	30	Relegation to Conference National

Updated to match(es) played on unknown. Source: football-league.co.uk
(R) Relegated

== Match results ==
General source: Match content not verifiable from these sources is referenced individually.

Date	League position	Opponents	Venue	Result	Score F–A	Scorers	Attendance
8 August 2009	20th	Aldershot Town	A	L	1–3	Dowson 85'	2,866
15 August 2009	23rd	Bury	H	L	0–1		2,310
18 August 2009	23rd	Crewe Alexandra	H	L	0–1		1,821
22 August 2009	24th	Port Vale	A	L	0–1		4,561
29 August 2009	24th	Cheltenham Town	H	D	1–1	Gall 71'	1,840
5 September 2009	24th	Lincoln City	A	L	0–3		3,005
11 September 2009	24th	Accrington Stanley	A	L	1–2	Gall 59'	3,228
19 September 2009	24th	AFC Bournemouth	H	L	0–2		1,999
26 September 2009	24th	Grimsby Town	A	D	1–1	Main 81'	4,014
29 September 2009	24th	Rochdale	H	L	0–2		1,748
3 October 2009	24th	Macclesfield Town	H	L	0–1		1,763
10 October 2009	24th	Dagenham & Redbridge	A	L	0–2		1,981
17 October 2009	24th	Shrewsbury Town	H	W	2–1	Devitt 26', Thomas 56'	1,958
24 October 2009	24th	Barnet	A	L	0–3		2,313
31 October 2009	24th	Hereford United	A	L	1–2	Collins 72'	2,238
14 November 2009	24th	Burton Albion	H	W	1–0	Main 7'	2,404
21 November 2009	24th	Chesterfield	A	L	2–5	Collins 59', Hogg 87'	3,460
28 November 2009	24th	Morecambe	H	L	0–4		1,698
1 December	24th	Notts County	A	L	0–4		4,606
5 December 2009	24th	Bradford City	H	L	0–1		2,744
12 December 2009	24th	Torquay United	A	L	0–5		2,434
19 January 2010	24th	Rotherham United	A	W	2–1	Purcell 47', G. Smith 63'	3,234
23 January 2010	24th	Crewe Alexandra	A	L	0–3		3,717
26 January 2010	24th	Northampton Town	H	L	1–2	Purcell 29'	1,694
6 February 2010	24th	Rotherham United	H	W	2–0	Purcell 19', Waite 52'	2,231
9 February 2010	24th	Lincoln City	H	D	1–1	Dempsey 38'	1,697
13 February 2010	24th	Morecambe	A	L	0–2		1,741
20 February 2010	24th	Chesterfield	H	L	2–3	Purcell 27', 53'	2,209
27 February 2010	24th	Bradford City	A	L	0–1		11,532
2 March 2010	24th	Port Vale	H	L	1–3	Purcell 6'	1,582
6 March 2010	24th	Torquay United	H	L	1–3	Main 54'	1,819
9 March 2010	24th	Bury	A	D	1–1	Purcell 32' pen.	2,123
13 March 2010	24th	Northampton Town	A	L	0–2		4,755
20 March 2010	24th	Barnet	H	L	1–2	Breen 57' o.g.	1,463
23 March 2010	24th	Aldershot Town	H	L	1–2	Arnison 85'	1,296
27 March 2010	24th	Shrewsbury Town	A	W	2–0	Purcell 8', Diop 87'	5,081
3 April 2010	24th	Burton Albion	A	W	2–1	Gray 22', White 32'	2,779
5 April 2010	24th	Hereford United	H	L	0–1		2,131
10 April 2010	24th	Accrington Stanley	H	D	0–0		1,545
13 April 2010	24th	Rochdale	A	W	1–0	Mulligan 35'	5,371
17 April 2010	24th	AFC Bournemouth	A	L	0–2		6,464
20 April 2010	24th	Cheltenham Town	A	D	3–3	Purcell 2', Eastham 5' o.g., Diop 27'	2,836
24 April 2010	24th	Grimsby Town	H	L	0–2		1,911
27 April 2010	24th	Notts County	H	L	0–5		2,112
1 May 2010	24th	Macclesfield Town	A	W	0–2	Miller 9', M. Smith 79'	1,716
8 May 2010	24th	Dagenham & Redbridge	H	L	0–2		2,720

=== FA Cup ===
FA Cup match details
Round	Date	Opponents	Venue	Result	Score F–A	Scorers	Attendance	Refs
First round	7 November 2009	Barnet	A	L	1–3	Diop 73'	1,654	

=== Football League Cup ===
League Cup match details
Round	Date	Opponents	Venue	Result	Score F–A	Scorers	Attendance	Refs
First round	10 August 2009	Leeds United	H	L	0–1		4,487	

=== Football League Trophy ===
Football League Trophy match details
Round	Date	Opponents	Venue	Result	Score F–A	Scorers	Attendance	Refs
First round	1 September 2009	Lincoln City	H	W	1–0	Thorpe 27'	828	
Second round	6 October 2009	Leeds United	A	L	1–2	Convery 45+1'	8,429	

== Appearances and goals ==
Numbers in parentheses denote appearances as substitute.
Players with name and squad number struck through and marked † left the club during the playing season.
Players with names in italics and marked * were on loan from another club for the whole of their season with Darlington.
Players listed with no appearances have been in the matchday squad but only as unused substitutes.
Key to positions: GK – Goalkeeper; DF – Defender; MF – Midfielder; FW – Forward

Players included in matchday squads
No.	Pos.	Nat.	Name	League		FA Cup		League Cup		FL Trophy		Total		Discipline	
No.	Pos.	Nat.	Name	Apps	Goals	Apps	Goals	Apps	Goals	Apps	Goals	Apps	Goals	A yellow rectangle, denoting the yellow penalty card shown to a player being cautioned	A red rectangle, denoting the red penalty card shown to a player being sent off
2	DF	ENG	Paul Arnison	17 (1)	1	0 (0)	0	1 (0)	0	2 (0)	0	20 (1)	1	4	0
21	DF	ENG	Rikki Bains	3 (1)	0	0 (0)	0	0 (0)	0	0 (1)	0	3 (2)	0	0	0
26	FW	ENG	Corey Barnes	4 (2)	0	1 (0)	0	0 (0)	0	1 (0)	0	6 (2)	0	1	0
28	DF	ENG	Moses Barnett *	4 (0)	0	1 (0)	0	0 (0)	0	0 (0)	0	5 (0)	0	0	0
11	MF	ENG	James Bennett	3 (1)	0	0 (0)	0	0 (0)	0	0 (1)	0	3 (2)	0	0	0
3	DF	ENG	Mark Bower	12 (1)	0	0 (0)	0	1 (0)	0	1 (0)	0	14 (1)	0	0	0
31	DF	ENG	Dan Burn	2 (2)	0	0 (0)	0	0 (0)	0	0 (0)	0	2 (2)	0	0	0
33	DF	IRL	Richie Byrne	2 (2)	0	0 (0)	0	0 (0)	0	0 (0)	0	2 (2)	0	2	0
19	MF	ENG	Jamie Chandler	12 (2)	0	0 (0)	0	1 (0)	0	1 (0)	0	14 (2)	0	6	1
25	MF	SCO	Ross Chisholm	2 (1)	0	0 (0)	0	0 (0)	0	0 (0)	0	2 (1)	0	0	0
23	FW	IRL	James Collins	5 (2)	2	1 (0)	0	0 (0)	0	0 (0)	0	6 (2)	2	3	0
18	MF	ENG	Mark Convery	9 (12)	0	1 (0)	0	0 (0)	0	1 (1)	1	11 (13)	1	0	0
23	FW	ENG	Jordan Cook *	4 (1)	0	0 (0)	0	0 (0)	0	0 (0)	0	4 (1)	0	0	0
22	MF	ENG	David Davis *	5 (0)	0	1 (0)	0	0 (0)	0	0 (0)	0	6 (0)	0	3	0
29	FW	SCO	Patrick Deane	0 (10)	0	0 (0)	0	0 (0)	0	0 (0)	0	0 (10)	0	0	0
11	MF	IRL	Gary Dempsey	24 (0)	1	0 (0)	0	0 (0)	0	0 (0)	0	24 (0)	1	3	0
22	MF	IRL	Jamie Devitt *	5 (1)	1	0 (0)	0	0 (0)	0	1 (0)	0	6 (1)	1	2	0
30	FW	FRA	Mor Diop	18 (5)	2	0 (1)	1	0 (0)	0	0 (0)	0	18 (6)	3	3	0
20	FW	ENG	David Dowson *	6 (4)	1	0 (0)	0	1 (0)	0	0 (1)	0	7 (5)	1	0	0
5	DF	ENG	Steve Foster	15 (1)	0	1 (0)	0	1 (0)	0	1 (0)	0	18 (1)	0	0	0
24	FW	WAL	Kevin Gall	9 (1)	2	0 (0)	0	0 (0)	0	2 (0)	0	11 (1)	2	1	0
20	DF	ENG	Stuart Giddings	22 (0)	0	0 (0)	0	0 (0)	0	0 (0)	0	22 (0)	0	3	0
12	MF	ENG	Josh Gray	10 (17)	1	0 (1)	0	0 (0)	0	0 (0)	0	10 (18)	1	2	0
16	MF	ENG	Danny Groves	8 (8)	0	0 (0)	0	0 (0)	0	1 (0)	0	9 (8)	0	1	0
32	DF	ENG	Danny Hall *	3 (0)	0	0 (0)	0	0 (0)	0	0 (0)	0	3 (0)	0	2	0
33	MF	ENG	Paul Harsley *	3 (0)	0	0 (0)	0	0 (0)	0	0 (0)	0	3 (0)	0	2	0
28	MF	ENG	Jonathan Hogg *	5 (0)	1	0 (0)	0	0 (0)	0	0 (0)	0	5 (0)	1	1	0
25	GK	ENG	Russell Hoult *	6 (0)	0	0 (0)	0	0 (0)	0	0 (0)	0	6 (0)	0	0	0
25	GK	ENG	Ashlee Jones	1 (0)	0	0 (0)	0	0 (0)	0	0 (0)	0	1 (0)	0	0	0
33	DF	NIR	Tony Kane *	4 (0)	0	0 (0)	0	0 (0)	0	0 (0)	0	4 (0)	0	1	0
1	GK	ENG	David Knight	7 (0)	0	0 (0)	0	1 (0)	0	1 (0)	0	9 (0)	0	0	0
13	GK	ENG	Nick Liversedge	13 (0)	0	1 (0)	0	0 (0)	0	1 (0)	0	15 (0)	0	0	1
8	MF	ENG	Chris Lumsdon	2 (0)	0	0 (0)	0	1 (0)	0	0 (0)	0	3 (0)	0	0	0
22	DF	IRL	Simon Madden	13 (2)	0	0 (0)	0	0 (0)	0	0 (0)	0	13 (2)	0	2	0
15	FW	ENG	Curtis Main	12 (14)	3	0 (1)	0	0 (1)	0	0 (1)	0	12 (17)	3	2	0
25	FW	ENG	Jordan Marshall	0 (3)	0	0 (0)	0	0 (0)	0	0 (0)	0	0 (3)	0	0	0
27	MF	ENG	John McReady	3 (1)	0	0 (0)	0	0 (0)	0	0 (0)	0	3 (1)	0	0	0
6	DF	ENG	Ian Miller	40 (0)	1	0 (0)	0	1 (0)	0	2 (0)	0	43 (0)	1	3	0
19	DF	SCO	Andrew Milne	12 (1)	0	0 (0)	0	0 (0)	0	0 (0)	0	12 (1)	0	0	0
9	MF	ENG	Chris Moore	8 (3)	0	0 (0)	0	0 (0)	0	0 (0)	0	8 (3)	0	0	0
24	MF	ENG	Nathan Mulligan	10 (6)	1	0 (0)	0	0 (0)	0	0 (0)	0	10 (6)	1	3	0
4	DF	ENG	Matty Plummer	5 (3)	0	1 (0)	0	0 (1)	0	2 (0)	0	8 (4)	0	0	0
22	MF	ENG	Nathan Porritt *	4 (1)	0	0 (0)	0	0 (0)	0	1 (0)	0	5 (1)	0	0	0
19	FW	IRL	Tadhg Purcell	22 (0)	9	0 (0)	0	0 (0)	0	0 (0)	0	22 (0)	9	2	0
23	GK	IRL	Shane Redmond *	19 (0)	0	0 (0)	0	0 (0)	0	0 (0)	0	19 (0)	0	1	0
14	MF	ENG	Gary Smith	32 (2)	1	1 (0)	0	1 (0)	0	2 (0)	0	36 (2)	1	5	0
7	MF	ENG	Jeff Smith	22 (2)	0	1 (0)	0	1 (0)	0	1 (1)	0	25 (3)	0	0	0
32	FW	ENG	Michael Smith	3 (4)	1	0 (0)	0	0 (0)	0	0 (0)	0	3 (4)	1	0	0
29	FW	ENG	Simon Thomas *	7 (0)	1	1 (0)	0	0 (0)	0	0 (0)	0	8 (0)	1	2	0
9	FW	ENG	Lee Thorpe	7 (1)	0	0 (0)	0	1 (0)	0	1 (0)	1	9 (1)	1	3	0
28	MF	ENG	Gareth Waite	14 (0)	1	0 (0)	0	0 (0)	0	0 (0)	0	14 (0)	1	2	0
10	FW	ENG	Noel Whelan	2 (1)	0	0 (0)	0	0 (0)	0	0 (0)	0	2 (1)	0	0	0
4	DF	ENG	Alan White *	23 (1)	1	0 (0)	0	0 (0)	0	0 (0)	0	23 (1)	1	5	0
10	FW	ENG	Dean Windass	3 (3)	0	0 (0)	0	0 (0)	0	0 (1)	0	3 (4)	0	1	0

== Transfers ==
=== In ===
The Football League approved the club's exit from administration only in August 2009, so although deals had been agreed with a number of players, some of whom had appeared in pre-season matches, these players were not officially registered until 3 August 2009. These registrations also included those of players whose contracts could not be renewed until the club came out of administration.

Date	Pos	Player	Club	Fee	Ref
3 August 2009	DF	Paul Arnison	Bradford City	Free	
3 August 2009	MF	James Bennett	Hull City	Free	
3 August 2009	DF	Mark Bower	Bradford City	Free	
3 August 2009	DF	Mark Convery	Newcastle Blue Star	Free	
3 August 2009	DF	Steve Foster		Free	
3 August 2009	GK	David Knight	Mansfield Town	Free	
3 August 2009	GK	Nick Liversedge		Free	
3 August 2009	MF	Chris Lumsdon		Free	
3 August 2009	DF	Ian Miller		Free	
3 August 2009	DF	Matty Plummer		Free	
3 August 2009	MF	Gary Smith		Free	
3 August 2009	MF	Jeff Smith		Free	
3 August 2009	FW	Lee Thorpe		Free	
10 August 2009	DF	Dan Burn		Free	(Note: Registered as scholar)
14 August 2009	DF	Rikki Bains		Free	
21 August 2009	FW	Kevin Gall		Free	(Note: Signed on monthly contract)
24 August 2009	FW	Curtis Main		Free	
9 October 2009	FW	Noel Whelan		Free	(Note: Signed on non-contract terms)
22 October 2009	FW	Serigne Diop	SE Eivissa-Ibiza		
29 October 2009	GK	Ashlee Jones			
29 October 2009	MF	Nathan Mulligan	Norton & Stockton Ancients		
7 January 2010	MF	Gary Dempsey	St Patrick's Athletic	Free	
7 January 2010	FW	Tadhg Purcell	Shamrock Rovers	Free	
14 January 2010	DF	Simon Madden	Shamrock Rovers	Free	
15 January 2010	MF	Gareth Waite	Spennymoor Town		
15 January 2010	FW	Patrick Deane	Hibernian	Free	
1 February 2010	DF	Richie Byrne		Free	
2 March 2010	MF	Ross Chisholm	Shamrock Rovers	Free	
11 March 2010	MF	Chris Moore	Whitley Bay		

==== Loans in ====
Date	Pos	Name	From	Length	Notes
7 August 2009	MF	Jamie Chandler	Sunderland	Three months	(Note: Chandler's initial 28-day loan was extended to January 2010 under Todd's management, but was terminated by Staunton in late November.)
7 August 2009	FW	David Dowson	Sunderland	Three months	(Note: Dowson's initial 28-day loan was extended to January 2010 under Todd's management, but was terminated by Staunton.)
17 August 2009	MF	Nathan Porritt	Middlesbrough	One month	
18 August 2009	FW	Jordan Cook	Sunderland	One month	(Note: Cook's five-month loan was terminated early following an ACL injury.)
15 September 2009	MF	Jamie Devitt	Hull City	One month	
16 September 2009	GK	Russell Hoult	Notts County	One month	
17 September 2009	DF	Tony Kane	Carlisle United	One month	
9 October 2009	DF	Moses Barnett	Everton	One month	
16 October 2009	FW	Simon Thomas	Crystal Palace	Three months	
22 October 2009	FW	James Collins	Aston Villa	Three months	
22 October 2009	MF	David Davis	Wolverhampton Wanderers	Two months	
19 November 2009	MF	Jonathan Hogg	Aston Villa	Six weeks	
26 November 2009	DF	Andrew Milne	Leeds United	Five weeks	
26 November 2009	MF	Paul Harsley	Chesterfield	Five weeks	
26 November 2009	DF	Danny Hall	Chesterfield	Five weeks	
15 January 2010	DF	Alan White	Luton Town	End of season	
26 January 2010	GK	Shane Redmond	Nottingham Forest	One month	
5 March 2010	DF	Andrew Milne	Leeds United	End of season	

=== Out ===
Date	Pos	Name	To	Fee	Notes
22 October 2009	FW	Kevin Gall	York City	Contract expired	
8 December 2009	GK	David Knight	Histon	Mutual consent	
8 December 2009	MF	James Bennett	Ossett Town	Mutual consent	
8 December 2009	DF	Matty Plummer	North Ferriby United	Mutual consent	
16 February 2010	GK	Ashlee Jones		Mutual consent	
27 February 2010	DF	Steve Foster	Blyth Spartans	Mutual consent	
27 February 2010	FW	Lee Thorpe	Fleetwood Town	Mutual consent	
19 March 2010	MF	Jeff Smith		Contract cancelled	
5 April 2010	FW	Noel Whelan		Released	
12 April 2010	MF	Ross Chisholm		Released	
12 April 2010	FW	Patrick Deane		Released	

==== Loans out ====
Date	Pos	Name	To	Length	Notes
6 November 2009	DF	Rikki Bains	Blyth Spartans	Two months	
15 January 2010	DF	Rikki Bains	Gateshead	End of season	
29 January 2010	MF	Dan Riley	Billingham Town	One month	

== See also ==
- 2009–10 in English football
