= Patrick Deane =

Patrick Deane may refer to:

- Patrick Deane (footballer)
- Patrick Deane (professor)

== See also ==
- Patrick Dean (disambiguation)
