= List of English football transfers summer 2002 =

This is a list of English football transfers for the 2002 summer transfer window. Only moves featuring at least one Premier League or First Division club are listed.

The summer transfer window opened on 1 July 2002, although a few transfers took place prior to that date. Players without a club could join one at any time, either during or in between transfer windows. Clubs below Premier League level could also sign players on loan at any time. If need be, clubs could sign a goalkeeper on an emergency loan, if all others were unavailable.

== Transfers ==
Date	Name	Nat.	Moving from	Moving to	Fee
1 May 2002	Milenko Ačimovič	(Slovenia)	Red Star Belgrade	Tottenham Hotspur	Free
1 May 2002	Adam Newton	(Saint Kitts and Nevis)	West Ham United	Peterborough United	Free
2 May 2002	Richard Harris	(England)	Crystal Palace	Wycombe Wanderers	Free
2 May 2002	Franck Queudrue	(France)	Lens	Middlesbrough	£2.5m
3 May 2002	Ciaran Toner	(Northern Ireland)	Tottenham Hotspur	Leyton Orient	Free
7 May 2002	Kevin Dawson	(England)	Nottingham Forest	Chesterfield	£2.5m
8 May 2002	Paul Devlin	(Scotland)	Sheffield United	Birmingham City	£200k
9 May 2002	Dion Scott	(England)	Walsall	Mansfield Town	Free
10 May 2002	Filippo Amadio	(Italy)	Sheffield Wednesday	Lincoln City	Free
12 May 2002	Gary Rowett	(England)	Leicester City	Charlton Athletic	£2.5m
12 May 2002	Luke Steele	(England)	Peterborough United	Manchester United	£500k
13 May 2002	Gary McAllister	(Scotland)	Liverpool	Coventry City	Free
13 May 2002	Stefan Postma	(Netherlands)	De Graafschap	Aston Villa	£1.5m
14 May 2002	Dean Holden	(England)	Bolton Wanderers	Oldham Athletic	Free
15 May 2002	Mikkel Bischoff	(Denmark)	AB	Manchester City	£700k
15 May 2002	Kevin Muscat	(Australia)	Wolverhampton Wanderers	Rangers	Free
16 May 2002	Bruno Cheyrou	(France)	Lille	Liverpool	£4m
16 May 2002	Stuart Green	(England)	Newcastle United	Hull City	Loan
16 May 2002	Facundo Sava	(Argentina)	Gimnasia	Fulham	£2m
17 May 2002	Anthony Ormerod	(England)	Middlesbrough	Scarborough	Free
17 May 2002	Paul Rachubka	(England)	Manchester United	Charlton Athletic	£200k
18 May 2002	Marcus Allbäck	(Sweden)	Heerenveen	Aston Villa	£2m
20 May 2002	Sylvain Distin	(France)	Paris Saint-Germain	Manchester City	£4m
21 May 2002	Tyrone Loran	(Netherlands)	Volendam	Manchester City	Undisclosed
22 May 2002	Andy Todd	(England)	Charlton Athletic	Blackburn Rovers	£750k
27 May 2002	Mark Boyd	(England)	Newcastle United	Port Vale	Free
29 May 2002	Hayden Foxe	(Australia)	West Ham United	Portsmouth	£400k
30 May 2002	Robbie Savage	(Wales)	Leicester City	Birmingham City	£1.25m
6 June 2002	Arjan de Zeeuw	(Netherlands)	Wigan Athletic	Portsmouth	Free
6 June 2002	Patrick Suffo	(Cameroon)	Sheffield United	Numancia	Free
6 June 2002	Vicente Matías Vuoso	(Argentina)	Independiente	Manchester City	£3.5m
6 June 2002	Richard Hughes	(Scotland)	Bournemouth	Portsmouth	£50k
6 June 2002	Matthew Taylor	(England)	Luton Town	Portsmouth	£400k
7 June 2002	Nicolas Anelka	(France)	Paris Saint-Germain	Manchester City	£13m
7 June 2002	Alioune Touré	(France)	Manchester City	Paris Saint-Germain	Free
20 June 2002	Gunnar Halle	(Norway)	Bradford City	Lillestrøm	Free
22 June 2002	Rigobert Song	(Cameroon)	West Ham United	Lens	£1m
22 June 2002	Hugo Viana	(Portugal)	Sporting CP	Newcastle United	£8.5m
25 June 2002	El Hadji Diouf	(Senegal)	Lens	Liverpool	£10m
25 June 2002	Sebastian Pelzer	(Germany)	Kaiserslautern	Blackburn Rovers	£370k
25 June 2002	Michael Svensson	(Sweden)	Troyes	Southampton	£2m
26 June 2002	Youssef Sofiane	(France)	Auxerre	West Ham United	Free
28 June 2002	Raimond van der Gouw	(Netherlands)	Manchester United	West Ham United	Free
1 July 2002	Kieran Richardson	(England)	West Ham United	Manchester United	Undisclosed
1 July 2002	Florent Sinama Pongolle	(France)	Le Havre	Liverpool	Free
1 July 2002	Anthony Le Tallec	(France)	Le Havre	Liverpool	Free
1 July 2002	Kevin Muscat	(Australia)	Wolverhampton Wanderers	Rangers	Free
1 July 2002	Martín Herrera	(Argentina)	Alavés	Fulham	Free
1 July 2002	Jay-Jay Okocha	(Nigeria)	Paris Saint-Germain	Bolton Wanderers	Free
1 July 2002	Peter Schmeichel	(Denmark)	Aston Villa	Manchester City	Free
1 July 2002	Phil Babb	(Republic of Ireland)	Sporting CP	Sunderland	Free
1 July 2002	Enrique de Lucas	(Spain)	Espanyol	Chelsea	Free
1 July 2002	Shaka Hislop	(Trinidad and Tobago)	West Ham United	Portsmouth	Free
1 July 2002	Anwar Uddin	(England)	Sheffield Wednesday	Bristol Rovers	Free
1 July 2002	Bruno Cheyrou	(France)	Lille	Liverpool	£3.7m
1 July 2002	Steve Baker	(England)	Middlesbrough	Scarborough	Free
1 July 2002	Jon Worsnop	(England)	Bradford City	Chester City	Free
1 July 2002	Matthew Robinson	(England)	Reading	Oxford United	Free
1 July 2002	Jamie Redknapp	(England)	Liverpool	Tottenham Hotspur	Free
1 July 2002	Alan Connell	(England)	Ipswich Town	Bournemouth	Free
1 July 2002	Delroy Facey	(England)	Huddersfield Town	Bolton Wanderers	Free
1 July 2002	Dean Gordon	(England)	Middlesbrough	Coventry City	Free
1 July 2002	Bülent Akın	(Turkey)	Galatasaray S.K.	Bolton Wanderers	Free
1 July 2002	Ívar Ingimarsson	(Iceland)	Brentford	Wolverhampton Wanderers	Free
1 July 2002	Ronnie Wallwork	(England)	Manchester United	West Bromwich Albion	Free
1 July 2002	Steve Yates	(England)	Tranmere Rovers	Sheffield United	Free
1 July 2002	David Smith	(England)	Grimsby Town	Swansea City	Free
2 July 2002	Dani Rodrigues	(Portugal)	Southampton	Walsall	Free
2 July 2002	Stuart McCall	(Scotland)	Bradford City	Sheffield United	Free
3 July 2002	Paul Heckingbottom	(England)	Darlington	Norwich City	Free
3 July 2002	Tyrone Mears	(England)	Manchester City	Preston North End	£200k
3 July 2002	Massimo Maccarone	(Italy)	Empoli	Middlesbrough	£8.15m
4 July 2002	Alex Manninger	(Austria)	Arsenal	Espanyol	£960k
4 July 2002	Lee Steele	(England)	Brighton & Hove Albion	Oxford United	Free
4 July 2002	James Coppinger	(England)	Newcastle United	Exeter City	Free
5 July 2002	Alessandro Zamperini	(Italy)	Portsmouth	Modena	Free
5 July 2002	Karl Colley	(England)	Newcastle United	Sheffield United	Free
5 July 2002	Tommy Johnson	(England)	Kilmarnock	Gillingham	Free
5 July 2002	Iffy Onuora	(Scotland)	Gillingham	Sheffield United	Free
5 July 2002	Danny Butterfield	(England)	Grimsby Town	Crystal Palace	Free
5 July 2002	Terry Cooke	(England)	Manchester City	Grimsby Town	Free
6 July 2002	Marc Bircham	(Canada)	Millwall	Queens Park Rangers	Free
6 July 2002	Jonathan Blondel	(Belgium)	Excelsior Mouscron	Tottenham Hotspur	Free
8 July 2002	Michael Boulding	(England)	Grimsby Town	Aston Villa	Free
8 July 2002	Aliou Cissé	(Senegal)	Montpellier	Birmingham City	£1.5m
8 July 2002	Samuele Dalla Bona	(Italy)	Chelsea	Milan	£1m
9 July 2002	Alou Diarra	(France)	Bayern Munich	Liverpool	Free
9 July 2002	Nick Culkin	(England)	Manchester United	Queens Park Rangers	Free
9 July 2002	Laurens ten Heuvel	(Netherlands)	Telstar	Sheffield United	Free
10 July 2002	Thomas Myhre	(Norway)	Beşiktaş	Sunderland	Free
10 July 2002	Danny Hay	(New Zealand)	Leeds United	Walsall	Free
11 July 2002	Steve Harkness	(England)	Sheffield Wednesday	Chester City	Free
11 July 2002	Eddie Youds	(England)	Charlton Athletic	Huddersfield Town	Free
11 July 2002	Pascal Cygan	(France)	Lille	Arsenal	£2.1m
12 July 2002	Paul Evans	(South Africa)	Huddersfield Town	Sheffield Wednesday	Free
12 July 2002	Titus Bramble	(England)	Ipswich Town	Newcastle United	£5m
13 July 2002	Ríkharður Daðason	(Iceland)	Stoke City	Lillestrøm	Free
12 July 2002	Sean Dyche	(England)	Millwall	Watford	Free
12 July 2002	Darren Bazeley	(England)	Wolverhampton Wanderers	Walsall	Free
12 July 2002	Trevor Tearney	(England)	Birmingham City	Forest Green Rovers	Free
13 July 2002	Rohan Ricketts	(England)	Arsenal	Tottenham Hotspur	Free
13 July 2002	Laurent D'Jaffo	(Benin)	Sheffield United	Aberdeen	Free
13 July 2002	Joe Murphy	(England)	Tranmere Rovers	West Bromwich Albion	Free
15 July 2002	Lee Harper	(England)	Walsall	Northampton Town	Free
16 July 2002	Gary Croft	(England)	Ipswich Town	Cardiff City	Free
16 July 2002	Ben Burgess	(Republic of Ireland)	Blackburn Rovers	Stockport County	£400k
16 July 2002	Kenny Cunningham	(Republic of Ireland)	Wimbledon	Birmingham City	Free
16 July 2002	Shane Nicholson	(England)	Sheffield United	Tranmere Rovers	Free
18 July 2002	Danny Sonner	(England)	Birmingham City	Walsall	Free
20 July 2002	Simon Grayson	(England)	Blackburn Rovers	Blackpool	Free
22 July 2002	Rio Ferdinand	(England)	Leeds United	Manchester United	£30m
23 July 2002	Denis Irwin	(Republic of Ireland)	Manchester United	Wolverhampton Wanderers	Free
23 July 2002	Paul Trollope	(England)	Coventry City	Northampton Town	Free
24 July 2002	Carl Robinson	(Wales)	Wolverhampton Wanderers	Portsmouth	Free
24 July 2002	Richard Wright	(England)	Arsenal	Everton	£3.5m
26 July 2002	Benito Carbone	(Italy)	Bradford City	Como	£800k
26 July 2002	Ulises de la Cruz	(Ecuador)	Hibernian	Aston Villa	£1.5m
26 July 2002	Dwight Yorke	(Trinidad and Tobago)	Manchester United	Blackburn Rovers	£2m
28 July 2002	Gilberto Silva	(Brazil)	Atlético Mineiro	Arsenal	£4.5m
29 July 2002	Gary Breen	(Republic of Ireland)	Coventry City	West Ham United	Free
30 July 2002	Chris Killen	(New Zealand)	Manchester City	Oldham Athletic	£200k
30 July 2002	Andy Johnson	(England)	Birmingham City	Crystal Palace	£750k
30 July 2002	Clinton Morrison	(Republic of Ireland)	Crystal Palace	Birmingham City	£4.25m
31 July 2002	Colin Larkin	(Republic of Ireland)	Wolverhampton Wanderers	Mansfield Town	£125k
31 July 2002	Arnar Gunnlaugsson	(Iceland)	Leicester City	Dundee United	Free
31 July 2002	Wayne Allison	(England)	Tranmere Rovers	Sheffield United	Free
1 August 2002	Stefani Miglioranzi	(Brazil)	Portsmouth	Swindon Town	Free
1 August 2002	Rodrigo	(Brazil)	Santos	Everton	£1.25m
1 August 2002	Filipe Oliveira	(Portugal)	Porto	Chelsea	£500k
1 August 2002	Brendan McGill	(England)	Sunderland	Carlisle United	Free
1 August 2002	Magnus Hedman	(Sweden)	Coventry City	Celtic	£1.5m
1 August 2002	Shaun Derry	(England)	Portsmouth	Crystal Palace	£400k
2 August 2002	Juninho Paulista	(Brazil)	Atlético Madrid	Middlesbrough	£6m
2 August 2002	Ian Brightwell	(England)	Stoke City	Port Vale	Free
2 August 2002	Ragnvald Soma	(Norway)	West Ham United	Bryne	Free
4 August 2002	Alan Kimble	(England)	Wimbledon	Luton Town	Free
4 August 2002	Tom Bennett	(England)	Walsall	Boston United	Free
4 August 2002	Don Goodman	(England)	Walsall	Exeter City	Free
5 August 2002	Sean Gregan	(England)	Preston North End	West Bromwich Albion	£1.5m
5 August 2002	George Boateng	(Netherlands)	Aston Villa	Middlesbrough	£5m
6 August 2002	Paul Merson	(England)	Aston Villa	Portsmouth	Free
6 August 2002	Salif Diao	(Senegal)	Sedan	Liverpool	£500k
8 August 2002	Nick Barmby	(England)	Liverpool	Leeds United	£2.75m
12 August 2002	Paul Okon	(Australia)	Middlesbrough	Leeds United	Free
13 August 2002	Lee Marshall	(England)	Leicester City	West Bromwich Albion	£700k
15 August 2002	Stephen Wright	(England)	Liverpool	Sunderland	£3m
17 August 2002	Dele Adebola	(Nigeria)	Birmingham City	Crystal Palace	Free
21 August 2002	Matt Piper	(England)	Leicester City	Sunderland	£3.5m
21 August 2002	Karim Kerkar	(Algeria)	Le Havre	Manchester City	Free
23 August 2002	Mark Kinsella	(Republic of Ireland)	Charlton Athletic	Aston Villa	£750k
23 August 2002	Antti Niemi	(Finland)	Hearts	Southampton	£2m
27 August 2002	Bo Hansen	(Denmark)	Bolton Wanderers	Midtjylland	Free
28 August 2002	Hakan Ünsal	(Turkey)	Galatasaray	Blackburn Rovers	Free
28 August 2002	Chris Armstrong	(Wales)	Tottenham Hotspur	Bolton Wanderers	Free
29 August 2002	Lee Hughes	(England)	Coventry City	West Bromwich Albion	£2.5m
29 August 2002	Gianluca Festa	(Italy)	Middlesbrough	Portsmouth	Free
29 August 2002	Ronny Johnsen	(Norway)	Manchester United	Aston Villa	Free
29 August 2002	Jason Koumas	(Wales)	Tranmere Rovers	West Bromwich Albion	£2.25m
29 August 2002	David Thompson	(England)	Coventry City	Blackburn Rovers	£1.5m
29 August 2002	Phil Stamp	(England)	Middlesbrough	Hearts	Free
30 August 2002	Rami Shaaban	(Sweden)	Djurgården	Arsenal	Free
30 August 2002	Øyvind Leonhardsen	(Norway)	Tottenham Hotspur	Aston Villa	Free
30 August 2002	Marcus Stewart	(England)	Ipswich Town	Sunderland	£3.25m
30 August 2002	Ricardo	(Spain)	Real Valladolid	Manchester United	£1.5m
30 August 2002	Tore André Flo	(Norway)	Rangers	Sunderland	£6.75m
30 August 2002	Jesper Blomqvist	(Sweden)	Everton	Charlton Athletic	Free
30 August 2002	Andrei Kanchelskis	(Russia)	Rangers	Southampton	Free
30 August 2002	Robbie Mustoe	(England)	Middlesbrough	Charlton Athletic	Free
30 August 2002	Jari Litmanen	(Finland)	Liverpool	Ajax	Free
31 August 2002	Robbie Keane	(Republic of Ireland)	Leeds United	Tottenham Hotspur	£7m
31 August 2002	David Holdsworth	(England)	Birmingham City	Bolton Wanderers	Free
31 August 2002	Idan Tal	(Israel)	Everton	Rayo Vallecano	Free

== Notes and references ==
- Transfers - May, 2002
- Transfers - June, 2002
- Transfers - July, 2002
- Transfers - August 2002

Specific
