= Tesfa Robinson =

English-born Kittitian footballer

Personal information
- Full name: Tesfa Tweede Robinson
- Date of birth: 7 December 1985 (age 40)
- Place of birth: Birmingham, England
- Height: 1.88 m (6 ft 2 in)
- Position: Defender

Youth career
- Birmingham City
- Cheltenham Town

Senior career*
| Years | Team | Apps | (Gls) |
| 2007 | Lakin Rangers | 4 | (0) |
| 2008 | Shawbury United | | |
| 2008–2009 | Oldbury Athletic | | |
| 2009–2010 | Rushall Olympic | | |
| 2010 | Romulus | | |
| 2011–2012 | Redditch United | | |
| 2012 | Evesham United | 11 | (0) |
| 2012–2014 | Chasetown | 59 | (3) |
| 2014 | Studley | 3 | (1) |
| 2014 | Halesowen Town | | |
| 2014–2015 | Stratford Town | 4 | (0) |
| 2015 | Bromsgrove Sporting | 1 | (0) |
| 2015–2025 | Sporting Khalsa | 309 | (29) |
| 2018–2019 | → Loughborough University (loan) | 0 | (0) |
| 2021–2022 | → OJM Black Country (loan) | 0 | (0) |
| Total | | 392 | (33) |

International career
| 2012–2015 | St. Kitts & Nevis | 10 | (0) |
- * Club domestic league appearances and goals

Tesfa Tweede Robinson (born 7 December 1985) is a Kittitian former footballer who played as a defender.

Robinson has represented the Saint Kitts and Nevis national football team on ten occasions, making his debut for the side in 2012.

== Club career ==
=== Early career ===
Born in Birmingham, Robinson played for the academies of professional clubs Birmingham City (despite being a supporter of their rivals, Aston Villa,) and Cheltenham Town as a youngster, but failed to progress to either team's senior side. Instead, Robinson began his senior career at local Birmingham & District amateur club Lakin Rangers FC in 2007. The defender made his debut in a 3–2 win over Boldmere Falcons on 1 September 2007; he went on to make a total of five appearances for Lakin in all competitions. Robinson's last game for Lakin came in the 4–1 cup defeat to Handsworth on 13 October 2007.

Robinson took in a short spell at Shropshire club Shawbury United before joining Oldbury Athletic for the 2008–09 season, which would ultimately be the club's penultimate campaign in existence. Oldbury finished fourth in the Midland Combination Premier Division in Robinson's only season at the club.

Northern Premier League Division One South club Rushall Olympic signed Robinson on a free transfer on 5 August 2009 after he played in three friendly fixtures; he was one of 18 summer signings as coaches Neil Kitching and Martin Sockett revamped Rushall's playing squad. Robinson's first official appearance for the club came in a 2–1 defeat of Glapwell on 15 August 2009; his first Pics goal arrived two weeks later in a 2–0 FA Cup preliminary round win over Brocton on 29 August. He was sent-off in a 5–0 win over Goole on 19 September 2009 for fouling Gavin Allott as the last man back. Robinson had to wait until 5 December 2009 for his next goal, scoring a last-minute headed winner in Rushall's 2–1 win at Chasetown. On 18 May 2010 Robinson played in Rushall's 1–0 loss to Bloxwich United in the final of the Walsall Senior Cup. Robinson was one of four players to leave the club at the end of the season.

=== 2010–2025 ===
In August 2010 Robinson signed for Northern Premier League Division One South side Romulus; he made his debut for the club in a 3–3 draw with Quorn on 24 August. His second appearance for Romulus came in an FA Cup qualifier against former club Rushall Olympic on 28 August, but the defender suffered an injury soon afterwards and was on the sidelines for three weeks. Robinson's first game following his return to first-team action again pitted him against Rushall, this time in the President's Cup in a 4–1 defeat on 21 September in which he conceded a penalty.

In August 2011 Robinson joined Redditch United of the Southern League Premier Division. He was voted man of the match in Redditch's 3–0 win over Halesowen Town in a pre-season friendly on 7 August; his first competitive appearance for the club came in a 2–0 defeat of Bedford Town 10 days later. Robinson scored his first goal for the club in a 3–2 victory over Frome Town on 26 September 2011. After establishing himself as a regular in Redditch's starting line-up in the first half of the season, Robinson was one of three players to be awarded a playing contract in October 2011; the move represented the club's "first signing in several years". Soon afterwards, on 26 November 2011, Robinson captained Redditch for the first and only time in a 1–0 loss to Arlesey Town.

In December 2011 Robinson visited children and staff at the Alexandra Hospital in Redditch along with club teammate and compatriot Aaron Moses-Garvey. The defender was injured during Redditch's warm-up prior to their 1–0 loss to Evesham on 31 December, and didn't return to first-team action until late January. Robinson left the club at the end of the 2011–12 season in April due to his contract expiring; his last appearance in a Redditch shirt came in a 2–0 defeat of Weymouth on 28 April 2012. With incoming assistant manager Asa Charlton likely to become the club's first-choice left-back, Robinson opted to drop a division and move to Evesham United rather than staying on at Redditch.

Robinson was immediately made club captain upon joining Evesham, despite suffering a calf problem in pre-season. His competitive debut for the club came in a 1–0 win over Sholing on 18 August; he went on to make eleven league appearances and thirteen appearances in all competitions for Evesham. In early November, just four months after joining the club, Robinson transferred to Chasetown of the Northern Premier League Division One South.

Although he was an unused substitute in Chasetown's 2–2 draw at Sheffield FC on 10 November 2012, Robinson had to wait until 24 November for his first league appearance for his new club, a 2–0 win over Rainworth Miners Welfare. Robinson scored a late equaliser – his first goal for Chasetown – to earn "The Scholars" a 1–1 draw at Halesowen Town on 1 January 2013. The centre-back's second Chasetown goal arrived on 9 March, when he netted a free-kick in a 3–0 win over Rainworth Miners Welfare. Robinson's "impressive form", in the words of Lichfield Live, helped Chasetown to the Division One South play-off final, where they lost 2–1 to Stamford. Despite having not been at the club for the first three months of the season, Robinson won both the Supporters' Player of the Season and the President's First Team Award at the club's presentations evening in May 2013.

On 25 September 2014, Robinson joined Halesowen Town. His stay was a short one, however, as by February 2015 he was playing for Sporting Khalsa of the West Midlands (Regional) League.

He spent ten years with Sporting Khalsa and he won the 2014–15 West Midlands (Regional) League, 2015–16 Staffordshire Senior Cup, and the 2020–21 Midland Football League Premier Division. Robinson also had two loans with Loughborough University and OJM Black Country but he made no appearances for either club, and he retired on 29 April 2025 after scoring 29 goals in 309 league appearances for Sporting Khalsa.

== International career ==
Robinson was called up to the St Kitts and Nevis national team for the first time in October 2012 for the country's 2012 Caribbean Cup qualifiers as one of several England-based players to be selected. The defender made his international debut on 11 October in a 2–0 win over Anguilla; he made further appearances in the defeats to Trinidad and Tobago and French Guiana before St Kitts and Nevis were eliminated from the qualification process on 15 October.

== Career statistics ==
=== International ===
Appearances and goals by national team and year
| National team | Year | Apps | Goals |
|---|---|---|---|
| Saint Kitts and Nevis | 2012 | 3 | 0 |
| Saint Kitts and Nevis | 2013 | 0 | 0 |
| Saint Kitts and Nevis | 2014 | 6 | 0 |
| Saint Kitts and Nevis | 2015 | 1 | 0 |
| Total | | 10 | 0 |
