= Nick Liversedge =

English Footballer

Personal information
- Full name: Nicholas James Liversedge
- Date of birth: 18 July 1988 (age 38)
- Place of birth: Hull, England
- Height: 6 ft 4 in (1.93 m)
- Position: Goalkeeper

Youth career
- ?–2007: Rotherham United

Senior career*
Years	Team	Apps	(Gls)
2007–2010	Darlington	13	(0)
2008–2009	→ Whitby Town (loan)	29	(0)
2010–2011	Whitby Town	12	(0)
2011	Jarrow Roofing	?	(?)
2011–2013	Whitby Town	59	(0)
2013–2014	Burnley	0	(0)
2013	→ Hyde (loan)	3	(0)
2014–2016	Guisborough Town	?	(?)
2016–2018	Shildon		
2018–2023	Bishop Auckland		
2023–2025	West Auckland Town		
Total		106+	(0)
- * Club domestic league appearances and goals as of 18:37, 15 January 2025 (UTC)

Nicholas James Liversedge (born 18 July 1988) is an English former footballer who played as a goalkeeper.

== Career ==
=== Non-League career ===
Born in Hull, Liversedge joined Darlington in November 2007, after progressing through Rotherham United's Centre of Excellence. He spent the 2008–09 season on loan to Whitby Town, making 30 appearances for the non-League club. He made his senior debut on 6 October 2009 against Leeds United in a Football League Trophy game but the game ended on a sour note when he was sent off for bringing down Leeds United player Enoch Showunmi.

He was released by the club following their relegation from League 2, along with 13 other players. Liversedge was announced as a Whitby Town player at the club's AGM on Friday 25 June 2010 by club chairman Graham Manser after a successful loan spell in the 2008–2009 season

On 30 April 2012 Liversedge played as a trialist for Burnley reserves in a 3–1 over Tranmere.

=== Burnley ===
On 10 May 2013, over a year since his first trial for Burnley reserves, it was confirmed that Liversedge would join the Championship side on a free transfer after the Lancashire Club released both Brian Jensen and Lee Grant at the end of the 2012–13 season.

==== Loan to Hyde ====
On 20 September 2013, Liversedge joined Conference Premier side Hyde on a one-month loan deal, to cover for Hyde's injured first choice goalkeeper David Carnell. He made his Hyde debut just a day later in a 1–0 defeat to Welling United at Ewen Fields.

=== Return to non-league ===
At the end of the 2013–14 season, Liversedge was released by Burnley following their promotion to the Premier League, having never made a first team appearance for the club. He subsequently joined Northern Football League Division One side Guisborough Town on a free transfer. He joined Shildon in the 2016 closed season. in 2018, he joined Bishop Auckland on free transfer, Liversedge has become a fan favourite of the club, in his first season he helped the club to 3rd, despite picking up a groin injury towards the end of the season, in the first half of defeat away to Sunderland RCA. Liversedge signed a new deal for the 2020–21 season, Liversedge injured his groin in a defeat in the FA Vase, This was the final straw in Managers Ian Chandler's time at Bishop, Liversedge sat out 4 games as young backup Keeper Charlie Lamb provide cover for Liversedge, Liversedge returned to the starting 11 in the first game under Andy Toman, a defeat to local rivals and former club Shildon. in April 2021 Liversedge committed Bishops by signing another 1-year deal at the club, keeping him at the club for a 4th season. In 2022, as Bishop's just stayed up Liversedge being a key part in that, he signed a 2-year deal to stay at the club for another 2 years, In July 2022 he was appointed club captain.

On 14 January 2025, West Auckland Town announced that Liversedge would depart the club following his retirement from football.

== Career statistics ==
As of match played 20 September 2013.

Club statistics
Club	Season	League			FA Cup		League Cup		Other		Total	
Club	Season	Division	Apps	Goals	Apps	Goals	Apps	Goals	Apps	Goals	Apps	Goals
Darlington	2009–10	League Two	13	0	1	0	0	0	1 (Note: Appearance(s) in Football League Trophy)	0	15	0
Whitby Town (loan)	2008–09	NPL Premier Division	29	0	0	0	—		5 (Note: 3 appearances in FA Trophy, 2 appearances in Northern Premier League Challenge Cup)	0	34	0
Whitby Town	2010–11	NPL Premier Division	12	0	0	0	—		5 (Note: 4 appearances in FA Trophy, 1 appearance in Northern Premier League Challenge Cup)	0	17	0
Whitby Town	2011–12	NPL Premier Division	19	0	0	0	—		0	0	19	0
Whitby Town	2012–13	NPL Premier Division	40	0	4	0	—		4 (Note: 3 appearances in FA Trophy, 1 appearance in Northern Premier League Challenge Cup)	0	48	0
Whitby Town	Total		100	0	4	0	—		14	0	118	0
Hyde (loan)	2013–14	Conference Premier	3	0	0	0	—		0	0	3	0
Career totals			116	0	5	0	0	0	15	0	136	0
