= David Dowson =

English footballer (born 1988)

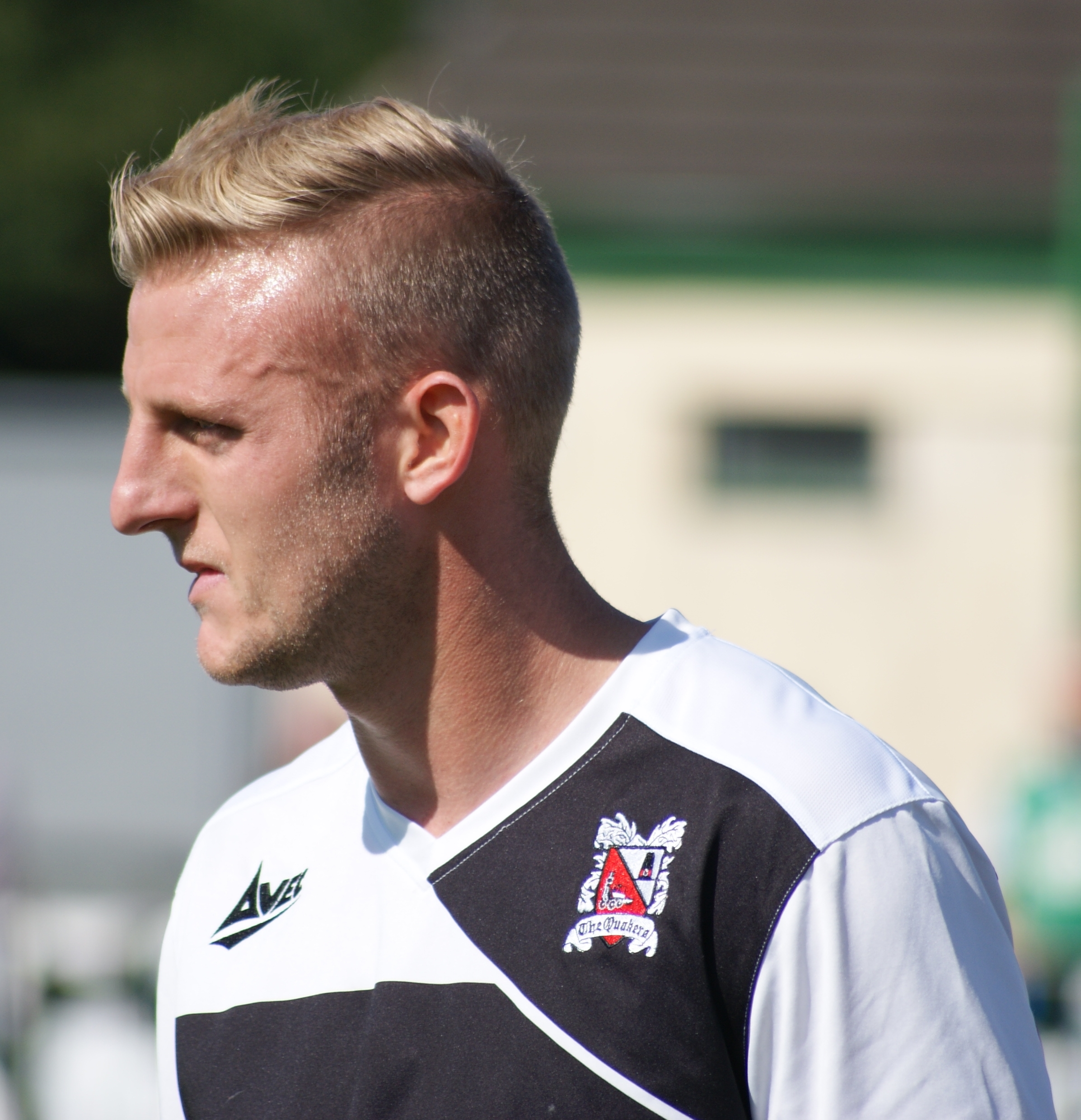
- Dowson playing for Darlington 1883 in 2014

Personal information
- Full name: David Dowson
- Date of birth: 12 September 1988 (age 38)
- Place of birth: Bishop Auckland, England
- Height: 5 ft 10 in (1.78 m)
- Position: Striker

Team information
- Current team: Spennymoor Town

Youth career
- –2007: Sunderland

Senior career*
Years	Team	Apps	(Gls)
2007–2010	Sunderland	0	(0)
2008	→ Chesterfield (loan)	12	(3)
2009	→ Darlington (loan)	10	(1)
2010	Gateshead	0	(0)
2010	York City	5	(0)
2010–2012	Durham City		
2012–2016	Darlington 1883		
2016–	Spennymoor Town		
- * Club domestic league appearances and goals as of 22:49, 17 April 2016 (UTC)

David Dowson (born 12 September 1988) is an English semi-professional footballer who plays as a striker for National League North club Spennymoor Town.

== Career ==
Born in Bishop Auckland, County Durham, Dowson started his career with Sunderland's youth system, and signed a professional contract on 12 June 2007. He made his first-team debut while on loan at Chesterfield on 23 February 2008 against Brentford, also scoring a goal. His loan, initially for one month, was later extended to the rest of the season. After his debut, he went a spree of several games without scoring a goal until he netted two goals in a 4–1 victory over Shrewsbury Town on 5 April 2008. Dowson spent most of 2009–10 on loan at Darlington, scoring one goal in 12 appearances.

Dowson signed for Conference Premier club Gateshead on 18 July 2010 on non-contract terms, but was released on 10 August 2010. He had a trial with Conference Premier team York City in September 2010 and played in a 1–1 draw against former club Chesterfield in the reserve team. He signed for the club on a short-term contract on 25 September 2010 and made his debut later that day as an 85th-minute substitute in a 3–1 away victory over Tamworth. Having made five appearances for York he was released by new manager Gary Mills on 22 October 2010.

Dowson signed for Northern Premier League Division One North side Durham City and scored on his debut against Leigh Genesis in a 3–1 win. On 13 June 2012, Dowson signed for Darlington, but on 25 June, his registration was changed to the new Darlington 1883 club following the liquidation of the original club. Having played irregularly for Darlington 1883 in 2015–16, Dowson joined Northern Premier League Division One North club Spennymoor Town on 10 February 2016.

== Career statistics ==
As of match played 9 October 2010.

Appearances and goals by club, season and competition
Club	Season	League			FA Cup		League Cup		Other		Total	
Club	Season	Division	Apps	Goals	Apps	Goals	Apps	Goals	Apps	Goals	Apps	Goals
Sunderland	2007–08	Premier League	0	0	0	0	0	0	—		0	0
Sunderland	2008–09	Premier League	0	0	0	0	0	0	—		0	0
Sunderland	2009–10	Premier League	0	0	0	0	—		—		0	0
Sunderland	Total		0	0	0	0	0	0	—		0	0
Chesterfield (loan)	2007–08	League Two	12	3	—		—		—		12	3
Darlington (loan)	2009–10	League Two	10	1	0	0	1	0	1 (Note: Appearance in Football League Trophy)	0	12	1
Gateshead	2010–11	Conference Premier	0	0	—		—		—		0	0
York City	2010–11	Conference Premier	5	0	—		—		—		5	0
Career total			27	4	0	0	1	0	1	0	29	4
