= Dion Scott (English footballer) =

English footballer (born 1980)

Personal information
- Full name: Dion Elijah Scott
- Date of birth: 24 December 1980 (age 45)
- Place of birth: Bearwood, England
- Height: 5 ft 11 in (1.80 m)
- Position: Defender

Youth career
- –1998: Walsall

Senior career*
| Years | Team | Apps | (Gls) |
| 1998–2002 | Walsall | 2 | (0) |
| 2001 | → Boston United (loan) | 4 | (0) |
| 2001–2002 | → Boston United (loan) | 3 | (1) |
| 2002–2003 | Mansfield Town | 0 | (0) |
| 2003 | Kidderminster Harriers | 19 | (1) |
| 2003–2004 | Nuneaton Borough | 22 | (0) |
| 2004–200? | AFC Telford United | | |
| 2005–200? | Tividale | | |
| 200?–2008 | Oldbury Athletic | | |
| 2008 | Sutton Coldfield Town | | |
| 2008–2009 | Oldbury Athletic | | |
| 2009–2010 | Cradley Town | | |
| 2010 | Bromsgrove Rovers | 0 | (0) |
- * Club domestic league appearances and goals

Dion Elijah Scott (born 24 December 1980) is an English footballer who played in the Football League for Walsall and Kidderminster Harriers. A central defender, he was also on the books of Mansfield Town, where injury prevented his playing for them in the League, and appeared in non-league football for teams including Boston United (in two spells), Nuneaton Borough, AFC Telford United, Tividale, Oldbury Athletic (two spells), Sutton Coldfield Town, Oldbury Athletic and Bromsgrove Rovers.

== Early life and career ==
Scott was born in Bearwood, West Midlands. He is the older brother of footballer David Davis. Scott attended Perryfields Comprehensive School in Oldbury, and played representative football for Warley Schools. He joined Walsall as a trainee, and in the 1998–99 season, he captained Walsall's youth team on a run to the fourth round of the FA Youth Cup, in which they eliminated Tottenham Hotspur's youngsters on penalties after a replay, before going out to the eventual Cup-winners, a West Ham United side that included six under-age internationals, one of whom, Joe Cole, had already made his Premier League debut. At the end of that season, Walsall's first team were promoted to the First Division, and Scott turned professional.

== Football League career ==
=== Walsall ===
Scott was included among the substitutes for the First Division visit to Blackburn Rovers in September 1999. He remained unused, and did not make his first-team debut until the following season, after Walsall's relegation to the Second Division. On 30 January 2001, Scott started in the Football League Trophy match at home to Wigan Athletic and put up what the Evening Mail dubbed "an encouraging display" in the 2–1 win, but in the next round, he was "out of his depth" in a 4–0 defeat away to Stoke City. Scott made his first appearance in the Football League on 5 May away to Northampton Town. Graydon had rested several players ahead of the play-offs, and starting centre-back Ian Roper struggled so badly against Lee Howey and the windy conditions that Scott replaced him after 21 minutes; Walsall won the match 3–0. With established centre half Ian Brightwell doubtful for the October 2001 visit to Sheffield Wednesday, it was between Scott and Roper to replace him; Roper started, and Scott came on in the 89th minute to make his only appearance in the First Division.

Scott joined Boston United of the Football Conference on 2 November 2001 on loan for a month. He started four matches – the Lincolnshire Echo described how he "crowned a fine debut with an heroic goal-line clearance after Whitehall had skipped round Bastock, fired towards a gaping net and seemed an almost certain scorer" – before being recalled because of an injury crisis at Walsall. His services were not used, and after recovering from influenza he returned to Boston for another month. His first senior goal opened the scoring in a 6–1 win against Forest Green Rovers, and on an icy New Year's Day, he and three team-mates were involved in a car accident on the way to that day's match. Two players were unable to take the field; Scott did so, but the match was abandoned just before half-time because the pitch was unplayable. He made three more appearances before returning to Walsall.

=== Mansfield Town ===
Since turning professional, Scott had played regularly for Walsall's reserves but had failed to force his way into the first team. New manager Colin Lee prioritised adding experience to the defence, so in April 2002, Scott signed for Second Division club Mansfield Town on a free transfer. A shoulder injury prevented him from playing, and new manager Keith Curle released him in January 2003.

=== Kidderminster Harriers ===
After a trial, Scott joined Third Division club Kidderminster Harriers on non-contract terms. He began well defensively, and on 11 February scored his first and what would prove only Football League goal, an 83rd-minute headed equaliser away to Carlisle United. His short-term deal was renewed in March, and he was hopeful that a longer deal might be forthcoming if he continued to impress with his "no-nonsense" defensive style: he described himself as "not the most talented footballer you will every see but I can head and clear the ball away, that's what I'm best at. I leave the skilful stuff to the lads around me!" However, mistakes crept in, Harriers dropped out of the play-off places, and in light of the club's financial issues, Scott was let go.

== Non-League career ==
Scott joined Nuneaton Borough of the Southern League Premier Division on a two-year contract ahead of the 2003–04 season, but an Achilles injury meant he was unable to make his debut until mid-November. He made 22 league starts, but was transfer-listed at the end of the season because new manager Roger Ashby thought his performances did not justify his high wages. His contract was cancelled and he signed for Northern Premier League Division One club AFC Telford United, but a pre-season shin injury kept him out for months.

His later clubs included Tividale of the West Midlands (Regional) League Premier Division, Oldbury Athletic of Midland Combination Division One, a short spell in the Southern League Midlands Division with Sutton Coldfield Town before returning to Oldbury in the Midland Combination Premier Division, then Cradley Town, and he was on the books of Bromsgrove Rovers ahead of the 2010–11 season before that club folded.
