= David Davis (footballer) =

English footballer

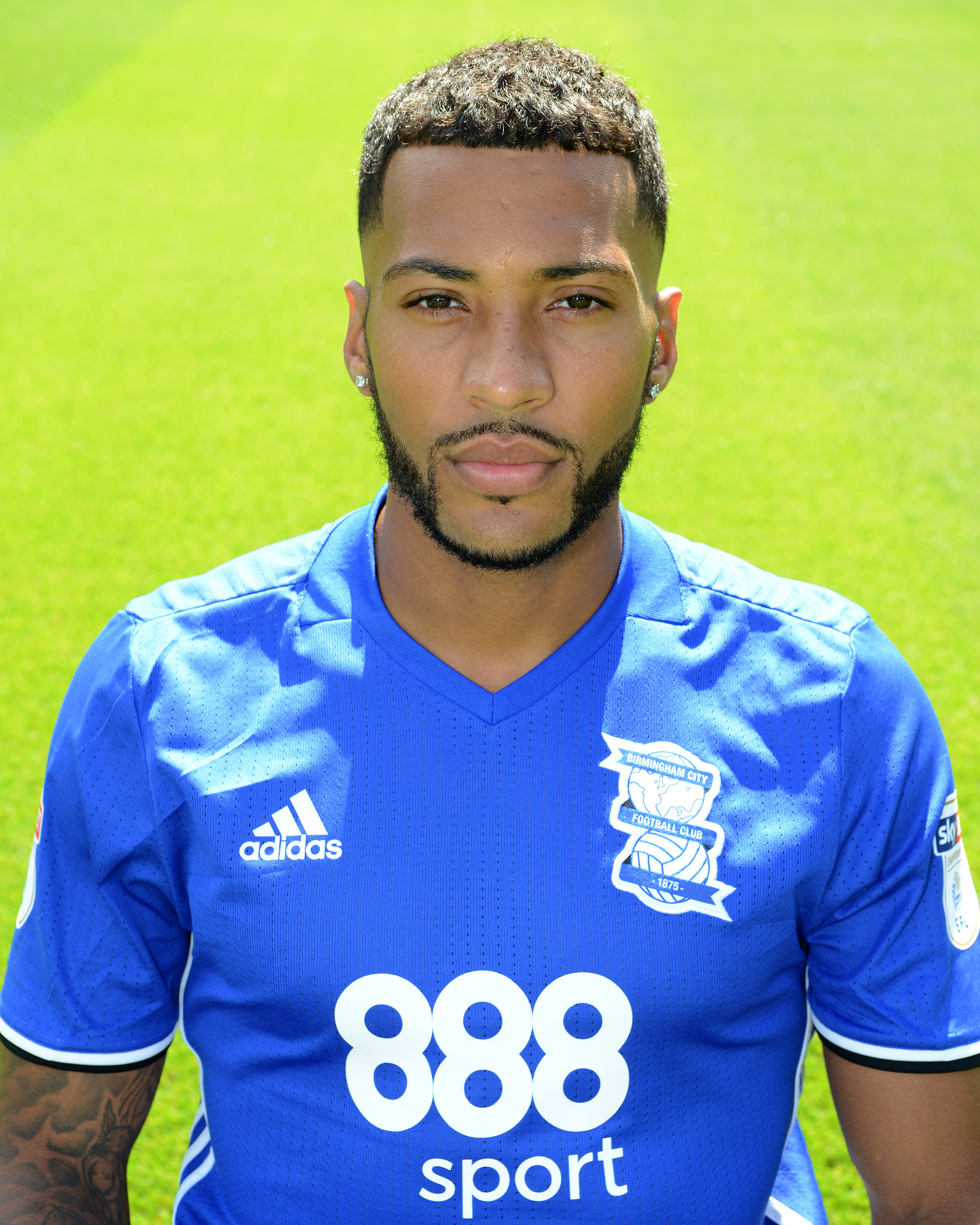
- Davis with Birmingham City in 2016

Personal information
- Full name: David Lowell Davis
- Date of birth: 20 February 1991 (age 35)
- Place of birth: Smethwick, England
- Height: 5 ft 9 in (1.75 m)
- Position: Midfielder

Team information
- Current team: Kidderminster Harriers
- Number: 26

Youth career
- –2007: Walsall
- 2007–2008: Tividale
- 2008–2009: Wolverhampton Wanderers

Senior career*
Years	Team	Apps	(Gls)
2009–2014	Wolverhampton Wanderers	53	(0)
2009	→ Darlington (loan)	5	(0)
2010	→ Walsall (loan)	7	(0)
2011	→ Shrewsbury Town (loan)	19	(2)
2011–2012	→ Inverness Caledonian Thistle (loan)	14	(1)
2012	→ Chesterfield (loan)	9	(0)
2014–2021	Birmingham City	182	(10)
2020	→ Charlton Athletic (loan)	5	(0)
2021–2022	Shrewsbury Town	48	(1)
2022–2024	Forest Green Rovers	12	(0)
2023	→ Solihull Moors (loan)	2	(0)
2024–	Kidderminster Harriers	37	(1)
- * Club domestic league appearances and goals as of 11:51, 16 April 2025 (UTC)

David Lowell Davis (born 20 February 1991) is an English professional footballer who plays as a midfielder for National League club Kidderminster Harriers.

Having trained with Walsall's Centre of Excellence as a boy, and then played local football for Tividale, Davis began a scholarship in Wolverhampton Wanderers' youth academy in 2007. He turned professional in 2009, and made his senior debut the same year while on loan to Darlington of League Two. He spent time on loan at three other clubs in the lower leagues – Walsall and Chesterfield of League One and League Two Shrewsbury Town – as well as at Scottish Premier League side Inverness Caledonian Thistle, before making seven appearances for Wolves in the Premier League at the end of the 2011–12 season during their unsuccessful fight against relegation. Although playing fairly regularly in the Championship, he never established himself as a consistent member of the starting eleven as Wolves were again relegated. He fell out of favour the following season, and left for West Midlands neighbours Birmingham City in August 2014. He spent six and a half years with the club, during which he made nearly 200 appearances in all competitions and was voted Birmingham's Player of the Year for 2016–17 before falling out of favour and spending time on loan at Charlton Athletic. He was released by mutual consent in January 2021 and joined Shrewsbury Town. After 18 months, he was released and signed for Forest Green Rovers.

== Early life and career ==
Davis was born in Smethwick, Sandwell. His older brother, Dion Scott, played as a defender in the Football League for Walsall and Kidderminster Harriers.

Davis spent time in Walsall's Centre of Excellence as a boy, and then played local youth football for Tividale. Spotted by Wolverhampton Wanderers as a 15-year-old, he had trials with the club and was given "a year to try and impress" before beginning a two-year scholarship in 2007. According to his first-year academy profile, he was a midfielder who "shows good versatility and all round game" and was "adept in possession." In 2009, Davis was one of seven academy players to sign professional contracts.

== Senior career ==
=== First-team football on loan ===
Davis joined League Two club Darlington on 22 October 2009 on a month's loan (later extended to January 2010) to gain experience of first-team football. According to manager Steve Staunton, who had watched him play against Arsenal Reserves, "he's combative, he's excellent on the ball, he's strong and he's a good passer". He made his senior debut in the starting eleven at Barnet two days later; the Northern Echo reported that he "showed some promise" but "wasted a great scoring chance" when he beat the offside trap only for his lobbed shot to go over the bar. In a 5–2 defeat at Chesterfield, he was used as the defensive organiser in a five-man midfield: the Echo's reporter described how he "sat in front of the back four and barked out orders" but thought his passing "left a lot to be desired". After a 4–0 home defeat by Morecambe, Davis was one of five players left out. He remained out of the side for three matches, then bad weather left Darlington without a match for several weeks, so he returned to his parent club. He had played five league matches and once in the FA Cup.

In September 2010 he went out on another month's loan, this time to League One club Walsall, where he had spent time as a junior. The Birmingham Mail reported that on his debut, in a defeat at Rochdale, he had "a quiet first half but showed some impressive touches in the second period and fitted well into Walsall's 4–3–3 formation." His captain, Darren Byfield, "thought David was superb. Usually when you have players who love to tackle and get in your face, they can't use the ball – but he was playing balls around the corners and off the strikers. You can see already he's not one of those who come from the Premiership thinking 'what am I doing here?' He's listening to people and his attitude is superb." He played the whole of Walsall's six matches during his initial month, apart from the last 15 minutes against Swindon Town when he was stretchered off with an injured ankle. The first five of those six – four losses and a draw – saw Walsall drop from 13th place to bottom of the table, and, again according to the Mail, Davis "did as well as can be expected from a 19-year-old pitched into a team in freefall". The loan was extended for another month, but because Wolves had injury problems, manager Mick McCarthy included a clause allowing them to recall him at 24 hours notice if they needed him. Davis played just once more for Walsall before he was recalled. With three first-team midfielders unavailable, McCarthy included him on the bench for Wolves' Premier League visit to Chelsea; he remained unused.

After more appearances on the first-team bench, and a sending-off for a "reckless challenge" in a reserve-team local derby against West Bromwich Albion, Davis signed for League Two Shrewsbury Town on 31 January 2011 on loan for a month, later extended to the end of the campaign. He went straight into the starting eleven and "combined a crispness in the tackle with an impressive range of passing" in what the Shropshire Star called "a highly intelligent display" as Shrewsbury beat Burton Albion 3–0. He "rifled home a first time shot from just inside the box" for his first senior goal to equalise away to Northampton Town on 5 March; Shrewsbury won 3–2. In all, Davis made 19 league appearances, all as a member of the starting eleven, and scored twice. His second goal, on the final day of the regular season contributed to a 3–0 defeat of Oxford United, but Wycombe Wanderers' win meant Shrewsbury missed out on automatic promotion and went into the play-offs instead. Davis played in both legs of the semi-final, in which his team lost on aggregate to Torquay United.

=== Wolves debut and more loans ===
During his time with Shrewsbury, Davis extended his contract with Wolves until 2013. He made his debut for the club in the League Cup second-round tie away to Northampton Town on 23 August 2011, coming off the bench for the last few minutes as Wolves won 4–0. A week later, he made yet another loan move, this time to Scottish Premier League (SPL) side Inverness Caledonian Thistle until January 2012.

Ahead of his debut, he said he felt the intensity of the training sessions had improved his fitness, and while admitting that the standard of the SPL would be rather higher than he was used to, he hoped to prove himself ready and able to play regularly. He started the match against Hearts on 10 September, a 1–1 draw in which he played 65 minutes, received a standing ovation, and was the Scottish Express reporter's "calm and creative" man of the match. He made 14 appearances in the SPL, all starts, and scored once, with a curling shot from 20 yards (18 m) after three minutes of the 3–2 home defeat against Motherwell. He also experienced his first senior sending-off; after his "surging run" and cross set up a second-minute goal for Jonny Hayes against Dundee United, he was yellow-carded for a tackle on Gary Mackay-Steven that caused a collision in which Davis's teammate Chris Hogg suffered serious knee damage. Another foul on Mackay-Steven in the 83rd minute earned Davis a second yellow card.

Manager Terry Butcher had hoped to keep Davis and two other loanees for the whole season, because they had all performed well and he had no budget to add to the squad, but the player chose to return to England where he could go on loan somewhere closer to his parent club. According to Butcher, Mick McCarthy "felt David had gone away a boy and returned a man, as regular SPL action had developed him physically and improved his match awareness."

A few days after his spell at Inverness ended, Davis joined League One side Chesterfield on loan for three months. He was ever-present over nine league matches and also played twice in the Football League Trophy, a cup competition open to teams from the third and fourth tiers of the Football League; a 3–1 aggregate win against Oldham Athletic in the Northern Final earned Chesterfield a place in the final itself. On 6 March, he was recalled by Wolves' new manager, Terry Connor, after an injury to Karl Henry left Wolves in need of midfield cover. Davis himself felt that the possibility of playing Premier League football for Wolves far outweighed the prospect of a Wembley final.

=== First-team football with Wolves ===
Davis made his Premier League debut in Wolves' 2–0 defeat to Blackburn Rovers on 10 March 2012. He played 75 minutes before coming off with cramp, and produced a "courageous performance" that earned him the club's man-of-the-match award. He kept his place for the next match, against Manchester United, broke a rib in the first half, but still went on to make seven top-flight appearances as the team unsuccessfully battled relegation. Towards the end of the season, and despite having signed a new deal less than a year earlier, Davis signed a three-year contract to run until 2015. In recognition of his performances, he received the club's Young Professional of the Season award.

When Davis and other youngsters signed new deals in 2011, McCarthy had said they stood less chance of first-team football in the Premier League than when the team were playing in the Championship. A year later and back in the Championship, Davis was in the team at the beginning of the season, but lost form and returned to the reserves. By November, he was again challenging for a first-team place, and manager Ståle Solbakken turned down the chance to re-sign Arsenal midfielder Emmanuel Frimpong, still regaining fitness after serious injury, preferring to let the home-grown product prove himself. Davis featured regularly, but more often from the bench than in the starting eleven.

Dean Saunders, appointed in January 2013 as Wolves' fourth manager in twelve months, brought Davis into the starting eleven as a holding midfielder alongside Karl Henry for two matches. Those were his last starts until 16 March, when he returned against Bristol City, only to give the opposition the lead when his backpass went through the legs of goalkeeper Carl Ikeme. Wolves finished as 2–1 winners, but Ikeme was unable to play the second half after punching the tactics board in the dressing-room at half-time and breaking his hand. Two weeks later, he "produced arguably his best display yet in a Wolves shirt" when involved in all three goals in a 3–2 win away to Birmingham City that took his side out of the relegation positions. His season was cut short when he suffered an ankle injury against Bolton Wanderers on 6 April which ruled him out for the rest of the campaign, which ended in the club being relegated to League One.

Davis began the 2013–14 season in the starting eleven under yet another new manager, Kenny Jackett, but soon lost his place amid competition from new signing Kevin McDonald and two younger midfielders, Lee Evans and Jack Price. On his last start for Wolves, on 16 November, he was reportedly fortunate not to be sent off before being substituted at half-time. Thereafter he played only 54 minutes of first-team football as the team were promoted back to the Championship at the first attempt, and although Jackett insisted that he still had a future at the club, Davis became frustrated. Ahead of the new season, Jackett suggested that, as there were at least four players more likely than Davis to be selected, a loan move would be best for him. Barnsley of League One were interested, but terms could not be agreed.

=== Birmingham City ===
On 11 August 2014, Davis moved to West Midlands neighbours Birmingham City of the Championship. Viewed as a replacement for Tom Adeyemi, who had just left for Cardiff City, Davis signed a two-year deal with the option of a further year. The fee was officially undisclosed, but was variously reported as approaching or around £100,000 or as "a knockdown £150,000". He made an "outstanding" debut the next day in the first-round League Cup win against Cambridge United, partnering captain Paul Caddis in central midfield, and scored his first goal, a second-half equaliser away to Charlton Athletic on 4 October, with a "crisp drive inside the post from a tight angle".

Regular football improved his confidence and with it his effectiveness. Under Lee Clark, he started regularly but was often substituted; under Gary Rowett, who replaced Clark in late October, he played every minute of Birmingham's league fixtures, usually partnering Stephen Gleeson in a 4–2–3–1 formation, until injuring a knee in mid-February. He missed the 4–3 defeat at Brighton & Hove Albion, in which the local newspaper attributed Birmingham's defensive frailties to his absence. On his return, away at Ipswich Town, his presence achieved more in attack than defence, twice – with a header and then with a volley – restoring Birmingham to only one goal behind before Ipswich secured a 4–2 win in stoppage time. Rowett signed Nottingham Forest midfielder Robert Tesche on loan on 2 March. Initially he played alongside Davis in place of the suspended Gleeson, and then as part of a three-man midfield, but when Rowett reverted to 4–2–3–1, it was Davis who missed out.

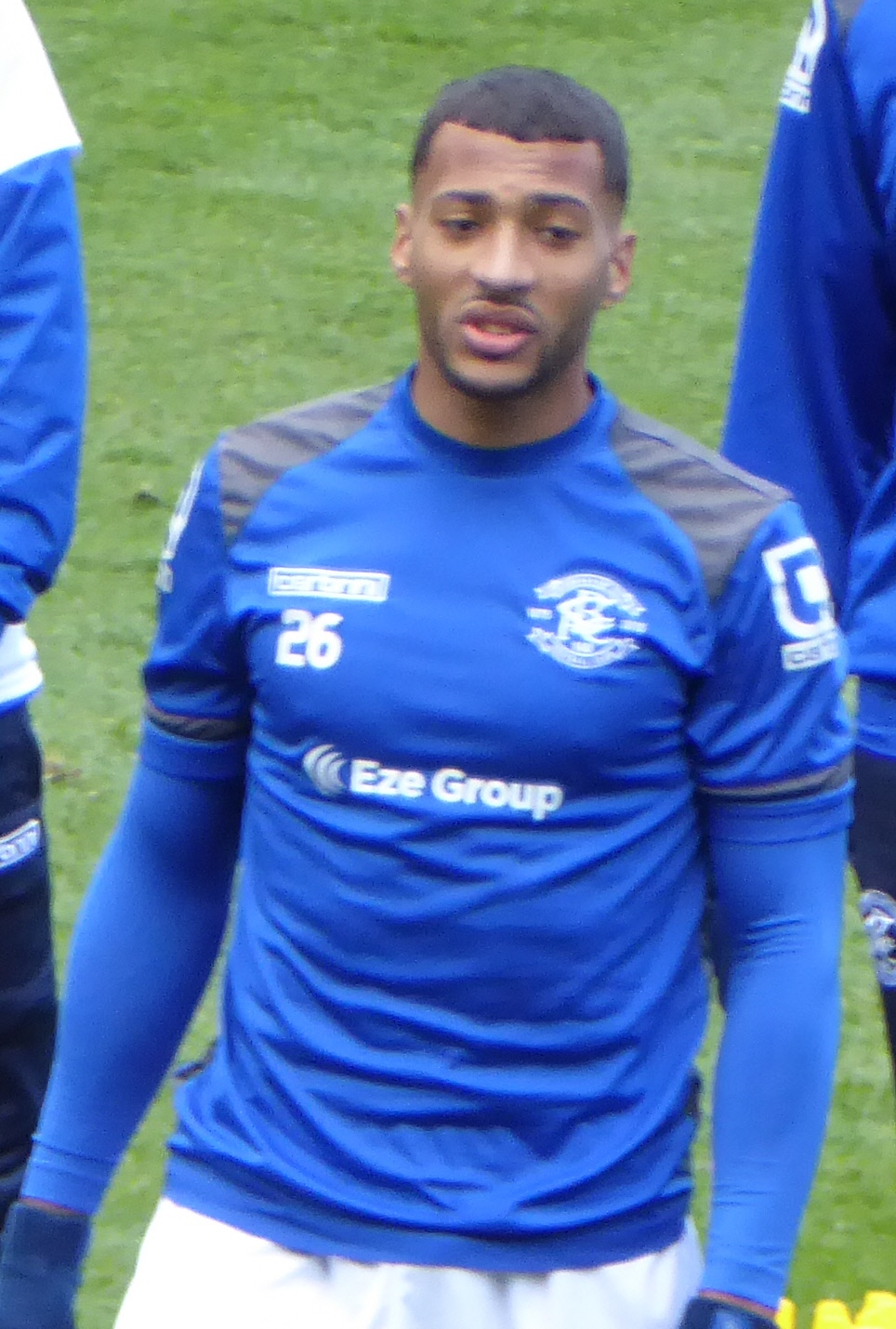
Davis with Birmingham City in April 2016

According to the Birmingham Mail's end-of-season review, "for most of the season no other midfielder could challenge [Davis] in terms of energy, tackles, clearances or blocks", and he was a close second to 16-goal striker Clayton Donaldson as their player of the season. Nevertheless, he lost his starting spot to new signing Maikel Kieftenbeld, and Rowett thought that his anxiety to regain his place in the team made him try too hard when coming on as a substitute. After a strong performance in the League Cup against Premier League Aston Villa, Davis started and played well in two consecutive away wins, but his next start did not come until mid-March. Away to Wolverhampton Wanderers, he came close to scoring the winning goal and, according to Rowett, "controlled the match with his physicality. He gets about the place, he holds people off and comes out with the ball. He does that really, really well." The club promptly took up their option for a further year on his contract, and Rowett said they were considering an extension until 2018. Davis scored his first goal of the season in the penultimate match, a "brilliant half-volley from the edge of the area" after the ball was not fully cleared by the defence, to secure a draw at home to Middlesbrough. Although he started a third fewer Championship matches than in 2014–15, he established himself in the team towards the end of the season because of what the Birmingham Mail viewed as the stability he gave to the side.

Although the return of Tesche on a permanent contract seemed likely to endanger Davis's first-team place, he began the 2016–17 season in the starting eleven. He was booked in each of the first four matches, but two goals and a series of strong performances meant that when the fifth booking finally arrived in mid-October, he came straight back into the side after serving his suspension. He was named man of the match in the Second City derby against Aston Villa. Initially used on the right of midfield to counteract the attacking threat of Jordan Amavi, he moved into a more familiar central role after David Cotterill entered the match, and within minutes scored the equalising goal with a composed finish from the edge of the penalty area. The goal earned him the club's Moment of the Season award.

January 2017 began with six months left on his contract and the club linked with signings in midfield; new manager Gianfranco Zola confirmed that Davis had "a big future" with the club, that Zola and the staff trusted him and that agreement on a new contract was imminent. On 13 January – amid reports of Davis being a transfer target for divisional rivals Nottingham Forest, Queens Park Rangers and Fulham and two days after Birmingham re-signed midfielder Craig Gardner – he signed a new three-and-a-half-year contract. In a struggling side, that avoided relegation only by winning the last two matches of the campaign, Davis set personal bests in terms of league goals (4) and Championship starts (40) – despite missing four matches through suspension after finishing with the worst disciplinary record in the division. He was recognised both by the club's supporters and by its players as player of the season.

Davis was again a fixture in the 2017–18 starting eleven despite a regular turnover of managers. Harry Redknapp's attempts to sign defensive midfielders such as Afriyie Acquah and Alex Song fell through, and the club turned down an offer of "around £1.5 million" for Davis to link up with Rowett at Derby County. The player welcomed a period of intensive training under successor Steve Cotterill, and hoped it would boost his performance to the standards he admitted not having reached thus far. In November, Cotterill chose Davis to captain the team when Michael Morrison was not in the starting eleven, but the experiment did not last. Through Christmas and January, he was used in a more advanced role as part of a stable starting eleven that produced a series of wins that lifted the team out of the relegation places; he scored twice, in 3–1 wins against Sunderland and Sheffield Wednesday, and his assist in the latter match was "evidence of how effective he can be running in behind".

Injuries to Davis and others coincided with a dip in the team's form, and in early March, Cotterill was replaced as manager by Garry Monk. The knee problem kept Davis out until he was safe from suspension for 10 yellow cards; he returned to the team as a late substitute in a 3–0 win against Hull City, and started the remaining eight matches of the season in the centre of a 4–4–2 formation as Birmingham again avoided relegation on the final day. He ended the campaign with 38 league appearances and 14 yellow cards, and signed a one-year extension to his contract to take its expiry date to 2021.

Davis fractured an ankle in training in early July 2018 and required surgery. He returned to action on 12 February 2019, as a late substitute, and finished the season with 11 appearances.

On 14 January 2021, Davis was released by Birmingham City after six and a half years at the club.

==== Charlton Athletic loan ====
On 31 January 2020, Davis moved to Championship club Charlton Athletic on loan for the rest of the 2019–20 season. On 1 June 2020, Charlton manager Lee Bowyer confirmed Davis' refusal to play for the club ahead of the resumption of the 2019–20 EFL Championship season, following the suspension of the season due to the COVID-19 pandemic in the United Kingdom.

=== Shrewsbury Town ===
On 15 January 2021, Davis rejoined League One club Shrewsbury Town – where he had played on loan ten years earlier – until the end of the 2020–21 season. After a period in self-isolation because of contact with someone with COVID-19, he made his first appearance on 2 February, playing just behind the forwards for the last few minutes of a defeat at home to Crewe Alexandra.

On 12 May 2021 it was announced that he would leave Shrewsbury at the end of the season, following the expiry of his contract. He returned to the club on 13 July 2021.

=== Forest Green Rovers ===
On 17 June 2022, Davis agreed to join newly promoted League One side Forest Green Rovers when his Shrewsbury Town contract expired.

On 30 January 2023, Davis joined National League club Solihull Moors on loan until the end of the season.

He was released following relegation to the National League at the end of the 2023–24 season.

=== Kidderminster Harriers ===
On 16 July 2024, Davis joined National League North side Kidderminster Harriers.

== Style of play ==
On joining Walsall as a 19-year-old, Davis described himself as "the type of player who likes to break things down and do what I call the 'nitty-gritty'. I like to get stuck in and work hard". He is primarily a defensive midfielder, reportedly priding himself on "ball-winning ground-covering defensive midfield work"; his major contribution to his team comes from "flying around midfield winning the ball and disrupting the opposition". Lee Clark suggested he looks best when using his power and strength and keeping his use of the ball simple. Dean Saunders mentioned his "winning mentality"; according to the Birmingham Mail's Brian Dick, "when Blues are down no-one leads by example quite as much as Davis".

== Career statistics ==
As of match played 12 April 2025

Appearances and goals by club, season and competition
Club	Season	League			National cup		League cup		Other		Total	
Club	Season	Division	Apps	Goals	Apps	Goals	Apps	Goals	Apps	Goals	Apps	Goals
Wolverhampton Wanderers	2009–10	Premier League	0	0	0	0	0	0	—		0	0
Wolverhampton Wanderers	2010–11	Premier League	0	0	0	0	0	0	—		0	0
Wolverhampton Wanderers	2011–12	Premier League	7	0	0	0	1	0	—		8	0
Wolverhampton Wanderers	2012–13	Championship	28	0	1	0	3	0	—		32	0
Wolverhampton Wanderers	2013–14	League One	18	0	1	0	1	0	1 (Note: Appearance(s) in Football League Trophy)	0	21	0
Wolverhampton Wanderers	2014–15	Championship	0	0	—		—		—		0	0
Wolverhampton Wanderers	Total		53	0	2	0	5	0	1	0	61	0
Darlington (loan)	2009–10	League Two	5	0	1	0	—		—		6	0
Walsall (loan)	2010–11	League One	7	0	—		—		—		7	0
Shrewsbury Town (loan)	2010–11	League Two	19	2	—		—		2 (Note: Appearances in League Two play-offs)	0	21	2
Inverness Caledonian Thistle (loan)	2011–12	Scottish Premier League	14	1	1	0	—		—		15	1
Chesterfield (loan)	2011–12	League One	9	0	—		—		2	0	11	0
Birmingham City	2014–15	Championship	42	3	1	0	1	0	—		44	3
Birmingham City	2015–16	Championship	35	1	1	0	3	0	—		39	1
Birmingham City	2016–17	Championship	41	4	2	0	0	0	—		43	4
Birmingham City	2017–18	Championship	38	2	1	0	2	1	—		41	3
Birmingham City	2018–19	Championship	11	0	0	0	0	0	—		11	0
Birmingham City	2019–20	Championship	15	0	1	0	0	0	—		16	0
Birmingham City	2020–21	Championship	0	0	0	0	0	0	—		0	0
Birmingham City	Total		182	10	6	0	6	1	—		194	11
Charlton Athletic (loan)	2019–20	Championship	5	0	—		—		—		5	0
Shrewsbury Town	2020–21	League One	21	0	0	0	—		—		21	0
Shrewsbury Town	2021–22	League One	27	1	2	0	1	0	2 (Note: Appearance(s) in EFL Trophy)	0	32	1
Shrewsbury Town	Total		48	1	2	0	1	0	2	0	53	1
Forest Green Rovers	2022–23	League One	12	0	1	0	2	0	2	0	17	0
Forest Green Rovers	2023–24	League Two	0	0	0	0	0	0	0	0	0	0
Forest Green Rovers	Total		12	0	1	0	2	0	2	0	17	0
Solihull Moors (loan)	2022–23	National League	2	0	—		—		—		2	0
Kidderminster Harriers	2024–25	National League North	37	1	4	0	—		4 (Note: Appearances in FA Trophy)	0	45	1
Career total			393	15	17	0	14	1	13	0	437	16

== Honours ==
Wolverhampton Wanderers

- Football League One: 2013–14

Kidderminster Harriers

- National League North play-offs: 2026
