= Jordan Marshall (footballer, born 1993) =

English footballer (born 1993)

Personal information
- Date of birth: 10 May 1993 (age 33)
- Place of birth: Gateshead, England
- Height: 5 ft 11 in (1.80 m)
- Position: Forward

Youth career
- 2008–2010: Darlington

Senior career*
Years	Team	Apps	(Gls)
2010–2011	Darlington	3	(0)
2011–2012	Gateshead	0	(0)
2012	Norton & Stockton Ancients		
2012	Billingham Synthonia	4	(1)
2012	Sunderland RCA		
2012–2013	Newcastle Benfield		
2013	Team Northumbria		
2013–2014	Sunderland RCA		
2014–201?	Marske United		
- * Club domestic league appearances and goals

Jordan Marshall (born 10 May 1993) is an English footballer who plays as a forward. He made his debut in the Football League for Darlington in April 2010 as a 16-year-old. Since then he has played non-league football for a number of Northern League clubs.

== Darlington ==
Marshall was born in Gateshead, and joined Darlington on a youth contract in 2009. He made his first-team debut at the age of 16 on 27 April 2010 – becoming the 54th player used that season – replacing Nathan Mulligan in the 72nd minute as Darlington lost 5–0 at home to Notts County, a result which confirmed County as champions of Football League Two. He made his third and final first-team appearance for financially desperate Darlington eleven days later in their last match before relegation from the Football League, a 2–0 defeat at home to Dagenham & Redbridge.

In 2010–11, he played for Darlington's youth team in their run to the final of the Youth Alliance League Cup, but did not play in the final itself, which Darlington lost on penalties to Wycombe Wanderers' youth team. He was released at the end of the season.

== Non-league football ==
After a trial with Whitby Town, Marshall played for Gateshead reserves during the 2011–12 season, while continuing his education at Gateshead College. He featured for them in the final of the Durham Challenge Cup on 6 April 2012, a 3–0 defeat to Spennymoor Town.

During the 2012–13 season, Marshall played for Northern League sides Norton & Stockton Ancients, Billingham Synthonia, Sunderland RCA, Newcastle Benfield and Team Northumbria. He signed for Marske United from Sunderland RCA in January 2014.
