= Andrew Milne (footballer) =

Scottish footballer

Personal information
- Full name: Andrew Alexander Milne
- Date of birth: 30 September 1990 (age 36)
- Place of birth: York, England
- Height: 5 ft 11 in (1.80 m)
- Position: Defender

Team information
- Current team: Scarborough Athletic

Youth career
- 1999–2009: Leeds United

Senior career*
| Years | Team | Apps | (Gls) |
| 2009–2010 | Leeds United | 0 | (0) |
| 2009 | → Darlington (loan) | 2 | (0) |
| 2010 | → Darlington (loan) | 19 | (0) |
| 2010–2011 | Barrow | 2 | (0) |
| 2010 | → Gainsborough Trinity (loan) | 4 | (1) |
| 2010–2011 | → Altrincham (loan) | 11 | (1) |
| 2011 | FC Halifax Town | 15 | (0) |
| 2011–2012 | Ossett Town | 42 | (?) |
| 2012–2014 | Scarborough Athletic | 86 | (6) |
| 2014–2021 | Tadcaster Albion | 70 | (11) |

International career^{‡}
| 2007 | Scotland U19 | 4 | (0) |
- * Club domestic league appearances and goals as of 18:00, 18 September 2010 (UTC) ‡ National team caps and goals as of 08:17, 11 May 2010 (UTC)

Andrew Alexander Milne (born 9 September 1990) is a former professional footballer who played for clubs including Darlington, Barrow and Tadcaster Albion.

== Club career ==
Milne was born in York. He joined Leeds United at the age of nine, spent 10 years with the club's Academy system and went on to become Head Boy and Captain of the Under 18s. Around this time, he also obtained international caps for Scotland under-18s and broke into Gary McAllister's Leeds first team squad, being involved in 2009 pre-season friendly matches.

On 26 November 2009, Milne signed for Darlington on loan for three months, at the same time as Chesterfield defender Danny Hall and midfielder Paul Harsley. Milne made his debut in the Football League on 5 December 2009, playing the whole of the 1–0 home defeat against Bradford City, earning man of the match. In his second game, a 5–0 defeat to Torquay United, he sustained an ankle injury and was replaced by midfielder Josh Gray. He returned to Leeds to recover from his injury.

On 5 March 2010, Milne rejoined Darlington on loan until the end of the season under former Republic of Ireland Manager Steve Staunton.

It was announced on 14 May 2010 that he would not be offered a new deal at Leeds and that he was free to find a new club. He signed for Barrow AFC of the Conference National just two days before the start of the next season. During this season he was also loaned out to Gainsborough Trinity of the Conference North.

After impressing during his loan spell at Gainsborough, he joined Conference National side Altrincham F.C. on loan. He made 11 total appearances for the club, scoring once against Rushden & Diamonds.

In January 2011 he signed for FC Halifax Town on a deal until the end of the season. Milne then moved onto Ossett Town and Scarborough Athletic, to enable him to concentrate on his education at York St John University.

In March 2012 he signed for Altrincham as cover but did not make an appearance.

Milne joined Tadcaster Albion in 2014 and was Players' and Supporters' Player of the Year 2014. Milne remained at Tadcaster for 7 years, helping the club to an FA Vase quarter final tie and twice winning the club's player of the season award. He retired in April 2021 due to work commitments and injury.

== Personal life ==
Milne attended Fulford School, in the York area and still lives in the city today.

Milne worked for i2i International Soccer Academy before working in the health sector.
