= Mark Convery =

English footballer (born 1981)

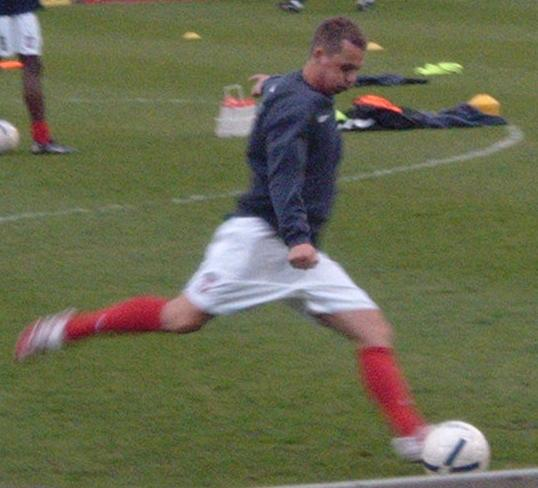
- Convery training with York City in 2007

Personal information
- Full name: Mark Peter Convery
- Date of birth: 29 May 1981 (age 45)
- Place of birth: Newcastle upon Tyne, England
- Height: 5 ft 6 in (1.68 m)
- Position: Midfielder

Team information
- Current team: Whitley Bay

Youth career
- 1999–2000: Sunderland

Senior career*
Years	Team	Apps	(Gls)
2000–2001	Sunderland	0	(0)
2000–2001	→ Hvidovre IF (loan)	5	(0)
2001–2005	Darlington	76	(2)
2005–2007	York City	67	(8)
2007–2009	Cambridge United	33	(3)
2008	→ Weymouth (loan)	6	(0)
2009	Newcastle Blue Star	?	(?)
2009–2010	Darlington	21	(0)
2010–	Bedlington Terriers	?	(?)
- * Club domestic league appearances and goals as of 17:55, 24 August 2010 (UTC)

Mark Peter Convery (born 29 May 1981) is an English football manager and former footballer. Since November 2015, he has been manager of Newcastle Benfield.

== Career ==
Born in Newcastle upon Tyne, Tyne and Wear, Convery started his career with Sunderland in 1999 and he joined Hvidovre IF of the Danish First Division on loan for four months in July 2000. He made his debut for the team against Ølstykke FC on 30 July 2000 and made six appearances during his loan spell.

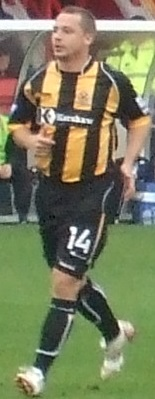
Convery playing for Cambridge United in 2008

He was signed by Third Division side Darlington in January 2001 on a free transfer.

He signed for York City in the Conference National on 30 June 2005. He signed a new deal at York in July 2006 after being offered a contract extension earlier that summer. He had been out of action since mid-October 2006 with a foot injury and it is now thought he had damaged a metatarsal, with a visit to a specialist expected to confirm another six-week lay-off, and made his comeback for the team against Northwich Victoria on 6 March 2007. He was released by York City at the end of the 2006–07 season on 16 May 2007.

He was signed by Conference Premier side Cambridge United on 2 July 2007, after agreeing a two-year contract with the club. He made his debut against former club York in August 2007, during which he sustained a hamstring injury. He joined Weymouth on loan until the end of the 2007–08 season in March and made his debut in a 4–2 defeat against Farsley Celtic. Convery was believed to have been made available for transfer by Cambridge after the end of the season. He eventually remained with the club and scored from long-range in Cambridge's match against Crawley Town on 15 November in the 90th minute, which ensured a 2–2 draw for the team, and he hoped this would ensure him a place in the team. He was released by the club on 24 March 2009, after being informed he would not be offered a new contract in the summer. He later joined Newcastle Blue Star in the Northern Premier League Division One North.

He was named in former club Darlington's squad, when the North East club's squad numbers were released, having played in a couple of their pre-season matches at the beginning of the 2009–10 season. He scored for Darlington from close range in their 2–1 defeat to Leeds United in the Football League Trophy on 6 October. He was released by the club following their relegation from League Two, along with 13 other players.

Convery joined Northern League Division One team Bedlington Terriers during the summer of 2010.

Convery then went on to join fellow Northern League Division One rivals Whitley Bay in the summer of 2013.

== Career statistics ==
Appearances and goals by club, season and competition
Club	Season	League			National Cup (Note: Includes FA Cup, Danish Cup)		League Cup (Note: Includes Football League Cup, Conference League Cup)		Other		Total	
Club	Season	Division	Apps	Goals	Apps	Goals	Apps	Goals	Apps	Goals	Apps	Goals
Sunderland	2000–01	Premier League	0	0	0	0	—		—		0	0
Hvidovre (loan)	2000–01	Danish 1st Division	5	0	1	0	—		—		6	0
Darlington	2000–01	Third Division	11	0	—		—		1 (Note: Appearance(s) in Football League Trophy)	0	12	0
Darlington	2001–02	Third Division	17	0	2	0	1	0	0	0	20	0
Darlington	2002–03	Third Division	0	0	0	0	0	0	1	0	1	0
Darlington	2003–04	Third Division	25	2	0	0	0	0	1	0	26	2
Darlington	2004–05	League Two	23	0	1	0	1	0	1	0	26	0
Darlington	Total		76	2	3	0	2	0	4	0	85	2
York City	2005–06	Football Conference	42	6	2	1	—		1 (Note: Appearance(s) in FA Trophy)	0	45	7
York City	2006–07	Football Conference	24	2	0	0	—		1 (Note: Appearance in Conference play-offs)	0	25	2
York City	Total		66	8	2	1	—		2	0	70	9
Cambridge United	2007–08	Conference Premier	21	2	2	0	0	0	2	0	25	2
Cambridge United	2008–09	Conference Premier	12	1	0	0	1	0	0	0	13	1
Cambridge United	Total		33	3	2	0	1	0	2	0	38	3
Weymouth (loan)	2007–08	Conference Premier	5	0	—		—		—		5	0
Darlington	2009–10	League Two	21	0	1	0	0	0	2	1	24	1
Total			206	13	9	1	3	0	10	1	228	15

== Honours ==
Newcastle Blue Star

- Northern Premier League Division One North play-offs: 2008–09
