= Patrick Dean =

Patrick Dean may refer to:

- Patrick Dean (diplomat) (1909–1994), British ambassador
- Patrick Dean (cartoonist) (1976–2021), American cartoonist and illustrator
- Pat Dean (born 1989), American baseball pitcher

== See also ==
- Patrick Deane (footballer) (born 1990), Scottish footballer
- Patrick Deane (professor) (born 1956), Canadian scholar and university administrator
