= Chris Moore (footballer, born 1984) =

English footballer

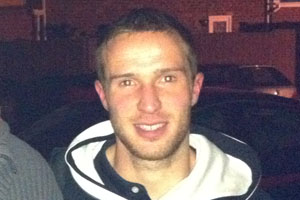

Personal information
- Full name: James Christopher Moore
- Date of birth: 17 January 1984 (age 42)
- Place of birth: Newcastle upon Tyne, England
- Height: 5 ft 9 in (1.75 m)
- Position: Winger

Team information
- Current team: Sunderland (youth coach)

Youth career
- –: Newcastle United

Senior career*
Years	Team	Apps	(Gls)
2003–2004	Bishop Auckland	57	(10)
2004–2005	Whitley Bay	15	(5)
2007–2009	Whitley Bay	59	(14)
2009	Durham City	1	(0)
2009–2010	Whitley Bay	25	(3)
2010–2011	Darlington	25	(1)
2010	→ Spennymoor Town (loan)	5	(1)
2011–2012	Gateshead	24	(3)
2012	Whitley Bay	0	(0)
2012	Barrow	5	(0)
2013	Darlington 1883	0	(0)
2014	Blyth Spartans		
2014–2015	Consett		
2015	Ashington		
2015–2016	Durham City		

Managerial career
- 2015–2016: Durham City
- 2018–2019: Consett
- * Club domestic league appearances and goals as of 08:57, 19 December 2012 (UTC)

James Christopher Moore (born 17 January 1984) is an English former professional footballer. He is a youth coach at Sunderland.

== Career ==
Moore was born in Newcastle upon Tyne. He began his football career in Newcastle United's Academy, then played non-League football for Bishop Auckland and Whitley Bay before taking a degree in journalism at Rutgers University in New Jersey. On returning to England in 2008 he rejoined Whitley Bay, and, after a one-game stint at Durham City, was part of their FA Vase-winning team in 2009. In March 2010, he turned professional for the first time, signing a contract with Football League Two club Darlington to run until the end of the 2010–11 season. He made his debut in the Football League two days later as a half-time substitute as Darlington lost 2–0 at Northampton Town.

In September 2010 he joined Northern League club Spennymoor Town on what turned out "an impressive month"'s loan, scoring three goals from six games (one from five in the League). Moore was part of Darlington's FA Trophy winning side, playing all 120 minutes against Mansfield Town on 7 May 2011. He was not offered a new contract and was released by Darlington a week later.

In July 2011, Moore went on trial at Gateshead. He played in five pre-season friendlies before signing an initial six-month contract on 27 July 2011. He made his Gateshead debut as a second-half substitute on 13 August in their 3–2 win over Kidderminster Harriers at Aggborough. He scored his first goal for Gateshead in his first start 10 days later in a 3–1 win against Southport at Haig Avenue. On 31 December 2011, Moore had his contract extended until the end of the season. Moore was released by Gateshead on 30 April 2012.

Moore joined Barrow in August 2012, and subsequently moved onto Darlington 1883, Blyth Spartans, Consett and Ashington, before becoming manager of Durham City in November 2015. He left Durham in October 2016, and subsequently coached at Whitley Bay and North Shields. In May 2018 he was appointed manager of Consett. In May 2019 he left the club to join Sunderland as a youth coach.

== Career statistics ==
=== Club ===
As of 9 April 2012

Appearances and goals by club, season and competition
Club	Season	League^{[A]}		FA Cup		League Cup		Other^{[B]}		Total	
Club	Season	Apps	Goals	Apps	Goals	Apps	Goals	Apps	Goals	Apps	Goals
Bishop Auckland	2003–04	34	7	2	0	0	0	10	2	46	9
Bishop Auckland	2004–05	23	3	1	1	0	0	4	0	28	4
Bishop Auckland	Total	57	10	3	1	0	0	14	2	74	13
Whitley Bay	2004–05	15	5	0	0	0	0	3	2	18	7
Whitley Bay	2007–08	22	2	1	0	0	0	7	0	30	2
Whitley Bay	2008–09	35	12	4	1	0	0	12	1	51	14
Whitley Bay	2009–10	2	0	0	0	0	0	0	0	2	0
Durham City	2009–10	1	0	0	0	0	0	0	0	1	0
Whitley Bay	2009–10	25	3	2	0	0	0	10	2	37	5
Whitley Bay	Total	99	22	7	1	0	0	32	5	138	28
Darlington	2009–10	11	0	0	0	0	0	0	0	11	0
Darlington	2010–11	14	1	3	0	0	0	3	0	20	1
Darlington	Total	25	1	3	0	0	0	3	0	31	1
Spennymoor Town (loan)	2010–11	5	1	0	0	0	0	1	2	6	3
Gateshead	2011–12	24	3	2	0	0	0	4	0	30	3
Career totals		211	37	15	2	0	0	54	9	280	48

A. The "League" column constitutes appearances and goals (including those as a substitute) in the English Football League, Football Conference, Northern Premier League and Northern League.
B. The "Other" column constitutes appearances and goals (including those as a substitute) in the FA Trophy, FA Vase, Durham Challenge Cup, Northumberland Senior Cup, Northern Premier League Challenge Cup and Northern League Cup.
