= Serigne Diop =

French footballer (born 1988)

Mo Diop
Personal information
- Full name: Mor Serigne Diop
- Date of birth: 29 September 1988 (age 38)
- Place of birth: Paris, France
- Height: 1.93 m (6 ft 4 in)
- Positions: Striker; winger

Senior career*
Years	Team	Apps	(Gls)
2006–2007	Stal Alchevsk	11	(1)
2007	Metalurh Donetsk	0	(0)
2008	Arsenal Kyiv	0	(0)
2008	→ Germinal Beerschot (loan)	1	(0)
2008	Apollon Limassol	0	(0)
2008	→ PAEEK (loan)		
2009	Eivissa-Ibiza	9	(2)
2009–2010	Darlington	23	(2)
2013–2014	UJA Maccabi	22	(13)
2014	Hereford United	9	(11)
2015	Gloucester City	2	(0)
2015	Sutton Coldfield Town	9	(5)
2015–2016	Bedford Town	12	(4)
2016–2017	Rushall Olympic		
2017	Redditch United	2	(0)
- * Club domestic league appearances and goals

Mor Serigne Diop (born 29 September 1988) is a French footballer.

== Career ==
Diop was born in Paris, France. He played in Ukraine for FC Metalurh Donetsk, spent the 2006–07 season on loan to FC Stal Alchevsk and Belgian side K.F.C. Germinal Beerschot. In August 2008 he moved to Cyprus and Apollon Limassol before playing on loan for PAEEK FC. He then played for Spanish side SE Eivissa-Ibiza. On 22 October 2009, Diop was one of four new players brought to Darlington by new manager Steve Staunton. Diop was signed on a short-term contract, although he needed international clearance to officially complete his signing and picked up a slight muscle injury ruling him out of that weekend's league trip to Barnet. He scored his first goal for Darlington in a 3-1 FA Cup defeat at Barnet on 7 November 2009. He was one of several players released early from their Darlington contracts towards the end of the 2009–10 season.

On 29 October 2015, Diop signed for Bedford Town FC, teaming up with former Hereford United manager Jon Taylor.

He signed for Rushall Olympic F.C. in 2016.

== Honours ==
PAEEK FC

- Cypriot Third Division: 2007–08
