= Rikki Bains =

English footballer

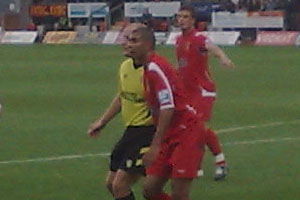
- Bains in 2007

Personal information
- Full name: Rikki Lee Bains
- Date of birth: 3 February 1988 (age 38)
- Place of birth: Coventry, England
- Height: 6 ft 1 in (1.85 m)
- Position: Defender

Team information
- Current team: Bedworth United

Senior career*
Years	Team	Apps	(Gls)
2005–2006	Coventry City	0	(0)
2006–2007	Accrington Stanley	3	(0)
2006	→ Leek Town (loan)	3	(0)
2007–2008	Tamworth	33	(0)
2008	→ King's Lynn (loan)	14	(1)
2008–2009	Corby Town	20	(0)
2009	Macclesfield Town	2	(0)
2009–2010	Darlington	4	(0)
2009	→ Blyth Spartans (loan)	4	(0)
2010	→ Gateshead (loan)	5	(0)
2010	Ilkeston Town		
2010–2011	Hinckley United	32	(1)
2011–2012	Barwell	0	(0)
2012	Sutton Coldfield Town		
2012–	Bedworth United		
- * Club domestic league appearances and goals as of 14:50, 1 November 2012 (UTC)

Rikki Lee Bains (born 3 February 1988 in Coventry) is an English footballer who plays for Bedworth United. He is a defender.

== Playing career ==
=== Coventry City ===
Bains, who is of Asian origin, began his career as a trainee with Coventry City where he had been since he was 11 years of age. At the end of the 2005–06 season, Bains was released by Coventry after failing to make the first team squad.

=== Accrington Stanley ===
Bains was picked up by League Two side Accrington Stanley to add strength to their backline for the return to league football. His debut was as a substitute at home to Bury where he came on after 22 minutes for Danny Ventre and was denied a clean sheet on his debut due to a 77th-minute goal from Andy Bishop. He played two more games, before Leam Richardson took over at right back, seeing Bains dropped from the first team. He never regained his place in the team and left the club.

=== Tamworth ===
On 18 January 2007, just before his 19th birthday, he joined Conference National side Tamworth. Bains proved to be a hit with Tamworth and their fans, and even though the club were relegated from the Conference National at the end of the 2006–07 season, Bains committed his future to the club for the 2007–08 season in the Conference North.

=== Darlington ===
Bains spent time on loan at King's Lynn, and played for Corby Town and Macclesfield Town, before signing for Darlington in August 2009 after impressing during training. On 6 November 2009, Baines signed for Conference North club Blyth Spartans on loan. He scored one goal (against Morpeth Town in the Northumberland Senior Cup) in seven appearances in league and cup competitions, before returning to Darlington. In January 2010, Bains signed for Conference National club Gateshead again on loan, until the end of the season, with a view to a permanent deal. He returned to Darlington at the end of the Conference North season, and was released early from his Darlington contract.

=== Hinckley United ===
Bains started the 2010–11 season with Ilkeston Town, but after they were wound up in September 2010, he signed for Hinckley United on 1 October 2010. He was injured for the majority of the season so only really trained with the youth team then he got released.
