= Moses Barnett =

English footballer (born 1990)

Personal information
- Date of birth: 3 December 1990 (age 35)
- Place of birth: Koidu, Sierra Leone
- Position: Left back

Youth career
- 2000–2007: Arsenal
- 2007–2009: Everton

Senior career*
Years	Team	Apps	(Gls)
2009–2010	Everton	0	(0)
2009	→ Darlington (loan)	4	(0)
2011	Aberystwyth Town	9	(0)
2011–2012	Burscough	?	(?)
2012–2015	Caernarfon Town	?	(?)
2015	Cefn Druids	?	(?)
2015–2016	Conwy Borough	?	(?)
2017–?	Caernarfon Town	?	(?)
2019	Conwy Borough	?	(?)
2019	Denbigh Town	?	(?)

International career^{‡}
2005–2006	England U16	5	(0)
2006	England U17	7	(0)
- * Club domestic league appearances and goals as of 22:34, 11 January 2012 (UTC) ‡ National team caps and goals as of 09:02, 27 April 2011 (UTC)

Moses Barnett (born 3 December 1990) is an English footballer who played in the Football League for Darlington. He started his career at Everton but was released from the club in 2010. He plays as a defender, his preferred position being at left back but also able to play on the right. He currently plays for Denbigh Town.

== Club career ==
Barnett started as a youth team player with Arsenal before joining Everton near the end of the 2006–07 season. He signed on loan for Darlington on 9 October 2009, making his debut the next day in a 2–0 away defeat to Dagenham & Redbridge.

He joined Welsh Premier League club Aberystwyth Town and played only nine games, before signing for Burscough on 5 November 2011 for the rest of the 2011–12 season.

In 2019 he signed for Conwy Borough before moving later in the year to Denbigh Town.
