= Ashlee Jones =

English footballer (born 1987)

Personal information
- Full name: Ashlee Ageron Jones
- Date of birth: 4 August 1987 (age 39)
- Place of birth: Walthamstow, England
- Height: 6 ft 1 in (1.85 m)
- Position: Goalkeeper

Team information
- Current team: Walthamstow

Youth career
- Southampton

Senior career*
Years	Team	Apps	(Gls)
2005–2006	Rushden & Diamonds	0	(0)
2006	Basingstoke Town	5	(0)
2007	Harrow Borough	7	(0)
2007–2008	Potters Bar Town	40	(0)
2008	Crawley Town	0	(0)
2008–2009	Fisher Athletic	13	(0)
2009	Kingstonian	3	(0)
2009	Wycombe Wanderers	0	(0)
2009–2010	Darlington	1	(0)
2010–2011	Boreham Wood	12	(0)
2011	Billericay Town	6	(0)
2011–2012	Braintree Town	0	(0)
2012	Wealdstone	9	(0)
2012–2013	Canvey Island	41	(0)
2013–2015	Lowestoft Town	81	(0)
2015–2016	Leiston	37	(0)
2016–2017	Chesham United	35	(0)
2017	Leiston	11	(0)
2017	Staines Town	6	(0)
2017	Harlow Town	4	(0)
2017–2018	Canvey Island	15	(0)
2017	→ East Thurrock United (loan)	1	(0)
2018–2019	Braintree Town	3	(0)
2018	→ Coggeshall Town (loan)	1	(0)
2019	Bedford Town	19	(0)
2019–2020	Coggeshall Town	21	(0)
2020	Heybridge Swifts	1	(0)
2020	→ Hashtag United (loan)	0	(0)
2020–2021	Romford	0	(0)
2020	→ Hashtag United (loan)	1	(0)
2021–2022	Waltham Abbey	15	(0)
2022	Harlow Town	15	(0)
2022–2023	Welwyn Garden City	2	(0)
2023	Potters Bar Town	2	(0)
2023–2024	Walthamstow	12	(0)
2024	Saffron Walden Town	1	(0)
2025–	Haringey Borough	9	(0)
- * Club domestic league appearances and goals as of 21:34, 30 August 2025 (UTC)

Ashlee Ageron Jones (born 4 August 1987) is an English footballer who plays as a goalkeeper for Spartan South Midlands League Premier Division club Haringey Borough.

Jones came through the ranks at Southampton where he was a member of the squad that reached the FA Youth Cup Final in 2005. He later played in the Football League for Darlington, and includes Rushden & Diamonds, Wycombe Wanderers, Braintree Town and Lowestoft Town among his former clubs.

== Career ==
Jones was born in Walthamstow, London. He played for Rushden & Diamonds, Potters Bar Town, Fisher Athletic and Crawley Town before signing for Wycombe Wanderers in March 2009 on a non-contract basis.

In October 2009, Jones joined League Two club Darlington. He made his Football League debut on 1 December 2009 for Darlington in their 4–0 away defeat against Notts County. His contract was cancelled by mutual consent on 16 February 2010.

Jones signed for Isthmian League Premier Division club Canvey Island on 17 August 2012, and joined Lowestoft Town the following season on a one-year contract. During the 2017–18 season, he returned to Canvey Island.

Following a spell with East Thurrock United, Jones returned to Braintree Town prior to the 2018–19 campaign. After three league appearances, and a couple of matches on loan at Coggeshall Town, Jones made the switch to Southern League club Bedford Town and made his debut in their FA Trophy defeat to Chesterfield. He helped them reach the play-offs, in which they lost to Corby Town, and rejoined Coggeshall Town at the end of the season. He played regularly for Coggeshall before signing for another Isthmian League North club, Heybridge Swifts, in March 2020, shortly before the leagues were abandoned because of the COVID-19 pandemic.

Jones signed for Essex Senior League club Hashtag United on a 1 game loan and played his first and last game in the FA Cup against Soham Town Rangers on 21 September 2020. He subsequently signed for Romford, before returning to Hashtag United on loan for a league match away to Walthamstow.

In August 2021, Jones joined Waltham Abbey. He made his debut in a loss to Bedford Town on 14 August 2021.

In January 2022, Jones signed for Harlow Town for a second time, after he had a previous short-term spell with the Hawks in October 2017. He played his first game since re-signing in a 3–0 win against Colney Heath on 25 January 2022. In February 2023, he signed for Potters Bar Town following a spell with Welwyn Garden City.

During the 2023–24 season, Jones played for his hometown club, Walthamstow.

== Career statistics ==
As of match played 10 February 2024

Appearances and goals by club, season and competition
Club	Season	League			FA Cup		League Cup		Other		Total	
Club	Season	Division	Apps	Goals	Apps	Goals	Apps	Goals	Apps	Goals	Apps	Goals
Rushden & Diamonds	2005–06	Conference Premier	0	0	0	0	0	0	0	0	0	0
Basingstoke Town	2005–06	Conference South	5	0	0	0	0	0	0	0	5	0
Harrow Borough	2006–07	Isthmian League Premier Division	7	0	0	0	0	0	0	0	7	0
Potters Bar Town	2007–08	Isthmian League Division One North	40	0	0	0	0	0	0	0	40	0
Crawley Town	2007–08	Conference Premier	0	0	0	0	0	0	0	0	0	0
Fisher Athletic	2008–09	Conference South	13	0	0	0	0	0	0	0	13	0
Kingstonian	2008–09	Isthmian League Division One South	3	0	0	0	0	0	0	0	3	0
Wycombe Wanderers	2008–09	League Two	0	0	0	0	0	0	0	0	0	0
Darlington	2009–10	League Two	1	0	0	0	0	0	0	0	0	0
Boreham Wood	2010–11	Conference South	12	0	1	0	0	0	1	0	14	0
Billericay Town	2010–11	Isthmian League Premier Division	6	0	0	0	0	0	0	0	6	0
Braintree Town	2011–12	Conference Premier	0	0	0	0	0	0	0	0	0	0
Wealdstone	2011–12	Isthmian League Premier Division	9	0	0	0	0	0	2	0	11	0
Canvey Island	2012–13	Isthmian League Premier Division	41	0	0	0	0	0	7	0	48	0
Lowestoft Town	2013–14	Isthmian League Premier Division	33	0	0	0	0	0	1	0	34	0
Lowestoft Town	2014–15	Conference North	34	0	0	0	0	0	1	0	35	0
Lowestoft Town	Total		67	0	0	0	0	0	2	0	69	0
Leiston	2015–16	Isthmian League Premier Division	37	0	3	0	0	0	5	0	45	0
Chesham United	2016–17	Southern League Premier Division	35	0	2	0	0	0	5	0	42	0
Leiston	2016–17	Isthmian League Premier Division	11	0	0	0	0	0	0	0	11	0
Staines Town	2017–18	Isthmian League Premier Division	6	0	1	0	0	0	0	0	7	0
Harlow Town	2017–18	Isthmian League Premier Division	4	0	0	0	0	0	0	0	4	0
Canvey Island	2017–18	Isthmian League Division One North	15	0	0	0	0	0	0	0	15	0
→ East Thurrock United (loan)	2017–18	National League South	1	0	0	0	0	0	0	0	1	0
Braintree Town	2018–19	National League South	3	0	0	0	0	0	0	0	3	0
→ Coggeshall Town (loan)	2018–19	Isthmian League Division One North	1	0	0	0	0	0	1	0	2	0
Bedford Town	2018–19	Southern League Division One Central	19	0	0	0	0	0	2	0	21	0
Coggeshall Town	2019–20	Isthmian League Division One North	21	0	2	0	0	0	4	0	27	0
Heybridge Swifts	2019–20	Isthmian League Division One North	1	0	0	0	0	0	0	0	1	0
Heybridge Swifts	2020–21	Isthmian League Division One North	0	0	0	0	0	0	0	0	0	0
Heybridge Swifts	Total		1	0	0	0	0	0	0	0	1	0
→ Hashtag United (loan)	2020–21	Essex Senior League	0	0	1	0	0	0	0	0	1	0
Romford	2020–21	Isthmian League Division One North	0	0	1	0	0	0	0	0	1	0
→ Hashtag United (loan)	2020–21	Essex Senior League	1	0	0	0	0	0	0	0	1	0
Waltham Abbey	2021–22	Southern League Division One Central	17	0	0	0	0	0	4	0	21	0
Harlow Town	2021–22	Southern League Division One Central	15	0	0	0	0	0	0	0	15	0
Welwyn Garden City	2022–23	Southern League Division One Central	2	0	0	0	0	0	0	0	2	0
Potters Bar Town	2022–23	Isthmian League Premier Division	2	0	0	0	0	0	1	0	3	0
Walthamstow	2023–24	Isthmian League Division One North	12	0	0	0	0	0	3	0	15	0
Career total			407	0	11	0	0	0	38	0	456	0
