= Gareth Waite =

English footballer

Personal information
- Date of birth: 16 February 1986 (age 40)
- Place of birth: Thornaby-on-Tees, England
- Position: Midfielder

Senior career*
Years	Team	Apps	(Gls)
?–2010	Spennymoor Town		
2010–2011	Darlington	19	(1)
2011–?	Spennymoor Town		
2013–?	Thornaby Jolly Farmers		
- * Club domestic league appearances and goals as of 09:05, 15 December 2010 (UTC)

Gareth Waite (born 16 February 1986) is an English footballer who played in the Football League for Darlington. He joined that club from Northern Football League Division One side Spennymoor Town. He is a midfielder.

== Career ==
Waite, Spennymoor Town's 2008–09 player of the year, joined Football League Two club Darlington on 15 January 2010. Darlington manager Steve Staunton expressed his gratitude to Spennymoor Town's chairman Bradley Groves and manager Jason Ainsley for allowing Waite the opportunity to play League football. Waite made his debut against Rotherham United in a 2–1 away win, and his first goal came three games later, at home to Rotherham United. Waite was employed by Staunton as a right winger, although his natural position is in the centre. Waite was released by Darlington in June 2011. He then returned to Spennymoor Town, and later played for Stockton Sunday League club Thornaby Jolly Farmers.
