= Oldbury Athletic F.C. =

Coordinates: 52°29′56.12″N 2°01′52.12″W

Oldbury Athletic
- Full name: Oldbury Athletic Football Club
- Founded: 1981
- Ground: The Oldbury Leisure Centre; Oldbury
- Chairman: Adrian Mander
- 2009–10: West Midlands (Regional) League; Premier Division, 8th (resigned)
Home colours

Oldbury Athletic F.C. was a football club based in Oldbury, England. They were established in 1981. For the 2010–11 season, they were due to be playing in the West Midlands (Regional) League Premier Division, but resigned three weeks before the start of the season and folded.

== Sources ==
- Oldbury Athletic at the Football Club History Database
