= Josh Gray (footballer) =

English footballer

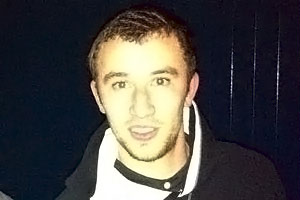
- Josh Gray, 2011

Personal information
- Full name: Joshua Ian Gray
- Date of birth: 22 July 1991 (age 35)
- Place of birth: South Shields, England
- Height: 1.83 m (6 ft 0 in)
- Position: Winger

Senior career*
Years	Team	Apps	(Gls)
2008–2011	Darlington	49	(1)
2011	→ Blyth Spartans (loan)	7	(0)
2014	Consett		
- * Club domestic league appearances and goals

Joshua Ian Gray (born 22 July 1991) is an English footballer who last played as a winger for Northern Premier League Division One East club Consett.

== Career ==
=== Football ===
Gray made his debut for Darlington in an FA Cup first-round game with Droylsden on 8 November 2008, as a late substitute. The game finished 0–0. He made his league debut four months later as one of four teenagers among the squad for a 1–0 victory against Notts County at the Darlington Arena, one week after the club entered administration. His first league goal came in April 2010 in a 2–1 League Two victory against Burton Albion at the Pirelli Stadium. On 11 February 2011, Gray joined Blyth Spartans on a month-long loan. Gray was released by Darlington in June 2011. Since 2013/14 he has played for Consett AFC.

=== Doctorate ===
Following on from his football career Gray took an access course at Gateshead College and went onto study Biomedical Science at Northumbria University where he gained a BSc. Upon receiving his degree, Gray undertook a PhD in immunology at the University of Glasgow in the laboratory of Dr. Megan MacLeod. His thesis entitled "Molecular Mechanisms of Antigen-specific Memory CD4 T Cell Tolerance and the Implications for Tolerogenic Therapy" was successfully defended on 7 June 2019. Upon receiving his doctorate Gray moved to New York City with his wife to undertake postdoctoral research at Columbia University.
