= Nathan Mulligan =

English footballer

Personal information
- Full name: Nathan Michael Mulligan
- Date of birth: 15 September 1986 (age 40)
- Place of birth: Middlesbrough, England
- Height: 5 ft 10 in (1.78 m)
- Position: Midfielder

Team information
- Current team: Stockton Town

Youth career
- –: Middlesbrough

Senior career*
Years	Team	Apps	(Gls)
2004–2009	Norton & Stockton Ancients		
2009–2010	Darlington	16	(1)
2010–2011	Norton & Stockton Ancients		
2011–2014	Whitby Town		
2014–2015	Guisborough Town		
2015–????	Marske United	43	(18)
2017	Billingham Synthonia	12	(2)
2017–2024	Stockton Town	228	(52)
- * Club domestic league appearances and goals as of 10:30, 3 November 2024 (UTC)

Nathan Michael Mulligan (born 15 September 1986) is an English former footballer who played for Stockton Town as a midfielder. He is now part of the club's management team.

== Career ==
Born in Middlesbrough, Mulligan is a former scholar at Middlesbrough's Academy whose progress was halted when he contracted a form of cancer. He made a full recovery but failed to make the first team squad and left to the club to join Norton & Stockton Ancients.

In October 2009 he signed for Darlington and made his league debut in a 2–1 away defeat to Hereford United on 31 October 2009.

He was released by the club following their relegation from League 2, along with 13 other players.

After playing for Whitby Town and Guisborough Town, he signed for Marske United in 2015. He subsequently moved on to Billingham Synthonia before signing for Stockton Town in July 2017. He played for the club until 2024, making 228 appearances and scoring 52 goals for the club during that time. In 2024, Mulligan retired from playing and accepted a job in Stockton Town's management team.
