= Patrick Deane (footballer) =

Scottish footballer

Personal information
- Full name: Patrick Martin Deane
- Date of birth: 16 April 1990 (age 36)
- Place of birth: Perth, Scotland
- Height: 6 ft 3 in (1.91 m)
- Position: Striker

Youth career
- –2009: Hibernian

Senior career*
Years	Team	Apps	(Gls)
2009	Montrose	1	(0)
2010	Darlington	10	(0)
2010–2011	Arbroath	5	(0)
2011–2012	Jeanfield Swifts		
- * Club domestic league appearances and goals as of 18 September 2011

Patrick Martin Deane (born 16 April 1990) is a Scottish footballer. Deane came through the youth system at Scottish Premier League side Hibernian, but was released in 2009. He then made 10 appearances in the Football League for Darlington, but was again released in 2010.

== Career ==
Deane played in the youth and reserve teams for Hibernian, and was part of the side that won a youth league and cup double in 2009. Deane was one of seven players, including David Wotherspoon and Kurtis Byrne, who were given senior contracts by the club in March 2009. Towards the end of the summer 2009 transfer window, Deane was released by Hibs without making an appearance for the first team, after new manager John Hughes decided that Deane, David van Zanten and Jonatan Johansson were surplus to his requirements. Deane then played as a trialist for Montrose in a Scottish Football League match against Berwick Rangers a month later.

English League Two club Darlington signed Deane in mid-January 2010 on a deal until the end of the 2009–10 season. He made his debut for Darlington on 19 January against Rotherham United, coming on as a substitute in the game, which ended in a 2–1 win for his new club. Deane made ten league appearances before he and 13 other players were released by the club at the end of the season following their relegation from League Two.

Deane returned to Scottish football in October 2010 when he signed for Third Division club Arbroath in October 2010. He joined the club at the same time as Ross Chisholm, another Hibernian youth product.

On 16 September 2011 it was announced that Deane had joined Junior club Jeanfield Swifts.
