= Thomas Ross (minister) =

Scottish preacher (1614–1679)

Personal life
- Born: 1614
- Died: 1679 (aged 64–65)

Religious life
- Religion: Christianity
- School: Presbyterianism

Thomas Ross (1614-1679) was a Scottish preacher. A supporter of the Scottish Reformation, he refused to follow the episcopal church of the king of England, and was expelled from his church post in 1662. He continued to preach as a Covenanter and was arrested in 1675; two years later he was released on bail and he died at home a few months later.

== Life ==
Ross, of Nether Pitkerrie, was born about 1614. He was the son of George Ross of Nether Pitkerrie. He continued in Kincardine after the establishment of prelacy and owed his leaving to a meeting with John M'Gilligan.

On the roll of ministers ejected after the Restoration the name of Ross appears amongst the “outed” in the Presbytery of Dingwall. Along with some other recusant Presbyterians, he took a warm interest in field preaching until the summer of 1675, when he was arrested under a warrant, issued to the Earl of Moray, commanding him “to execute the laws against the keepers of conventicles in the county of Moray and neighbouring places.” Wodrow relates, (perhaps mistakenly and perhaps misleading Crighton), that after undergoing terms of imprisonment at Nairn and Inverness, Ross made his acquaintance with the dungeons of the Bass Rock. Dickson suggests that he probably died there. Wodrow also mentions him as being a prisoner at Tain on the same page as other Bass prisoners. Porteous says that "after the release of Robert Gillespie, Alexander Peden had been sole prisoner of the Bass for a year and four months, when in the month of May, 1676, two ministers were brought thither for his occasional relief. These were Mr Thomas Ross, a minister from Ross-shire, and Mr Alexander Forrester, minister of St. Mungo, in Annandale." Alexander Smellie quotes him as uncomplaining as he neared his death.

He was admitted to Kincardine in Sutherland before 28 August 1655. He was deprived by an Act of Parliament and Decreet of Privy Council on 1 October 1662, and went to Tain, where he is said to have made himself useful in the work of the Gospel. He was in Moray in 1669 where he was accused of keeping conventicles, and was imprisoned in 1675 in the Tolbooth of Nairn. In 1676 he was removed to the prison of Tain and confined till 9 October 1677, when he was liberated on finding caution for 2000 merks to appear when called upon.

He died in his own house in Tain 13 January 1679. He had been suffering from a painful disease of the throat which kept him from even saying grace for a long period of time. James Fraser of Brea dedicated his Memoirs to him as a "singularly pious minister." He was summoned to appear before representatives of the Privy Council in January 1685.

== Lilias Dunbar ==
Lilias Dunbar lost her parents early in life and was brought up by Sir Hugh Campbell. Anderson relates that Lilias Dunbar (later Mrs Campbell) visited Thomas Ross, along with Jean Taylor, while he was sick in prison. She had a religious experience under Ross' ministry two years previously at Kilraick Old Town (Kilravock) pg 320. In the summer of the year 1679, in the twenty-second year of her age, Lilias Dunbar was married to Mr. Alexander Campbell of Torrich, a young gentleman descended, like herself, from the family of Calder, and a cousin of her own. The union was, however, formed by Mr. John Stewart, who, at the restoration, was minister of a parish in the presbytery of Deer, in the synod of Aberdeen, but who was ejected for nonconformity.

Hew Scott has written that Thomas Ross married Lilias Dunbar, and had sons: Alexander of Nether Pitkerrie, minister of Fearn; and George, minister of Kincardine.

== Bibliography ==
- Wodrow's History vol. i pg 329
- Wodrow's History, vol. ii. p. 284, 356–357
- Wodrow's History, vol. iii. 437
- Anderson's The Bass Rock, 97–105
- Phillimore's The Bass Rock, 98
- Brodie's Diary
- Crichton's Life of Blackader (cites a non-existent Wodrow source)
- Memoirs of Mrs Ross, 33.
