= James Macaulay =

James Macaulay may refer to:

- James Macaulay (Canadian physician) (died 1822)
- James Macaulay (editor) (1817–1902), 19th century Scottish physician, journalist and anti-vivisectionist
- James Macaulay (preacher), 17th century Scottish preacher and prisoner on the Bass Rock
- James Buchanan Macaulay (1793–1859), lawyer and judge in colonial Canada
- James Macaulay (footballer) (1922–2000), Scottish footballer
- Jim Macaulay, musician

== See also ==
- James McAuley (1917–1976), academic and poet
- Jimmy McAuley (1901–?), Irish footballer
- James Macauley (1889–1945), Irish footballer
- James McAulay (1860–1943), Scottish footballer
