= James Mitchell (Covenanter) =

English covenator and attempted assassin

Personal life
- Died: 18 January 1678 Grassmarket, Edinburgh
- Education: University of Edinburgh

Religious life
- Religion: Christianity
- School: Presbyterianism
- Profession: Tobacconist

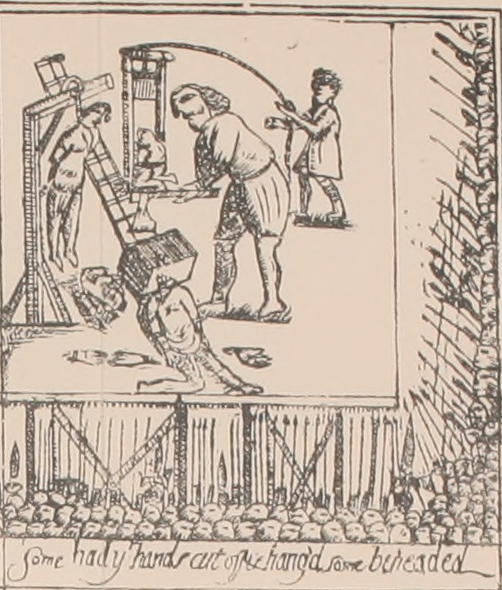
Some had hands cut off & hanged, some beheaded

James Mitchell or James Mitchel, (d. 18 January 1678), was a religious covenanter who tried to assassinate Archbishop James Sharp.

Mitchell is a central character in James Robertson's historical novel, The Fanatic.

== Early life ==
Mitchell was the son of "obscure parents" in Midlothian. He graduated in Divinity at Edinburgh University on 9 July 1656, and at the same time signed the National Covenant and the Solemn League and Covenant. He attached himself to the party of remonstrator presbyterians, and studied popular divinity under David Dickson. He was refused a position by the presbytery of Dalkeith on the grounds of insufficiency, and appears to have become ‘a preacher, but no actual minister,’ in or near Edinburgh. In 1661 he was recommended to some ministers in Galloway by Robert Traill, a minister in Greyfriars Kirk in Edinburgh, as suitable for teaching in a school or as private tutor.

He entered the house of the Laird of Dundas as domestic chaplain and tutor to his children, but was dismissed for immoral conduct. Returning to Edinburgh he made the acquaintance of Major Weir, who procured for him the post of chaplain in a ‘fanatical family, the lady whereof was niece to Sir Archibald Johnston of Warriston.

== Armed rising, flight and return ==
He resigned his post in November 1666 in order to join the rising of the covenanters in the west, at Ayr.

He was in Edinburgh on 28 November, when the rebels were defeated at Pentland, but was pronounced guilty of treason in a proclamation of 4 December 1666, and on 1 October 1667 was excluded from the pardon granted to those engaged in the rising.

About four to six weeks after the defeat, he went over to Flanders on mercantile transactions, where he joined a cousin, a factor in Rotterdam. He stayed there around 9 months, and then returned to Scotland in a Dutch vessel, bringing with him a cargo of goods for sale. While abroad, he had opportunities of meeting and conversing with Mr John Livingstone, and the other ministers who had been banished for their adherence to Presbytery.

His attempt upon the life of Archbishop Sharp was made not many months after his arrival from the continent.

After wandering in England and Ireland he returned to Edinburgh in 1668. There he married, and opened a shop for the sale of tobacco and spirits.

== Assassination attempt ==
Mitchell became convinced that Archbishop James Sharp was the sole barrier that stood between him and the clemency of the Government; and, also that this recreant was the "prime cause" of all the trouble in Scotland. Mitchell therefore made an attempt at the assassination of the bishop.

He was lodging in a house on the Cowgate with his later infamous friend, Major Weir and Weir's sister, Grizel. He was aware that Bishop Sharp lived nearby on Blackfriars Wynd. On 9 July 1668 he tracked down the Bishop who was in his coach on the Royal Mile at the head of the Wynd. He fired a pistol into the coach, but instead of hitting Sharp, hit his friend, Bishop Andrew Honeyman, bishop of Orkney, in the arm.

Mitchell then ran down Niddry's Wynd on the opposite side of the road, without opposition, and escaped.

== Apprehension ==
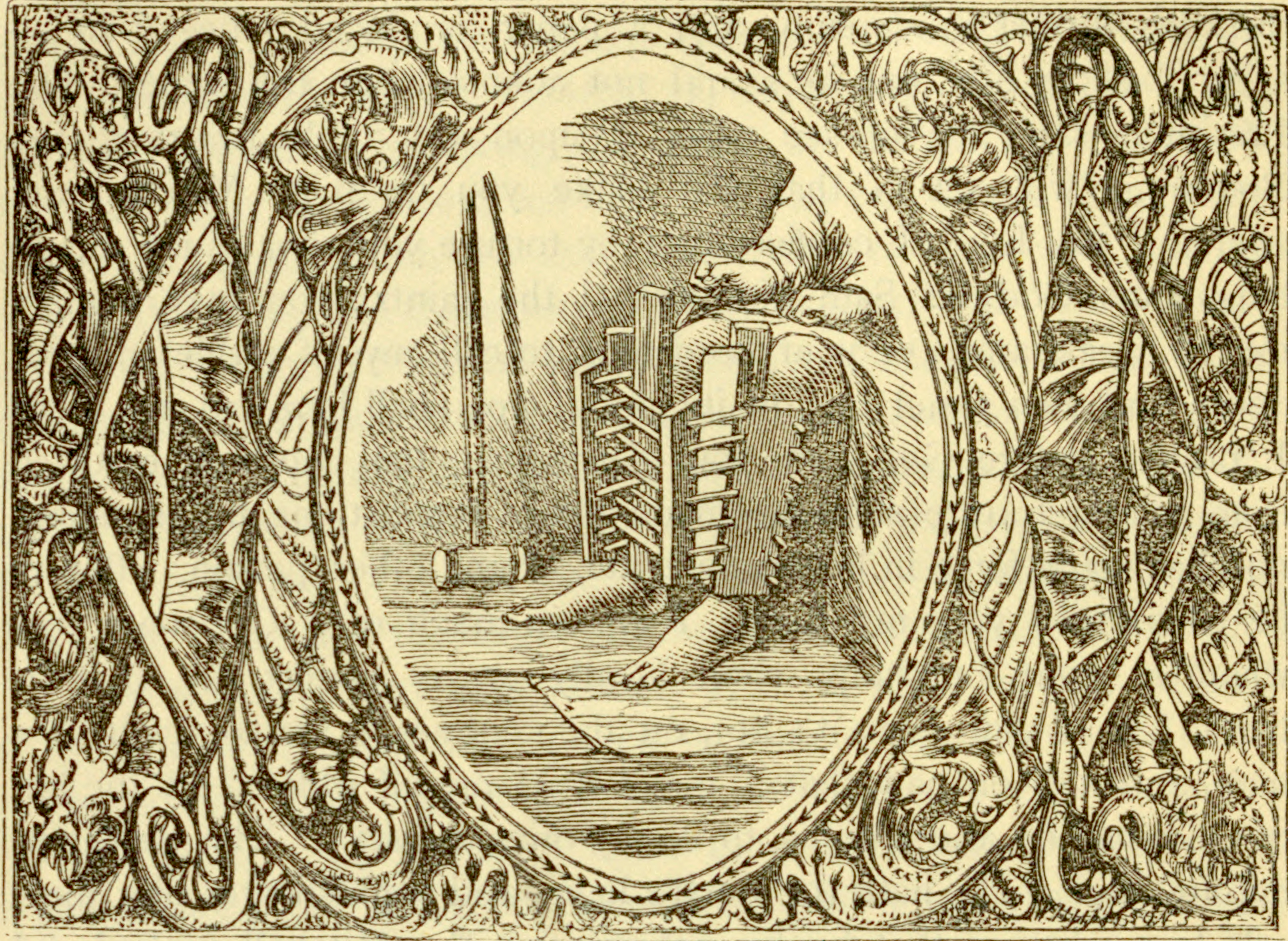
The Boots from Scots Worthies

Early in 1674 he was recognised in the street by Sharp, whose brother, Sir William Sharp, obtained a confession from him, after the archbishop had pledged himself that no harm should come to him. But he was imprisoned at the Bass Rock, and, at the instigation of Sharp, brought before the council on 10 February 1674. He made a full confession on 12 February on receiving a promise of his life. Mitchell was indicted before the High Court of Justiciary and sentenced to have his right hand cut off by the common executioner, at the "Mercat Cross" of Edinburgh.

Indicted afresh, before the High Court in 1675, for his participation in the Pentland Rising and the attempt on the Archbishop's life, he retracted his Confession and pleaded "Not Guilty." Having no other proof in support of the latter charge except his Confession (and that having been recanted) the Court ordered the "torture of the Boot," with the view that he might be constrained anew to adhere to it. However, no amount of torture could induce him to incriminate himself; and he was accordingly sent to the Tolbooth Prison where he lay until the beginning of 1677, when he was transferred to the Bass Rock.

On 6 March the council framed an act, in which they declared themselves free of any promise made. On 25 March Mitchell was again brought before the court, but there being no evidence against him beyond the confession, since retracted, the lords of justiciary deserted the diet, with the consent of the lord advocate, Sir John Nisbet, Lord Dirleton. Mitchell was then returned to the Tolbooth and afterwards removed to the Bass Rock. He was sent there along with James Fraser of Brea and James Drummond. The attempted murder was an act that met with no sympathy from the great body of the Covenanters, who rather repudiated everything approaching to private revenge and assassination.

On 18 January 1677 he again in the presence of a committee of justices, of which Linlithgow was chairman, denied his confession. A further attempt was made on 22 January with the same result, despite a threat of the ‘boots.’ On 24 January, in the Parliament House, he was examined under torture as to his connection with the rebellion of 1666 This accusation he also denied, and reminded those present that there were two other James Mitchells in Midlothian. The torture and questioning continued till the prisoner fainted when he was carried back to the Tolbooth.

== Final trial ==
In December 1677 the council ordered criminal proceedings against him for the attempted assassination of the archbishop. On 7 January the trial commenced. He was ably defended by Sir George Lockhart, Lord Carnwath and John Elies. His confession and the testimonies of Bishops Sharp and Honeyman were the main evidence against him. Most of the discussion focussed upon the "promise of life" by the Bishop.

Rothes swore to having seen Mitchell sign his confession, which was countersigned by himself. But both he and the archbishop denied that the promise of life had been given. Mitchell's counsel produced a copy of the Act of Council of 12 March 1674, in which his confession under promise of life was recorded, but a request that the books of the council might be produced was refused. The trial was remarkable for the number of witnesses of high station. Mitchell was judged guilty.

The following day, 10 January, sentence was passed. The death sentence adjudged him "to be taken to the Grassmarket of Edinburgh, upon Friday, the 18th day of January instant, betwixt two and four o’clock in the afternoon, and there to be hanged on a gibbet till he be dead, and all his moveable goods and gear to be escheat (confiscated) and inbrought to His Majesty’s use." It appears that, after the passing of this sentence, the unprincipled Lauderdale was ill-at-ease. He had great searchings of conscience and was anxious to obtain a reprieve for Mitchell, in the hope that the King might grant him his life. But Sharp was inexorable and insisted that the "extreme penalty" should be inflicted, alleging that for "favour to be shown to such an assassin was, upon the matter, to expose his person to any man who would attempt to murder him." "Then," said Lauderdale, with a profane and heartless jest, "let Mitchell glorify God in the Grassrmarket." (Dickson pg 224). He was hanged, as proposed, on the afternoon of 18 January 1678.

Halton was eventually indicted for the perjury on 28 July 1681, the evidence against him being two letters that he had written on 10 and 12 February 1674 to the Earl of Kincardine [see Bruce, Alexander, second Earl], in which he gave an account of Mitchell's confession, ‘upon assurance of his life.’ The letters are printed in Wodrow, ii. 248-9.

Mitchell is described as ‘a lean, hollow-cheeked man, of a truculent countenance’ (Ravillac Redivivus, p. 11). He himself attributed his attempt on Sharp as ‘ane impulse of the spirit of God’ (Kirkton, History of the Church of Scotland, p. 387).

== Family ==
Mitchell was married. His son James, who graduated at the University of Edinburgh on 11 Nov. 1698, was licensed by the presbytery there on 26 July 1704, ordained on 5 April 1710, and became minister of Dunnotar in the same year. He was summoned to appear before the justices of the peace on 24 March 1713 to answer for the exercise of church discipline in the session. He died on 26 June 1734.

== Bibliography ==
- The fullest account of Mitchell's attempt at assassination and trials is given in Wodrow's History of the Sufferings of the Church of Scotland, ed. Burns, ii. 115-17, 248-52, 454-73.
- A prejudiced account, entitled Ravillac Redivivus, being a Narrative of the late Tryal, was published anonymously in 1678, 4to. It was the work of George Hickes [q. v.], who, as chaplain to Lauderdale, accompanied him to Scotland in May 1677, and was in Edinburgh at the time of Mitchell's trial.
- Somers's Tracts, viii., contains a reprint of the work with notes (pp. 510–53).
- A pamphlet entitled ‘The Spirit of Fanaticism exemplified’ is an amplified version of the work, published by Curll in 1710.
- John Howie's Biographia Scoticana: Or, a Brief Historical Account of the Most Eminent Scots Worthies, 1775 pp. 329-330
- Stephen's Life of Sharp, pp. 383, 458-61
- Omond's Lord Advocates of Scotland, i. 192, 214-15
- Sir James Turner's Memoirs (Bannatyne Club), pp. 166, 180
- Kirkton's Church of Scotland, pp. 383–8
- Burnet's Hist of his own Time, ii. 125-32, 298-9
- Cobbett's State Trials, vol. vi. cols. 1207-66
- Mackenzie's Memoirs, pp. 326–7
- Edinburgh Graduates, pp. 77, 161
- Scott's Fasti Eccles. Scot. vol. iii. pt. ii. pp. 861–2
