= John Spreul =

John Spreul may refer to:

- John Spreul (apothecary), apothecary in Glasgow, Scotland
- John Spreul (town clerk), town clerk in Glasgow, Scotland
