= Spreul =

Spreul is a surname. Notable people with the surname include:

- John Spreul (apothecary) (1646–1722), in the 17th century in Glasgow
- John Spreul (town clerk) (1616–1690), town clerk in Glasgow
