= William Spence (schoolmaster) =

Religious life
- Religion: Christianity
- School: Presbyterianism
- Profession: Schoolmaster

William Spence was a Scottish schoolmaster in Fife. In the month of May 1685, he was summoned to appear before the Privy Council. Phillimore says he "had committed the offence of teaching his pupils the doctrines of Presbyterianism, and attending the forbidden conventicles." Dickson says he "was committed to the Bass where he remained for more than a year, when he petitioned for his liberty on the ground of ill-health." He was sent to the Bass Rock at the same time as Peter Kid and had fourteen months of imprisonment. On the 20th of July 1686, “My Lords ” agreed to his release “upon his finding caution to compear before the Council, when cited; and, in the meantime, to live peaceably and not to keep a school, under a penalty of five thousand merks, Scots money, in case of failure.” He was liberated along with John Greg. After he was set free he had to periodically reappear before the Council to retain his liberty.

== Not to be confused with ==
William Spence secretary to the Earl of Argyle who was tortured with the boot.
