= John Campbell (17th-century minister) =

Religious life
- Religion: Christianity
- School: Presbyterianism

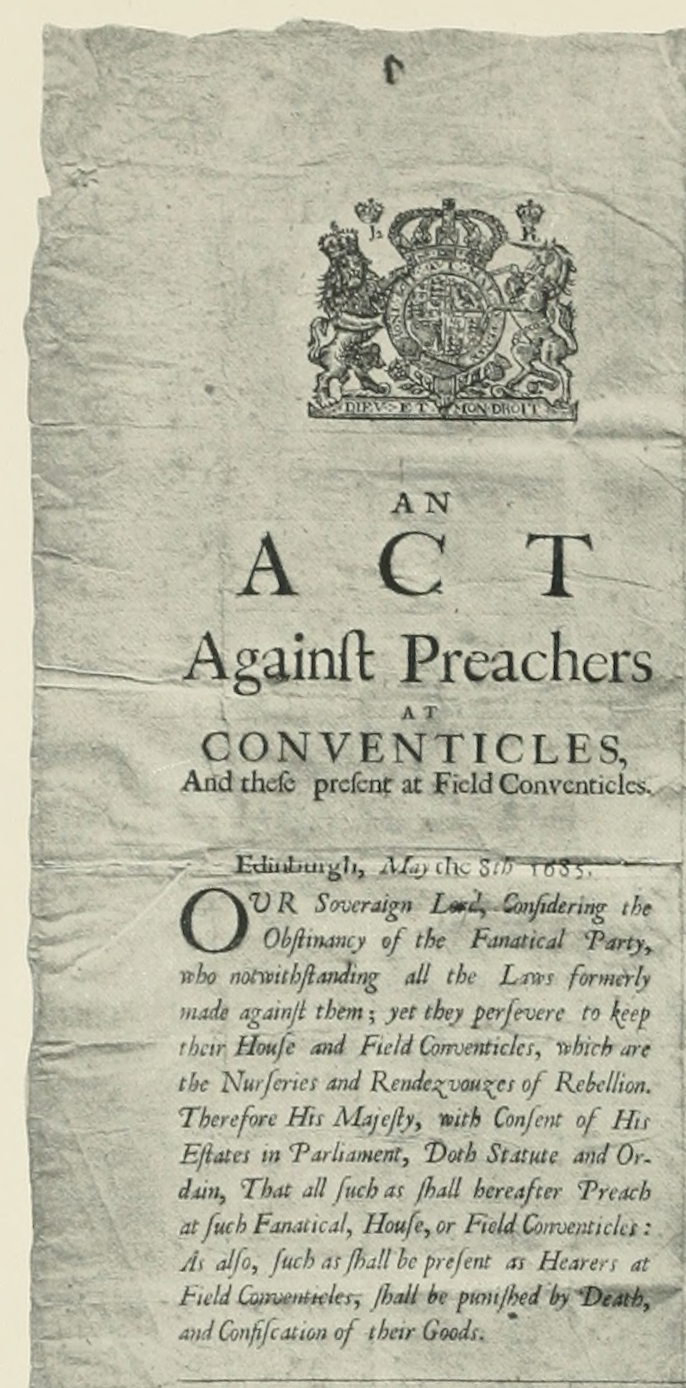
The Scottish Parliament on 8th May, 1685, have recorded the following : Our sovereign Lord, considering the obstinacy of the fanatical party who, notwithstanding all the laws formerly made against them, still keep their house and field conventicles, which are the nurseries and rendezvouses of rebellion; therefore His Majesty, with consent of Parliament, ordains that all such persons who shall hereafter preach at such house or field conventicles, also those who shall be present as hearers, shall be punished by death and confiscation of their goods.

John Campbell, sometimes spelled Campble was a 17th-century minister of the gospel.

He was charged in an Edinburgh court for attending a service of worship at the house of James Campbell (vintner) and Thomas Waddell (lorimer) during the hours of Sunday morning worship. He was imprisoned on the Bass Rock on the Firth of Forth in Haddingtonshire on 31 May 1678. This may have been the date of his sentence since one source has his imprisonment starting in June 1678. The duration of his incarceration is uncertain.
