= James Fithie =

Scottish religious dissident

Personal life
- Born: ca. 1636
- Died: 25 December 1689
- Education: University of Edinburgh

Religious life
- Religion: Christianity
- School: Presbyterianism

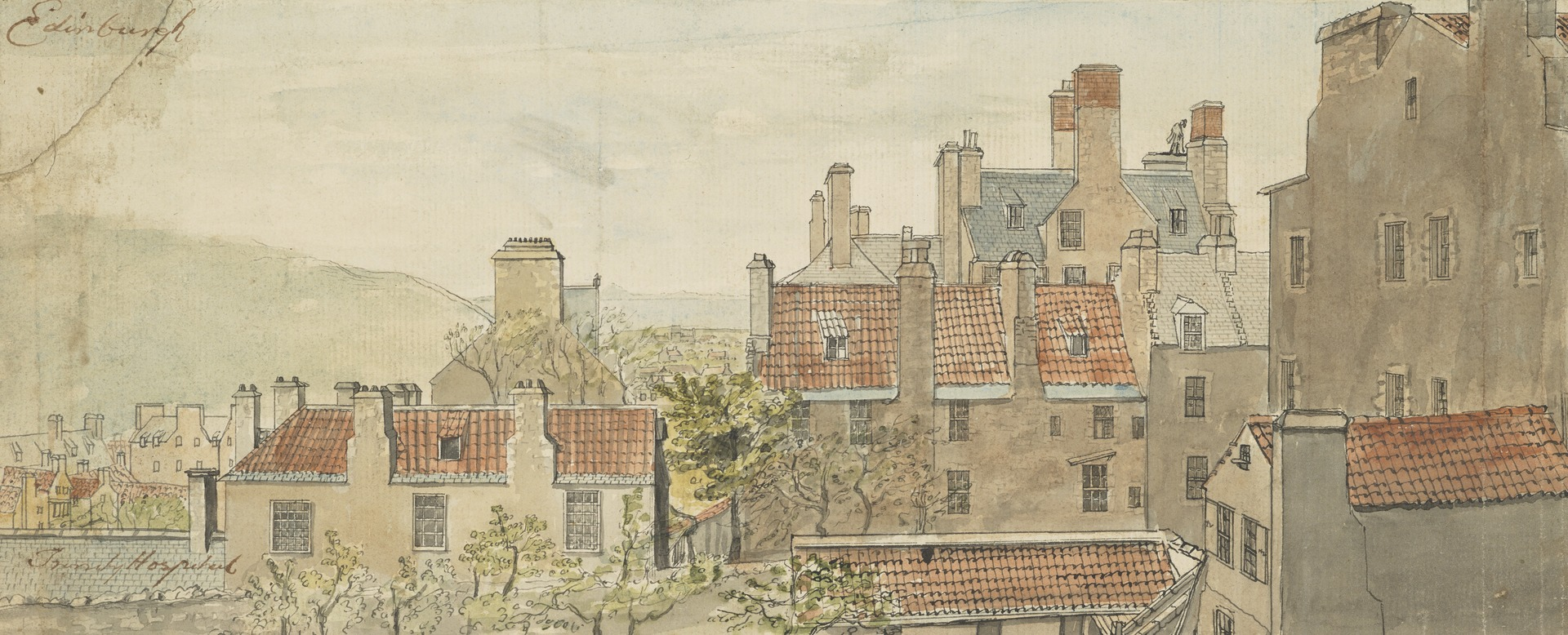
Trinity Hospital, Edinburgh

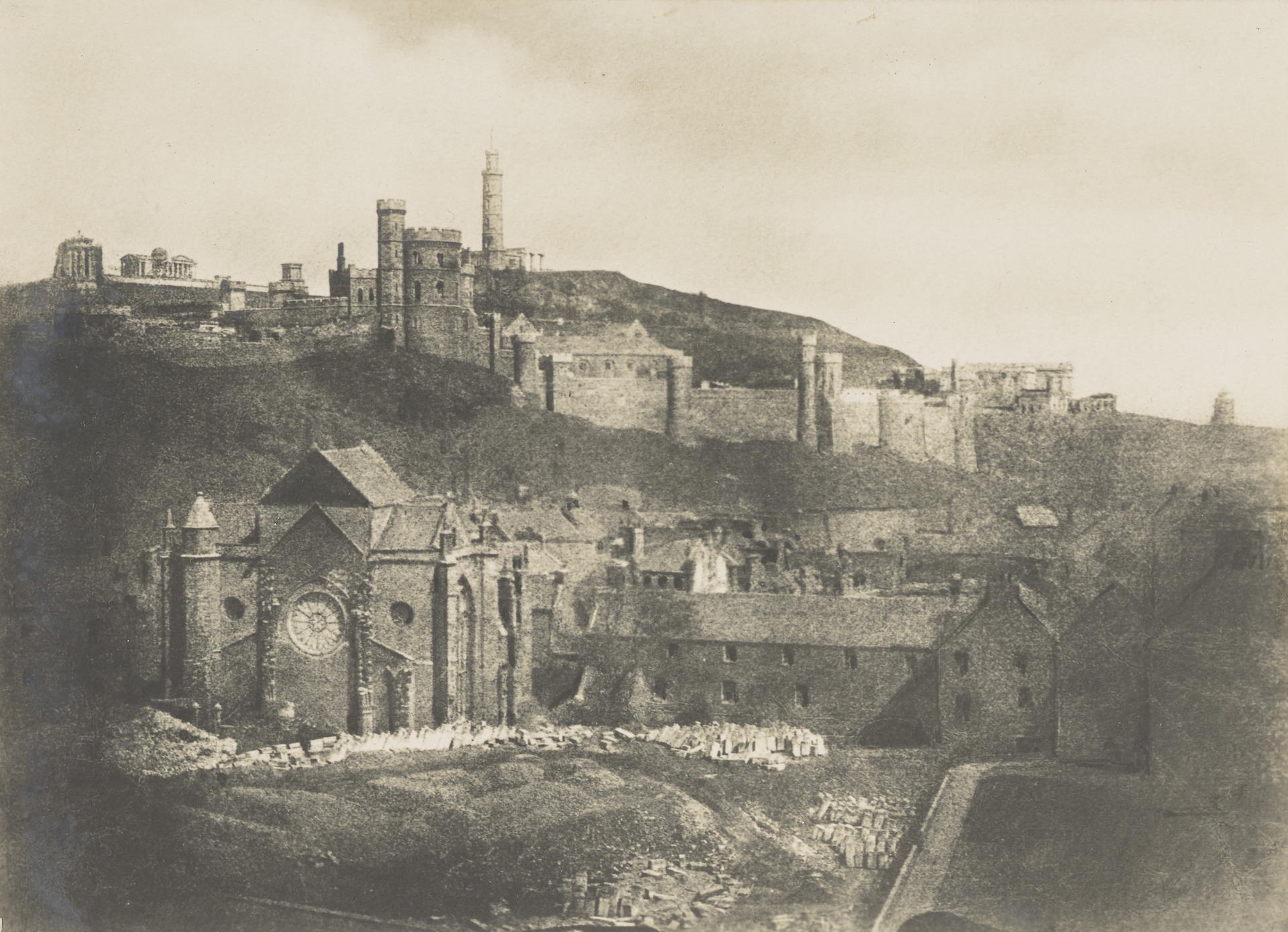
Trinity College Chapel and Hospital by D. O. Hill and R. Adamson

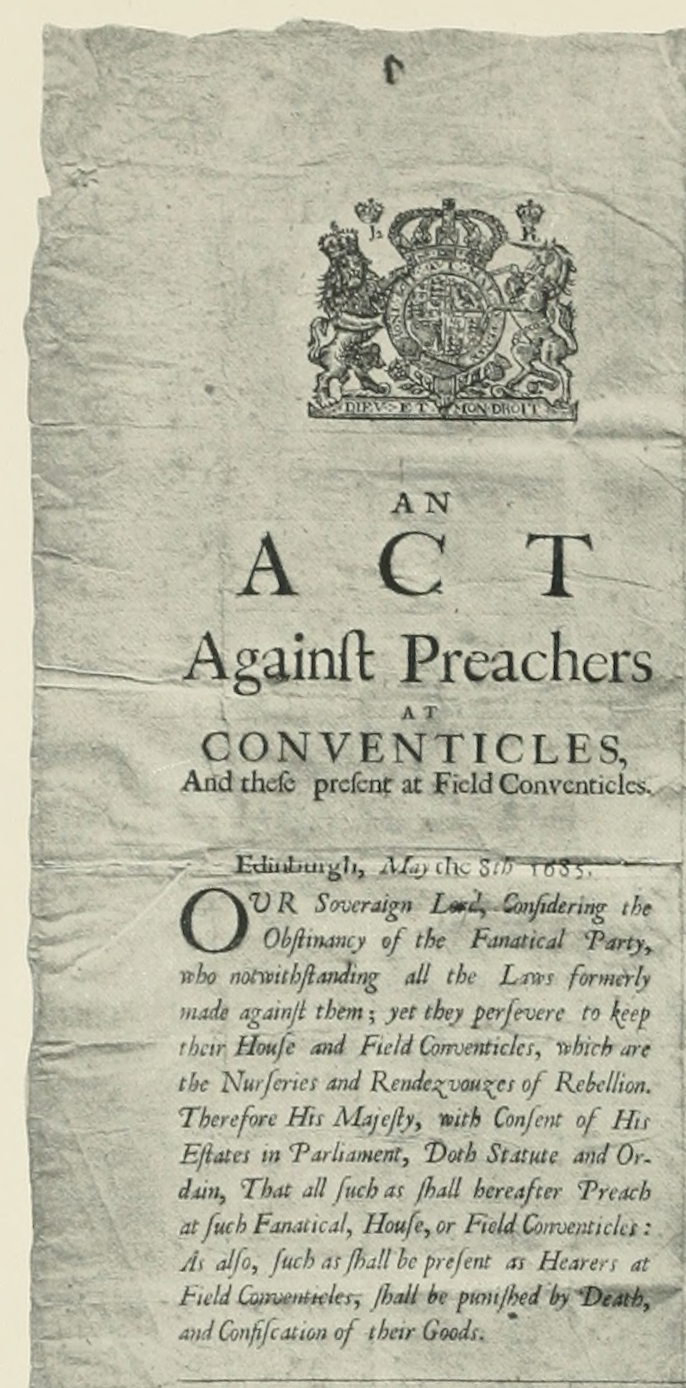
The Scottish Parliament on 8 May 1685, have recorded the following : Our sovereign Lord, considering the obstinacy of the fanatical party who, notwithstanding all the laws formerly made against them, still keep their house and field conventicles, which are the nurseries and rendezvouses of rebellion; therefore His Majesty, with consent of Parliament, ordains that all such persons who shall hereafter preach at such house or field conventicles, also those who shall be present as hearers, shall be punished by death and confiscation of their goods.

James Fithie (ca. 1636 - 25 December 1689) was a chaplain at Trinity Hospital in Edinburgh. He was imprisoned on the Bass Rock for about a year between 1685 and 1686.

== Early life ==
James Fithie graduated from the University of Edinburgh with an MA on 9 July 1656. He was made a prisoner for holding conventicles, and ordered to be liberated from the Edinburgh Tolbooth 4 July 1679. Fithie was chaplain of Trinity Hospital, Edinburgh, a situation to which he was elected by the Town Council on 20 January 1671. He had attended his own parish church, and received baptism for his children from the regular incumbent of the parish. But his sympathies being on the side of the persecuted Presbyterians, he had given evidence of this in several ways, and on various occasions. On this account he was apprehended, and lay in one of the jails of Edinburgh for some time previous to July 1679, when he was released. He was again arrested about the beginning of the year 1685, and imprisoned in the Bass in April. He was allowed liberty to walk on the rock, with an allowance of eightpence a day, on account of his poverty, by an order of 19 September 1685.

== Release ==
He made a petition to the Council after his wife became sick and some of his children died. He was released in March 1686 by an order of the Council, in consideration of his own ill health, and the afflicted condition of his family. After he was set free he had to periodically reappear before the Council to retain his liberty. He was admitted to Peebles 17 November 1687. He died 25 December 1689, aged about 53.

== Other names ==
Wodrow, in his History, (vol. iii. p. 151,) calls him by mistake " James Forthie." This has led Dr Crichton, in his list of the Bass prisoners annexed to his Memoirs of Mr John Blackadder, erroneously to suppose that the person whom Wodrow calls in that place " James Forthie," is different from " James Futhy," whose imprisonment in the Bass in 1685, is recorded by that historian in vol iv. p. 215. It is the same person who is spoken of in both places. Crichton is also mistaken in representing "James Forthie", or more correctly "James Fithie", as imprisoned in the Bass in 1679. That he was not imprisoned there at that time, is evident from what is stated in M'Crie's Appendix, No. I. pg 379. Porteous calls him James Fithy.

== Family ==
He married Elizabeth Reid, who survived him, and had children: Elizabeth, served heir 3 November 1691 (married, pro. 20 November 1691, John Elliot, writer, Edinburgh: Edin. Horn., 26 December 1693).

== Bibliography ==
- Wodrow's Hist., iii., iv.
- Crichton's Memoirs of Blackadder
- Inq. Bet. Gen., 7185
- Dickson's Emeralds Chased in Gold
