= Sir George Campbell =

17th-century statesman

Sir George Campbell Bt
- Title: of Cessnock, Lord Justice Clerk

Personal life
- Born: around 1639 Cessnock, Ayrshire
- Died: 1704

Religious life
- Religion: Christianity
- School: Presbyterianism

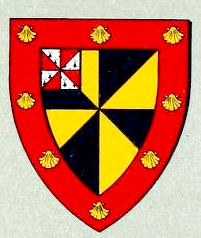
arms of Sir George Campbell of Cessnock

Sir George Campbell of Cessnock in Ayrshire was a 17th-century statesman. His lineage was from the Campbells of Loudoun. His father was Sir Hugh Campbell and his mother was Elizabeth Campbell.

He married Anna McMouran, an heiress to an estate in Fife, in 1665.

He was tried along with his father for high treason in March 1684 for being part of the rising at Bothwell Bridge. A not proven verdict was returned but nevertheless he and his father were imprisoned on the Bass Rock on the Firth of Forth in Haddingtonshire. The order for his transport from the Tolbooth is dated 15 September 1684. It apparently took about 4 days to put into effect. He was sent at the same time as John Rae but neither he nor Rae were permitted to ride in a coach or on a horse someone provided.

In 1685 George and his father were accused of accession to the Rye House Plot. This was a plot for the assassination of Charles II and the elevation of his illegitimate son, by Lucy Walters, the Duke of Monmouth, to the throne. Although the proof failed, Parliament adjudged them guilty. Their lives were spared, but an act of attainder was taken out against them, by which their lands passed to the Crown and themselves again committed prisoners to the Bass. On 13 June 1685 notice of his forfeiture and that of his father were recorded. Both Campbells were released on 6 August 1685 but later re-arrested.

He was appointed to the posts of Lord Justice Clerk and became one of the Lord of Sessions in 1665. He was succeeded by his daughter Margaret who married Alexander Hume-Campbell in 1697.
