= James Macaulay (preacher) =

Religious life
- Religion: Christianity
- School: Presbyterianism

James Macaulay was a Presbyterian preacher. He did not have a government licence to preach. He was apprehended at Leith and sent to the Bass Rock. He was kept in confinement there for upwards of three months from 4 April – 19 July 1679.

== Preaching and imprisonment ==
James Macaulay was called a preacher by Wodrow. He was probably licensed by some of the ejected nonconforming ministers.

On 4 June, the Council authorised the Lord Chancellor to give orders to parties of that troop of horse of his Majesty's guards, under his command, to apprehend a considerable number of ministers, among whom Macaulay is included, and offer a reward of a thousand merks to such as should apprehend him. Early in the year 1679, he and Mr Robert Ross, also a preacher, and another person who was under hiding for nonconformity, were apprehended in Leith.) The Committee of Council for Public Affairs agreed that he and Ross should be sent to the Bass, and this report was approved of by the Council at their meeting on 4 April. He however continued a prisoner there only between three and four months, being liberated in July, simply upon condition of his finding security, under a certain sum, to appear before the Council when called.
