= John Greig (minister) =

Religious life
- Religion: Christianity
- School: Presbyterianism

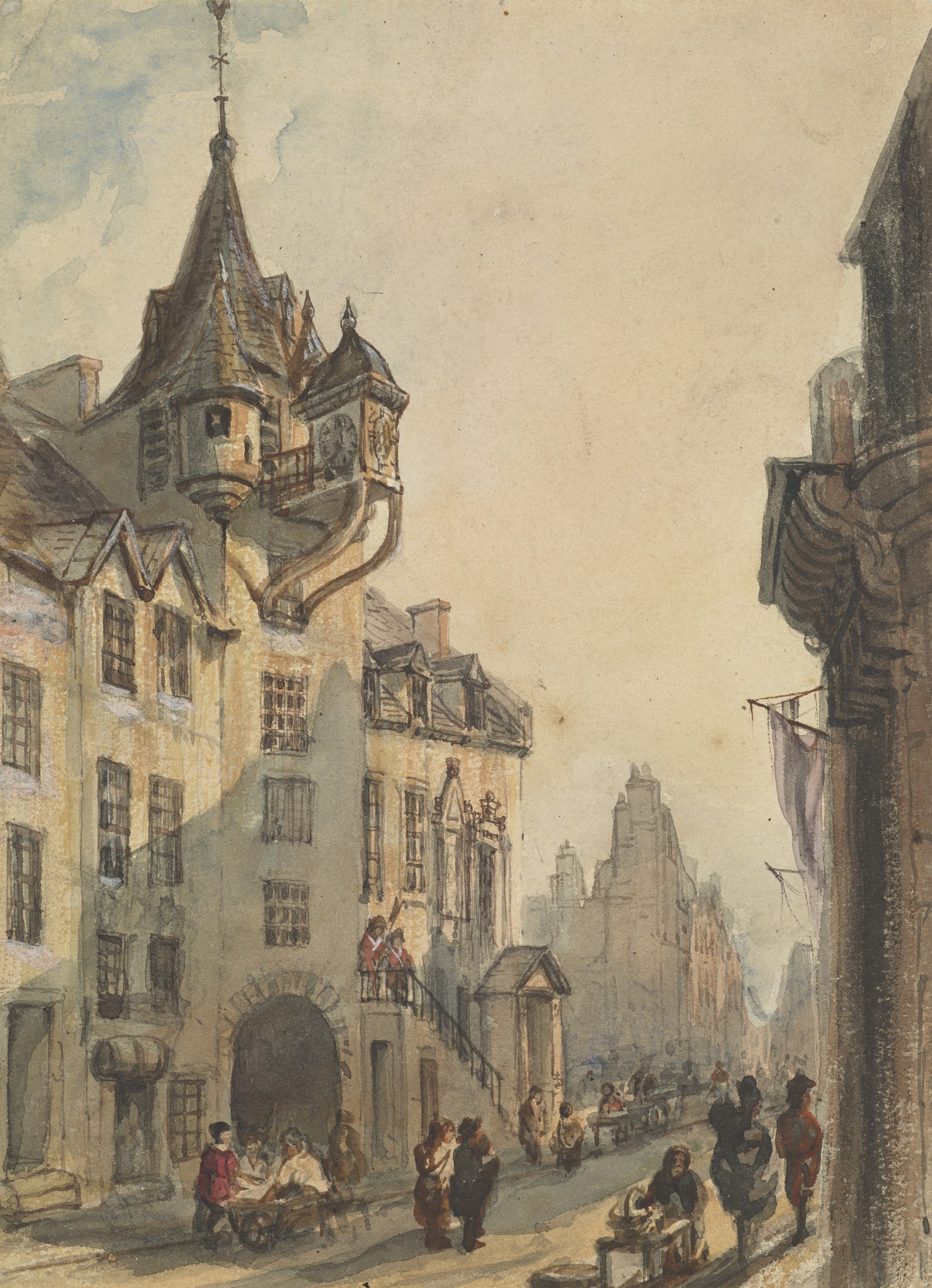
The Canongate Tolbooth, Edinburgh from the west

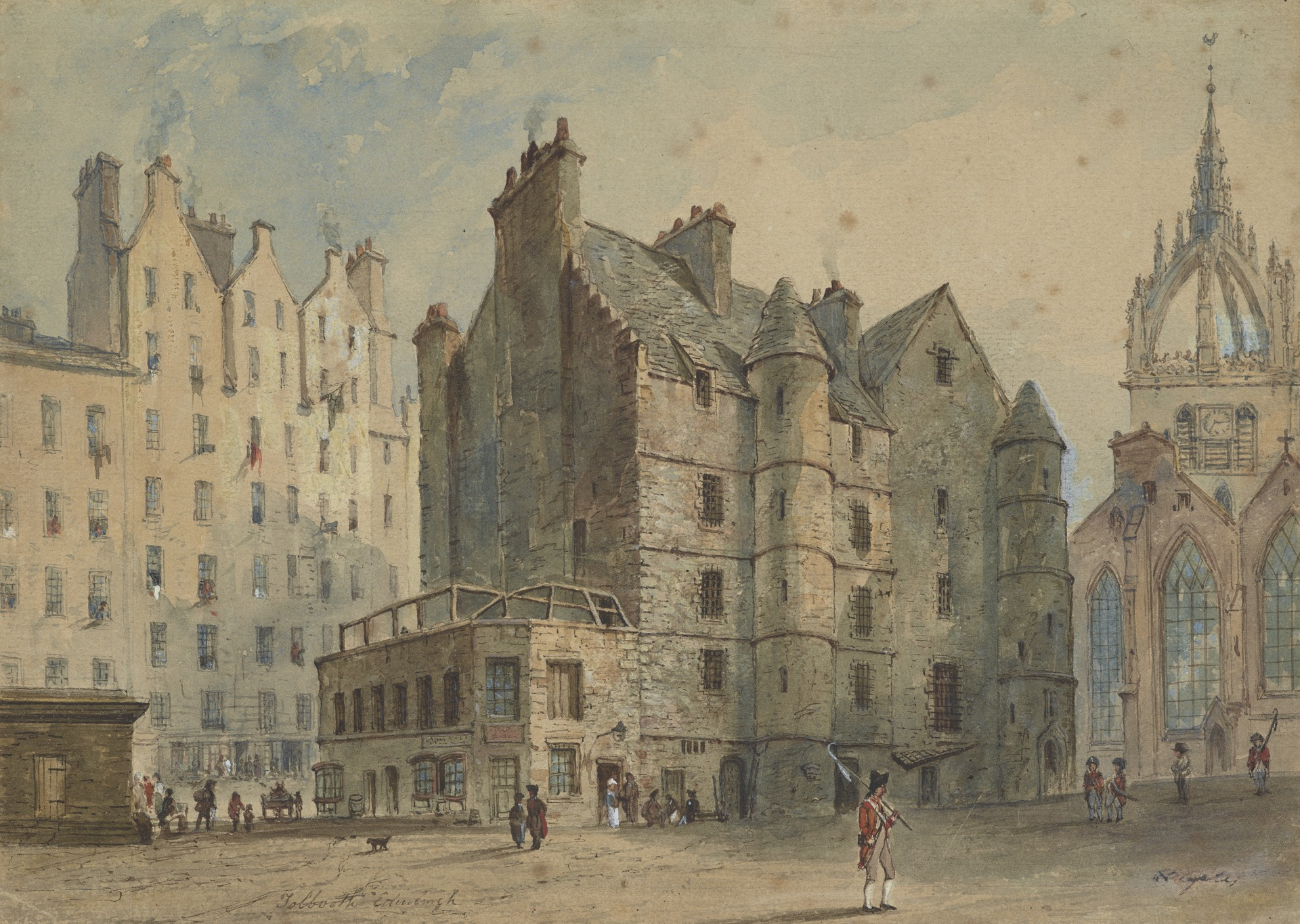
The Tolbooth (a Covenanting prison) and St. Giles Cathedral, Edinburgh

John Greig (c. 1617 – 17 May 1689) was a Presbyterian minister from Scotland.

He was the minister of Skirling, a small parish in the western side of Peeblesshire, subsequent to the year 1649. Anderson relates that "of his history while in that charge, as well as during the earlier part of his life, nothing is now known." Greig was ejected from Skirling by the Act of 1662.

Ten years later we find him incumbent of Carstairs, as one of the indulged ministers, and tied down to preach nowhere but within the bounds of that parish. With this restriction, Greig could not agree. He went "afield" and held conventicles at Boghall, Leith, and other parts. In 1675, he was apprehended, at Leith, while conducting a meeting in the house of Thomas Stark, his brother-in-law, and committed to the Tolbooth of Edinburgh. Having been brought before the Privy Council on 9 March 1675, Greig was ordered to the Bass.

Meanwhile, that sentence was not carried out, and he remained in the Tolbooth, preaching to his fellow-prisoners whenever an opportunity presented itself. Shortly after he was set at liberty on condition that he would, as an indulged minister, "live orderly", and confine his ministrations to the parish of Carstairs, under a penalty of two thousand merks, in the event of default. But, Greig again soon fell through his obligations and was present at conventicles, beyond the bounds of his parish. Summoned to compear before the Lords of Council, he failed to "show face", and was, in consequence thereof, deprived of all his ecclesiastical rights. He was, however, shortly afterwards reinstated.

For the next seven years, Greig drops out of view. But, on 8 October, we find him again in "deep waters" owing to his refusal to commemorate the Anniversary of the Restoration of Charles II. and to join in a day of National Thanksgiving for the "deliverance of His Majesty's sacred person" from the Rye-house Plot. Because of these and other acts of recalcitration, he was relegated to the Bass about the beginning of May 1685. Here he remained for about 14 months. He petitioned for release, on the score of health. The council, on 15 July, having heard and considered this petition, "grant warrant to the Lieutenant-Governor of the Isle of the Bass to set the petitioner at liberty; he, first finding caution, under the penalty of five thousand merks Scots money, to compear before the Council upon Tuesday next, the 20th instant, or that day to enter his person in prison within the Tolbooth of Edinburgh, or Canongate under the foresaid penalty in case of failure." He was liberated along with William Spence. From this time until his death—the date of which is uncertain—Greig appears to have eaten "humble pie", as he was constantly "appearing" before "My Lords" in order to ensure the continuance of his liberty.

He was present at the first meeting of ministers in the bounds of Lothian and Tweeddale on 6 July 1687, after Toleration had been granted. He died on 17 May 1689, aged about 71.

== Family ==
He married a daughter of Alexander Livingston, minister of Biggar. His wife survived him, and requiring pecuniary aid, was recommended for charity by the Presbytery of Hamilton on 18 October 1692. They had children — John; James; William, and a daughter, who married Nicol Mason, a mariner.

== Bibliography ==
Hamilton Presbytery and Edinburgh Reg. (Marriages)
