= John Rae (minister) =

English parish minister

John Rae (d. 1684) was a Scottish preacher. A supporter of the Scottish Reformation, he refused to follow the episcopal church of the King of England. He continued to preach as a Covenantor and was arrested on 4th March 1684. He was executed a few months later.

== Early life ==
He was the son of William Rae, burgess of Edinburgh. He was educated at the University of Glasgow and graduated with an M.A. in 1651.

== Career ==
At the Restoration he was minister of Symington in the Presbytery of Biggar being admitted between 4 May and 2 November 1658. He was deprived by the Act of Parliament 11th June, and of Privy Council 1 October 1662. He became one of the most zealous of the Covenanting preachers; and for eight years peregrinated the country, conducting public worship on the hillsides and in private houses.

== Arrest ==
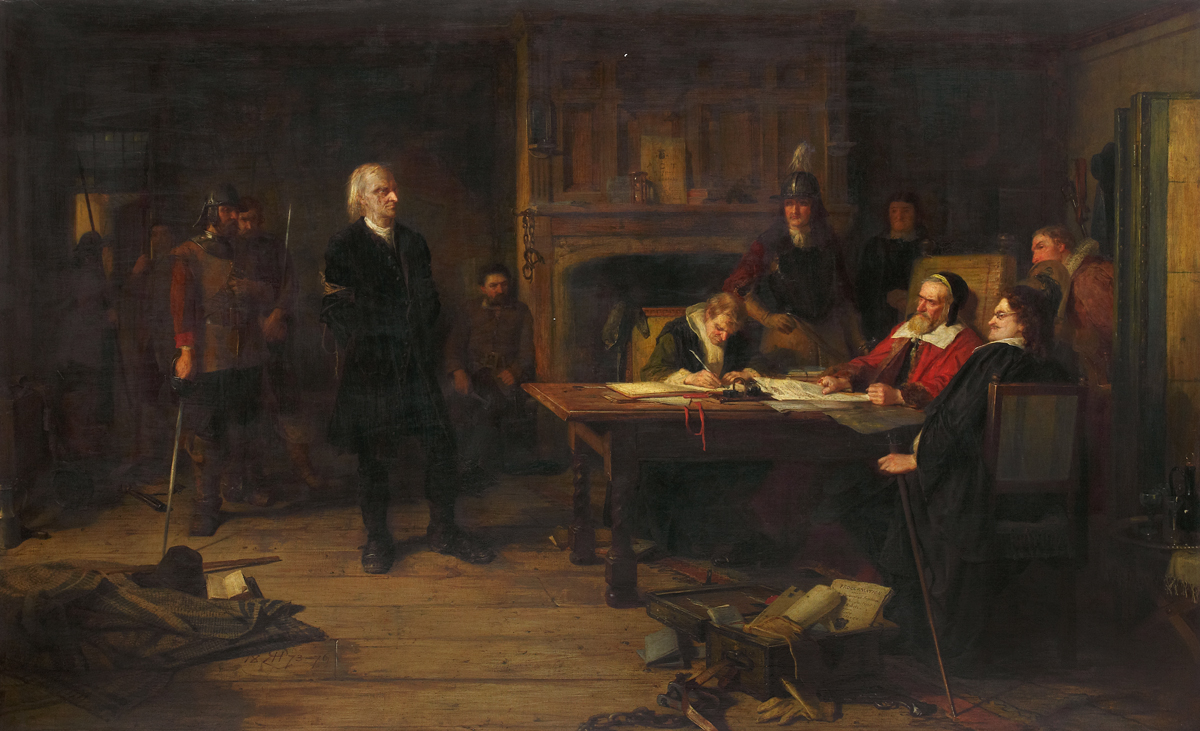
A Conventicle Preacher before the Justices, painting by Robert Inerarity Herdman

Around the beginning of 1670, he was apprehended for preaching and baptizing in houses and sent to Edinburgh. He lay successively in the Canongate jail, in Stirling Castle, and Dumbarton Castle, till about the time of the granting of the second indulgence in September 1672, when he was liberated. By this indulgence, he was allowed to exercise his ministry within the parish of Cumbraes. But he declined to accept of this ensnaring boon, and associated with Mr John Welsh and others in preaching in the fields. Along with John Welsh and others, went about from place to place "holding conventicles, marrying, baptizing, and dispensing the Lord's Supper." For nine years he assiduously carried on these earnest labours.

In July 1674, he was publicly denounced a rebel and put to the horn. Hunter states that he fled to Holland although the source of this information is unclear. In August 1676, letters of intercommuning were issued against him. In 1681 he was captured and sent to the Edinburgh Tolbooth. On 15 February 1683 he was apprehended in Edinburgh, and on 15 September next year, the Council ordered him to be sent to the Bass Rock. He was sent at the same time as Sir Hugh Campbell but neither he nor Hugh's son Sir George Campbell was permitted to ride in a coach or on a horse someone provided. Like Mr John Blackadder, he lay there till released by the hand of death. His mortal remains were carried from his prison and interred in the churchyard of North Berwick.

== Bibliography ==
- Inq. Ret. Gen., 4962
- Kirkton's and Wodrow's Histories
- Crichton's Memoirs of Blackadder
