= Thomas Hog =

17th c. parish minister

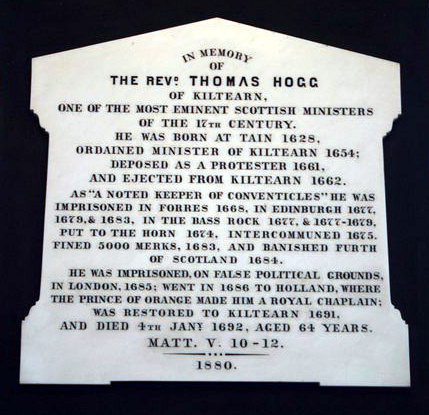
- Plaque to Rev. Thomas Hog, Evanton Parish Church

Personal details
- Born: early 1628
- Died: 4 January 1692
- Denomination: Christian
- Education: Marischal College

Rev Thomas Hog of Kiltearn (1628–1692) was a controversial 17th century Scottish minister.

== Early life ==
He was born at Tain, Ross-shire, in the beginning of 1628 to "honest parents- native highlanders somewhat above the vulgar rank".

He was educated at Tain grammar school, then studied Divinity at Marischal College, Aberdeen, where he proceeded to the degree of M.A. in 1650 In 1654 he received license, and became chaplain to John, earl of Sutherland at Dunrobin. On 24 October 1654 he was ordained minister of Kiltearn, a parish six miles from Dingwall, on the shore of Cromarty Firth, and entered on the discharge of his duties with great ardour. He had also been called to Golspie.

== Activities while deposed ==
In the controversy between the resolutionists and protesters, then at its height, he sided warmly with the protesters, and was in consequence deposed in 1661 by the synod of Ross. Hog then retired to Knockoudie in Auldearn, Nairn, where he continued to preach and dispense the sacraments, and memorable communions were observed in a sheltered hollow of the Hills of the Arstill, known as "Hog's Strype.". In July 1668 he was delated by the Bishop of Moray for preaching in his own house and ‘keeping conventicles.’ For these offences he was imprisoned for some time in Forres, but was at length liberated at the intercession of the Earl of Tweeddale, upon giving bail to appear when called on. Not having, however, desisted from preaching, ‘letters of intercommuning’ were on 6 August 1675 issued against him, forbidding all persons to harbour or help him in any way.

== Arrest and sentence ==
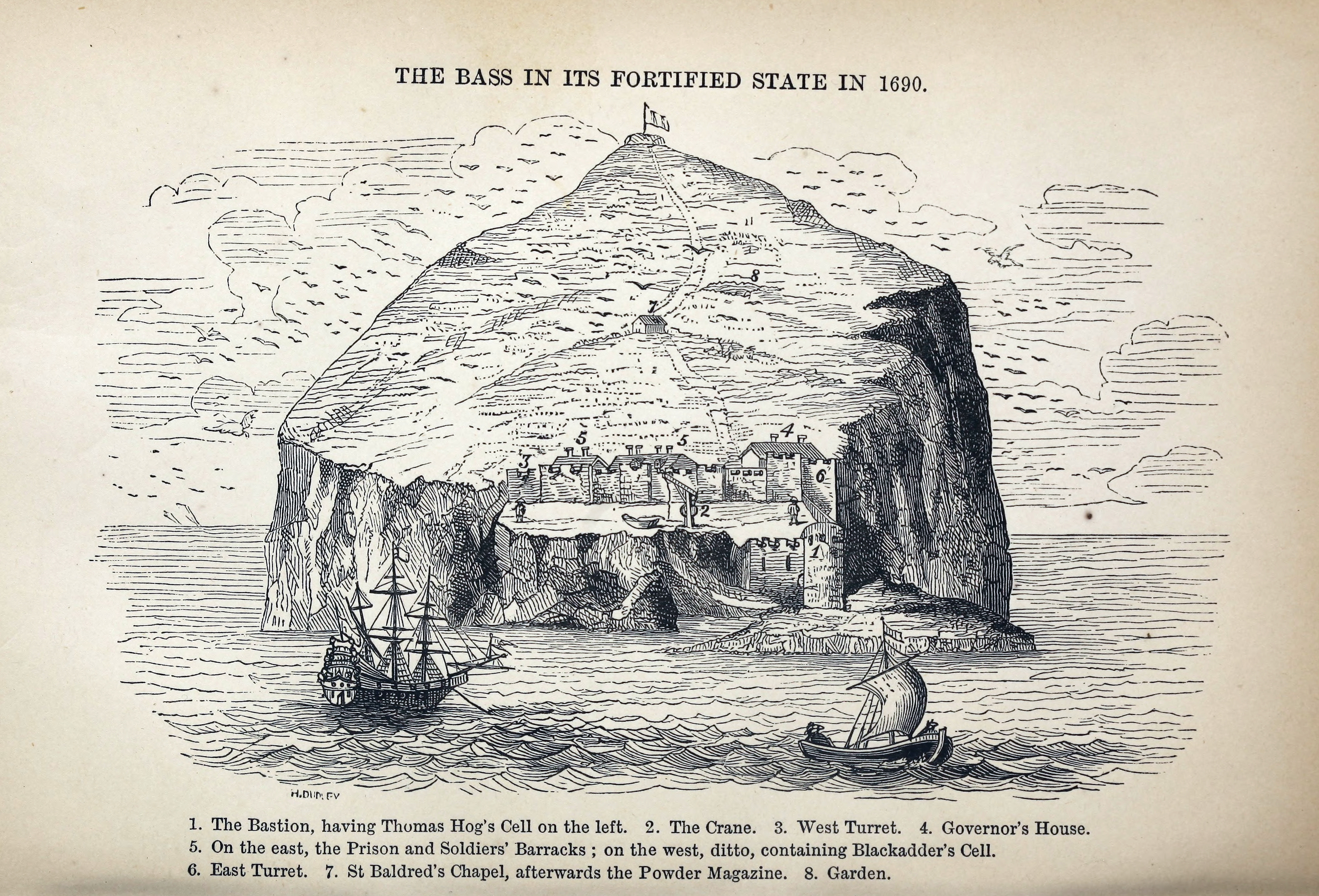
Sketch of the Bass Rock including position of Thomas Hog's cell

In January 1677 he voluntarily surrendered to the Earl of Moray, was removed to Edinburgh Tolbooth and sent to the Bass Rock, where he became seriously ill. An Edinburgh physician who was called to see him, petitioned the council for his release, to which some of the members were disposed, but Archbishop Sharp stated "the prisoner did and was in a capacity to do more hurt to their interests sitting in his elbow chair than twenty others could, and if the justice of God was pursuing him to take him off the stage, the clemency of the Government should not interpose to hinder it." He was accordingly confined more closely than before. On hearing his sentence he exclaimed in bed, "It was as severe as if Satan himself had penned it." King says about the incident: "he became so sickly that his physician and the lay lords of the council urged his liberation;when, in place of release, he was, on the motion of Sharpe, backed by the other prelates, thrown into the lowest vault of that dreary and filthy prison. Here, however, instead of perishing, as was probably expected, he recovered, to the astonishment of friends and enemies. In aftertimes, when the archbishop happened to be mentioned in his presence with disapprobation, he used to say, "Commend me to him for a good physician.""

On 9 October 1677 he was brought back to the Tolbooth, but was again returned to the Bass until set at liberty with others in July 1679, giving bond for 10,000 merks to appear before the Council when called but forbidden to go beyond ‘the bounds of Kintyre’. He remained unmolested till 8 November 1683 when he was charged before the Scottish privy council with keeping ‘house conventicles.’ As he refused to answer the charge, it was held as confessed, and he was fined in five thousand merks. Having decided to quit the country he petitioned to that effect and was enjoined to depart within forty-eight hours. So he was banished from Scotland on 28 March 1684.

== Flight to Holland ==
He lived for a year in Berwick-upon-Tweed and in 1685 found his way to London, intending to sail to Carolina, but he was apprehended on suspicion of being concerned in the Rebellion of the Duke of Monmouth. He was released in 1685, and fled to Holland, where the Prince of Orange made him one of his chaplains. He returned to Scotland early in 1688, and being restored by Act of Parliament, 25 April 1690, was a member of Assembly that year. He was restored to the parish of Kiltearn, as he is said to have predicted thirty years before would be the case. He was preparing to remove to London, but died after a long and painful sickness, 4 January 1692. At his own request was buried underneath the threshold of his church door, with this inscription over the remains: ‘This stone shall bear witness against the parishioners of Kiltearn if they bring an ungodly minister in here.’ The plaque is dated 1940 and is not original, but is thought to replicate an earlier inscription. A commemorative slab was placed in the parish church and the Hog Memorial Church was erected in the village of Evanton.

== Family ==
He married after 12 April 1656, the sister of John Hay of Inshock and Park, cadet of Errol (she died without children).

== Bibliography ==
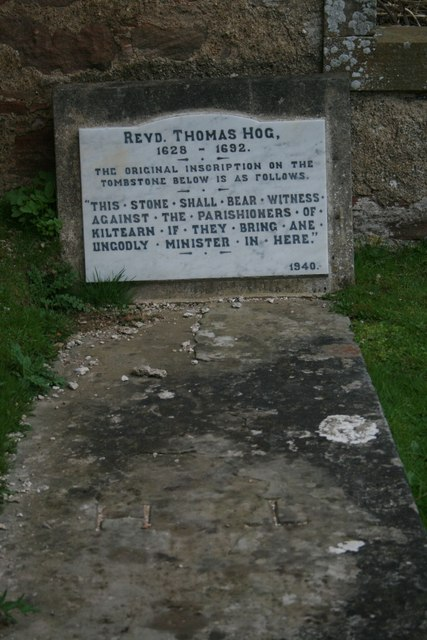
Grave of Thomas Hog, Kiltearn

- Memoirs of His Life (Andrew Stevenson, Edinburgh, 1756).— Edin. Chr. Inst., xxv.
- Brodie's Diary
- Wodrow's Correspondence, i., 166
- The Bass Rock, 174-98
- Kirkton's History, 330
- Wodrow's History, ii. 112 et seq.; iv. 511–13, and Anal., ii., 162;
- Reg. Gen. Assembly, 1690
- Memoirs of Katherine Collace
- Scenes in the Life of James Hog
- Crichton's Memoir of Blackader
- King's Covenanters in the North, 365
- Covenanters in Moray and Ross, 79 et seq.
- Hugh Miller's Scenes and Legends, 112
- Dictionary of National Biography
- Tombstone
