= Bass Rock =

Island in the east of Scotland

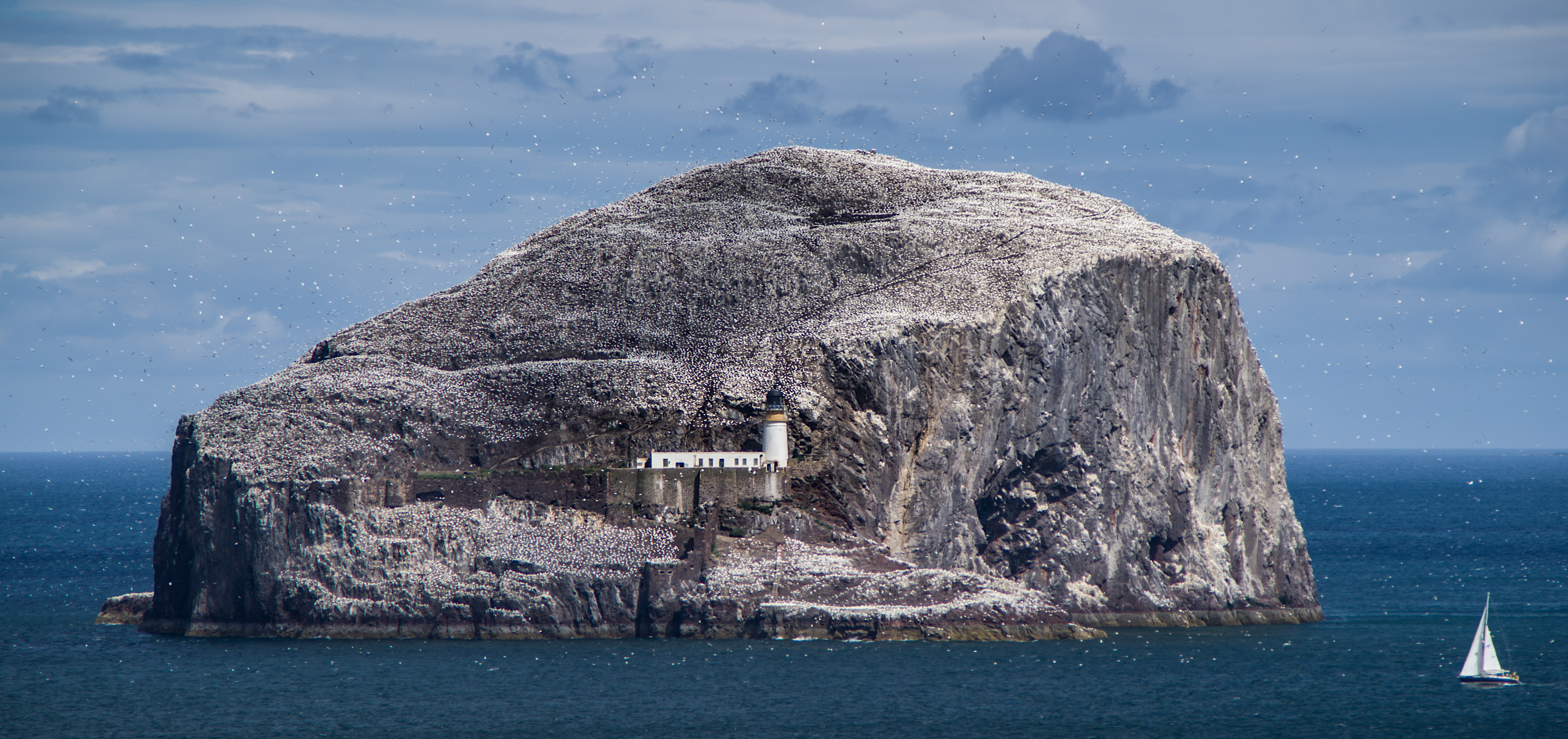

Location
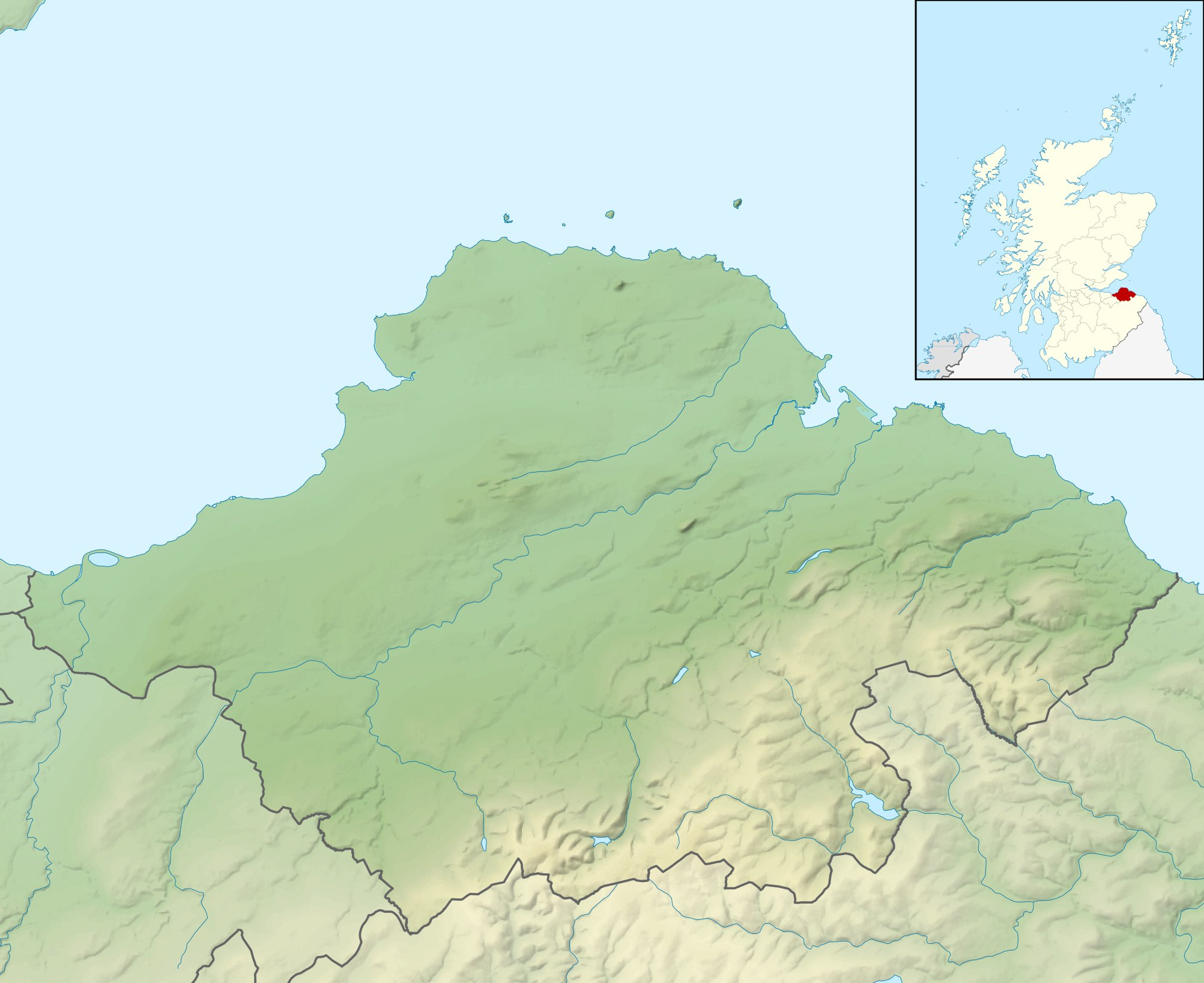
- Bass Rock shown within East Lothian
- OS grid reference: NT602873
- Coordinates: 56°04′40″N 2°38′25″W

Physical geography
- Island group: Islands of the Forth
- Area: 3 ha (7 acres)
- Highest elevation: 107 m (351 ft)

Administration
- Council area: East Lothian
- Country: Scotland
- Sovereign state: United Kingdom

Demographics
- Population: 0

The Bass Rock, or simply the Bass ( /bæs/), is an island in the outer part of the Firth of Forth in the east of Scotland. Approximately 2 km (1 mi) offshore, and 5 km (3 mi) north-east of North Berwick, it is a steep-sided volcanic plug, 107 m (351 ft) at its highest point, and is home to a large colony of gannets. The rock is uninhabited by man, but historically has been settled by an 8th-century Christian hermit, and later was the site of an important castle, which after the Commonwealth period was used as a prison. The island belongs to RSPB Scotland, being previously owned by Hew Hamilton-Dalrymple, whose family acquired it in 1706, and previously to the Lauder family for almost six centuries. The Bass Rock Lighthouse was constructed on the rock in 1902, and the remains of a chapel survive.

The Bass Rock features in many works of fiction, including Lion Let Loose by Nigel Tranter, Catriona by Robert Louis Stevenson, The Lion Is Rampant by the Scottish novelist Ross Laidlaw and The New Confessions by William Boyd. Most recently it features prominently in The Bass Rock by Evie Wyld, which won the 2021 Stella Prize.

== Geography and geology ==
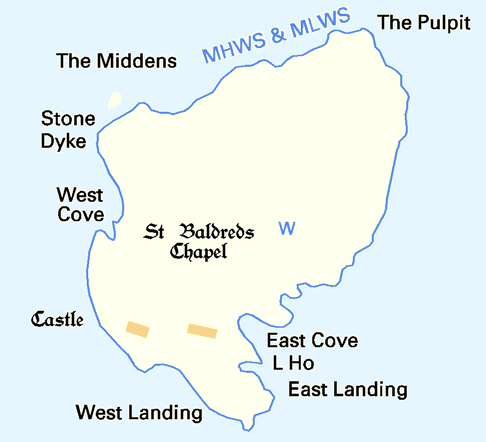
Map of Bass Rock

An aerial view of Bass Rock

The island is a volcanic plug of phonolitic trachyte rock of Carboniferous (Dinantian) age. The rock was first recognised as an igneous intrusion by James Hutton. Hugh Miller visited in 1847 and wrote about the rock's geology in his book Edinburgh and its Neighbourhood, Geological and Historical: with The Geology of the Bass Rock. It is one of a small number of islands off the East Lothian coast including the Islands of the Forth. To the west are Craigleith, the Lamb, Fidra and finally to the west of Fidra, the low-lying island of Eyebroughy. These are also mainly the result of volcanic activity. To the northeast can be seen the Isle of May off the coast of the East Neuk of Fife.

Bass Rock stands more than 100 m (330 ft) high in the Firth of Forth Islands Special Protection Area which covers some but not all of the islands in the inner and outer Firth. The Bass Rock is a Site of Special Scientific Interest in its own right, due to its gannet colony. It is sometimes called "the Ailsa Craig of the East". It is of a similar age (c.340 million years), geological form and petrology to nearby North Berwick Law, a hill on the mainland and to Traprain Law. There are related volcanic formations on the adjacent island of Craigleith and within nearby Edinburgh, namely Arthur's Seat, Calton Hill and Castle Rock.

The Bass does not occupy the skyline of the Firth quite as much as its equivalent in the Clyde, Ailsa Craig, but it can be seen from much of southern and eastern Fife, most of East Lothian, and high points in the Lothians and Borders, such as Arthur's Seat, and the Lammermuir.

== Human history ==
St Baldred's Chapel

The island was a retreat for an early Christian saint, Baldred, "the Apostle of the Lothians". Baldred is believed to have founded a monastery at Tyninghame. However, at times he retreated to the Bass Rock where he built a small hermitage.

=== Settlement ===
The earliest recorded proprietors are the Lauder of the Bass family, from whom Sir Harry Lauder is descended. According to legend, the island is said to have been a gift from King Malcolm III of Scotland. The crest on their heraldic arms is, appropriately, a gannet sitting upon a rock.

The 15th-century Scottish writer Hector Boece gave the following description (original spelling):

ane wounderful crag, risand within the sea, with so narrow and strait hals [passage] that na schip nor boit bot allanerlie at ane part of it. This crag is callet the Bas; unwinnabil by ingine [ingenuity] of man. In it are coves, als profitable for defence of men as [if] thay were biggit be crafty industry. Every thing that is in that crag is ful of admiration and wounder.

The origins of the castle are unknown. Sir Robert de Lawedre is mentioned by Blind Harry in The Actes and Deidis of the Illustre and Vallyeant Campioun Schir William Wallace. His tombstone, in the old kirk in North Berwick, as recorded in 1718, read "here lies Sir Robert de Lawedre, great laird Congalton and the Bass, who died May 1311". In 1316, his son obtained the whole island with that part previously retained by the Church because it contained the holy cell of Saint Baldred.

In 1406, as related by Walter Bower and Andrew of Wyntoun's Cronykil, King Robert III, apprehensive of danger to his son James (afterwards James I) from the Black Douglases, placed the prince in the safety of the Castle of the Bass. James embarked on the Maryenknecht but was detained in England. In 1424 Robert Lauder, with 18 men, had safe conduct with a host of other noblemen, as a hostage for James I at Durham. When King James I returned from captivity in England, he imprisoned his cousin, Walter Stewart, the eldest son of Murdoch Stewart, Duke of Albany, in the Castle of the Bass. Walter's custodians were John Heryng and Robert Lauder, now a close royal councillor.

In May 1497 King James IV visited the Bass and stayed in the castle with a later Sir Robert Lauder of the Bass. The boatmen who conveyed the King from Dunbar were paid 14 shillings. George Lauder entertained King James VI of Scotland when he visited the Bass in 1581; the king was so enamoured that he offered to buy the island, a proposition which did not commend itself to George Lauder. George was a Privy Counsellor – described as the King's "familiar councillor" – and tutor to the young Prince Henry. Anne of Denmark planned to visit the Bass in June 1597 while staying at Seton Palace. The second-last Lauder laird, George Lauder of the Bass died in his castle on the Bass in 1611.

In 1848 it was reported that there were "about a score and a half" of sheep grazing on the island. By 1870 it was claimed that "twenty-five sheep could be grazed on the grassy top of the rock".

=== Castle ===
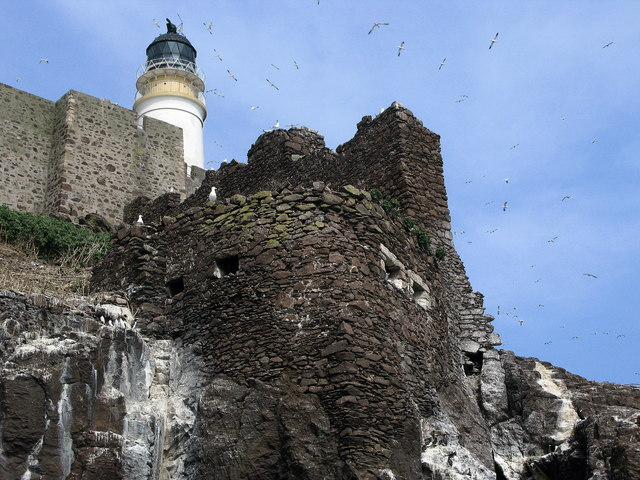
The remains of the castle in 2007, and the lighthouse

Fortifications on the Bass Rock

The Lauders built a fortification not far above the island's only landing-place. The slope is crossed by a curtain wall, which naturally follows the lie of the ground, having projections and round bastions where a rocky projection offers a suitable foundation. The parapets are battlemented, with the usual walk along the top of the walls. Another curtain wall at right-angles runs down to the sea close to the landing-place, ending in a ruined round tower, whose vaulted base has poorly splayed and apparently rather unskilfully constructed embrasures. The entrance passes through this outwork wall close to where it joins the other.

The main defences are entered a little farther on in the same line, through a projecting two-story building which has some fireplaces with very simple and late mouldings. The buildings are of the local basalt, and the masonry is rough rubble; there are, as is so frequently the case, no very clear indications for dating the different parts, which were in all probability erected at different times.

A little beyond the entrance there was a tower that formed a simple keep/bastion and to which had been added a gabled chamber in the 17th century, which, though of restricted dimensions, must have been comfortable enough, with blue Dutch tiles round its moulded fireplace, later very much decayed. The keep and the living quarters within the walls were taken down to provide stone for the lighthouse in 1902.

A well at the top of the Bass, where today the foghorn is situated, provided freshwater for the island's occupants.

=== Chapel ===
Halfway up the island stands the ruin of St Baldred's Chapel, which is sited upon a cell or cave in which this Scottish Saint spent some time. Although the Lauders held most of the Bass Rock, this part of it had remained in the ownership of the Church until 1316, when it was granted to the family. The chapel appears to have been rebuilt by the Lauder family several times. A papal bull dated 6 May 1493, refers to the parish church of the Bass, or the Chapel of St Baldred, being noviter erecta (newly established) at that time. On 5 January 1542 John Lauder, son of Sir Robert Lauder of the Bass, was recorded as "the Cardinal's Secretary" representing Cardinal David Beaton at a reconsecration of the restored and ancient St Baldred's chapel on the Bass. In 1576 it was recorded that the church on the Bass, and that at Auldhame on the mainland, required no readers, doubtless something to do with the Reformation.

=== Prison ===
During the 15th century James I consigned several of his political enemies, including Walter Stewart, to the Bass. In this period, many members of the Clan MacKay ended up there, including Neil Bhass MacKay (Niall "Bhas" MacAoidh), who gained his epithet from being imprisoned there as a fourteen-year-old in 1428. He was kept there as a hostage after his father, Aonghas Dubh (Angus Dhu) of Strathnaver in Sutherland, was released, as security. According to one website

Following the murder of King James at Perth in 1437 Neil escaped from the Bass and was proclaimed 8th Chief of the Clan Mackay.

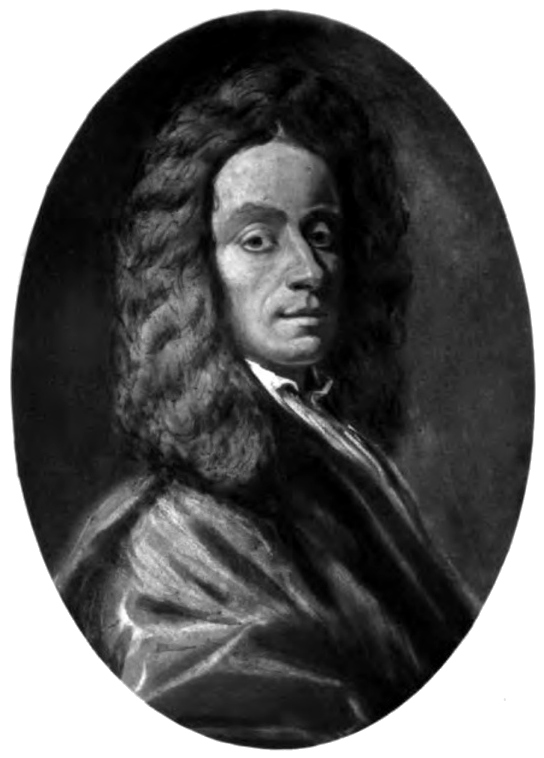
John Spreul known as Bass John since he was imprisoned on the Bass for six years.

The Bass from the air

After almost 600 years, the Lauders lost the Bass in the 17th century during Cromwell's invasion, and the castle subsequently (in 1671) became a notorious jail to which for many decades religious and political prisoners, especially Covenanters were sent. The island has been called the Patmos of Scotland, referring the exile to that island of John of Patmos. Alexander Shields the Covenanting preacher, imprisoned on the island, later described the Bass as "a dry and cold rock in the sea, where they had no fresh water nor any provision but what they had brought many miles from the country, and when they got it, it would not keep unspoiled". He is reported to have escaped by dressing in women's clothing but this occurred from the Edinburgh Tolbooth rather than from the island's jail.

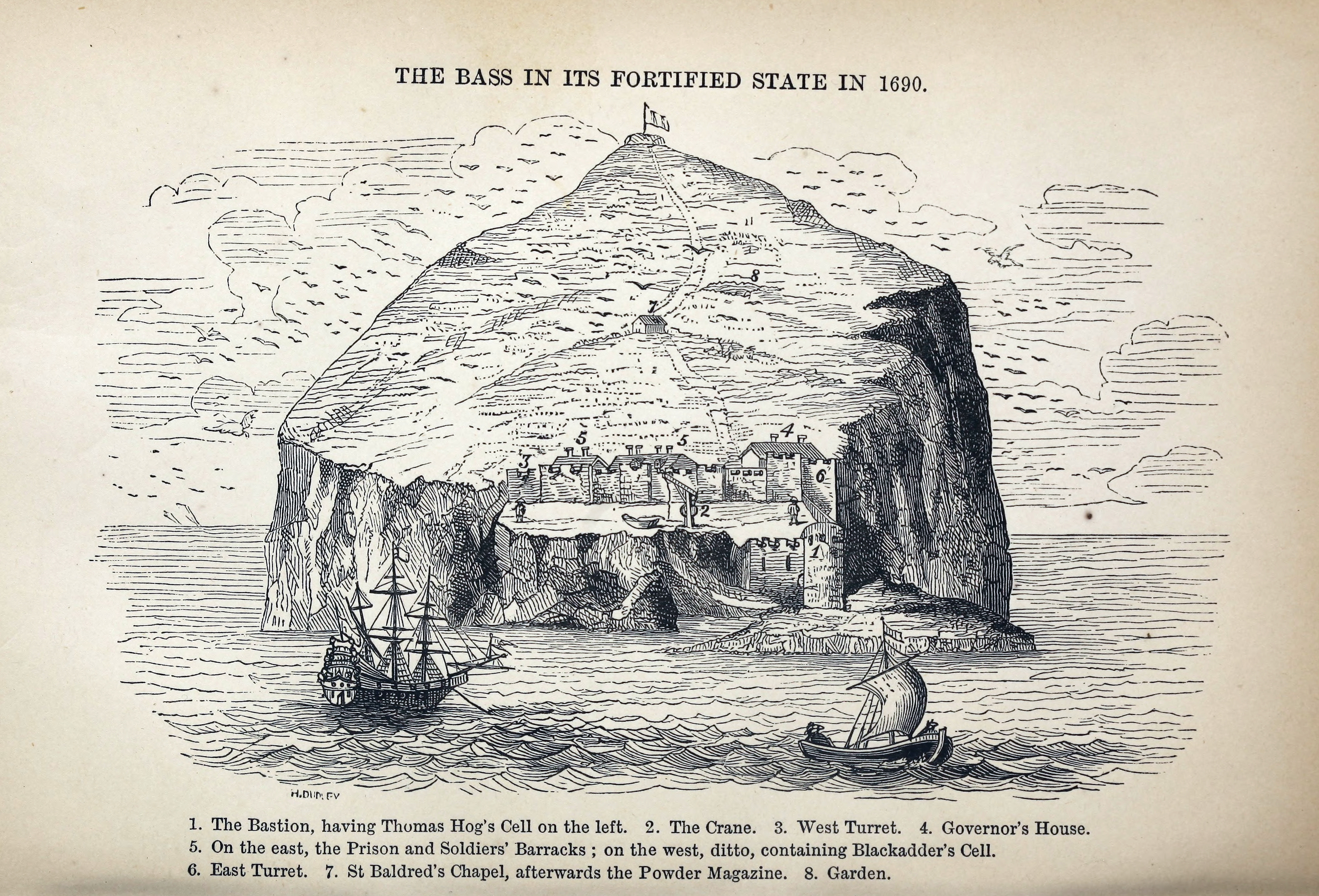
The Bass in the 17th century including the cells of Hog and Blackadder

James Fraser of Brea gave a fuller description including eating fruit from the island's cherry trees. John Blackadder, and John Rae, died on the Bass and were buried at North Berwick. Blackadder had a Free Church named after him there.

James Anderson lists 39 Covenanting "martyrs" who were imprisoned on the Bass: Patrick Anderson, William Bell, Robert Bennet of Chesters, John Blackadder, Sir Hugh Campbell, Sir George Campbell, John Campbell, Robert Dick, John Dickson, James Drummond, Alexander Dunbar, James Fithie, Alexander Forrester, James Fraser, Robert Gillespie, Alexander Gordon, John Greig, Thomas Hog, Peter Kid, John Law, Joseph Learmont, William Lin, James Macaulay, John M'Gilligen, James Mitchell, Alexander Peden, Michael Potter, John Rae, Archibald Riddell, Robert Ross, Thomas Ross, Gilbert Rule, George Scot, Alexander Shields, William Spence, John Spreul (apothecary), John Spreul (town clerk), John Stewart, and Robert Traill.

Charles Maitland held the Bass for James VII for a brief period after the Scottish Convention declared him to be deposed.

However, some of the prisoners were imprisoned there for minor misdemeanors. In 1678 Hector Allan, a Quaker in Leith was sentenced to a period on the Rock for "abusing and railing" (i.e. verbally insulting) Rev Thomas Wilkie of North Leith Parish Church. Although this was then commuted to imprisonment in Leith Tolbooth, this seems a harsh punishment.

An extraordinary chapter in the Bass Rock's history was its seizure by four Jacobites imprisoned in its castle, which they then held against government forces for nearly three years, 1691–1694. In 1688 the Catholic King James VII had been deposed by and replaced by William II (III of England) and Mary II. During the ensuing years, supporters of exiled King James, known as ‘Jacobites’, fought unsuccessful wars of resistance in Scotland and Ireland, where Catholic allegiances were strongest. The Bass Rock's castle was one of the last places in Scotland to be surrendered to William III's new government, being handed over in 1690 by governor Charles Maitland. William III's government then chose it as a prison for its Jacobite opponents. In 1691 four captured Catholic Jacobite officers were imprisoned there. On 18 June 1691, they managed to seize the Bass Rock's castle while the much-depleted garrison was outside its walls for the difficult task of unloading a coal ship on the rocky landing stage. The garrison had no choice but to depart on the coal ship. When news spread on the nearby Scottish mainland, Jacobite supporters made covert boat trips to the Bass Rock with supplies and with men who wished to join the defenders. Word reached King James, exiled in France under the protection of Louis XIV, and ships from France brought supplies, including two large rowing boats from King James. The Jacobites used these boats to mount raids on the mainland for more supplies. They used the castle's cannon to waylay some passing ships. William III's government sent two large warships to bombard the castle but its position high above a sheer rock face made it impregnable. A naval blockade of the Bass Rock was then attempted instead which made access to fresh supplies increasingly difficult for the defenders. Their numbers had fallen since some were captured during raids on the mainland – there had been possibly 20 defenders at most. Furthermore, prospects for the Jacobite cause elsewhere in Britain had become hopeless. However, William III's government was itself in despair at how to end the Bass Rock siege. In early 1694 the Bass Rock prisoners' leader, Captain Michael Middleton, negotiated a visit by government representatives to discuss a solution. Middleton guessed that his adversaries lacked any means for estimating the number of defenders or their reserves of food, in view of the covert comings and goings to the island by ships from the mainland or from France. Accordingly, he stage-managed the visit to give a deceptive impression of strength on both counts. The ruse succeeded. On 18 April 1694 the Jacobite defenders accepted the very attractive surrender terms which they were offered – freedom, free transport to France if they wished, and release from prison for people who had been caught helping them from the mainland.

Bass Rock Act 1707
- Act of Parliament
- Parliament of Scotland
- Long title: Ratification in favours of Sir Hugh Dalrymple of Northberwick Lord President of the College of Justice of a Gift of the Island and rock called Bass.
- Citation: 1707 c. 38

Dates
- Royal assent: 21 March 1707

=== Private hands ===
The fortress was abandoned by the government in 1701, and on 31 July 1706 the President of the Court of Session, Hew Dalrymple, Lord North Berwick, acquired the Bass by charter, ratified by an act of Parliament, the Bass Rock Act 1707 in March 1707), for a purely nominal sum.

Its inaccessibility came to mean something impossible with the saying:

Ding doun Tantallon,—
Mak a brig to the Bass.

In 2026, the Dalrymple family sold the island to the Royal Society for the Protection of Birds.

== Fauna and flora ==
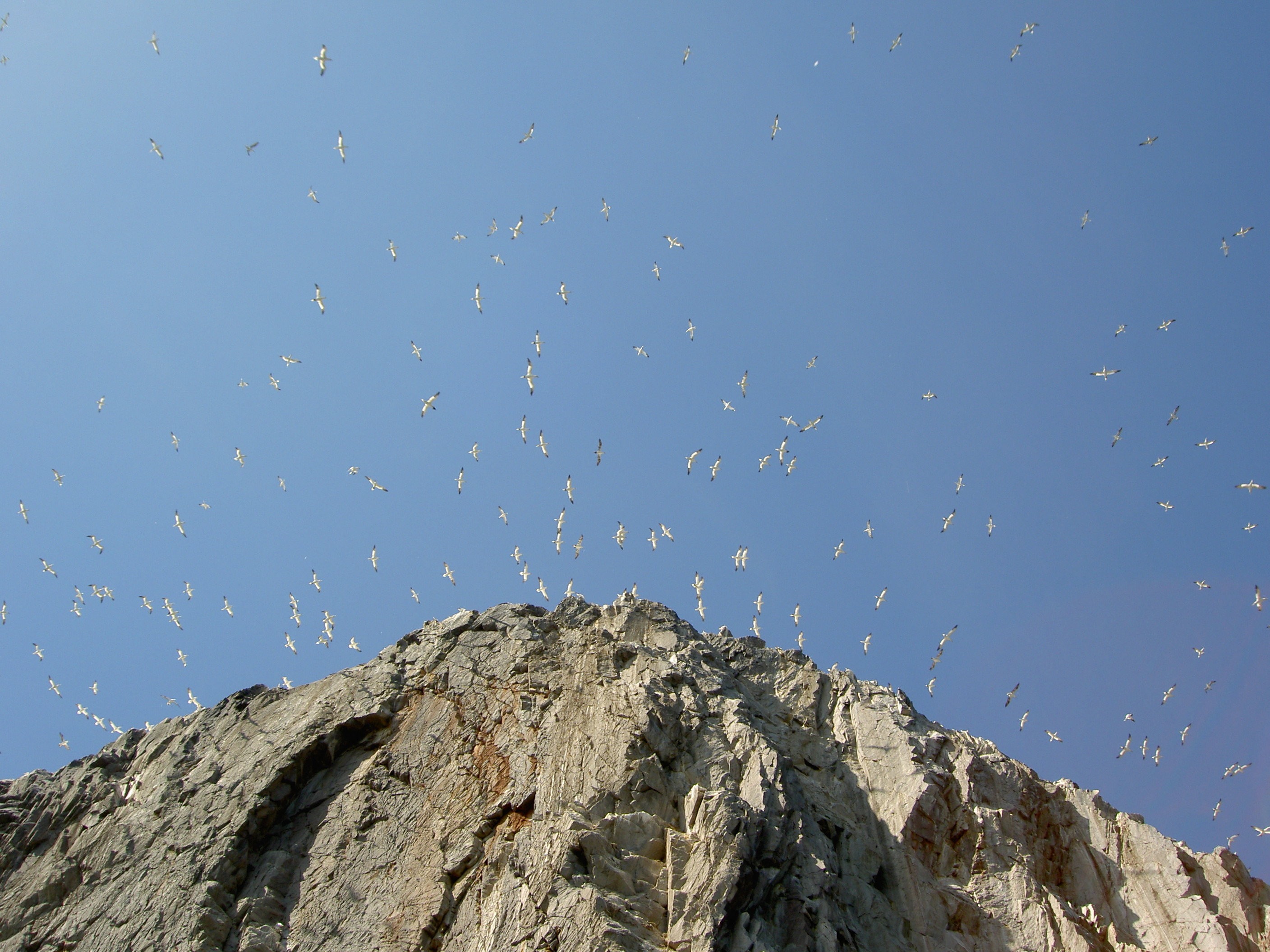
Northern gannets circling above the Bass

=== Animals ===
The island plays host to more than 150,000 northern gannets and is the world's largest colony of the species. Described famously by naturalists as "one of the wildlife wonders of the world" (often credited to David Attenborough), it was also awarded BBC Countryfile magazine's Nature Reserve of the Year, following a nomination by Chris Packham, in 2014/15. When viewed from the mainland, large regions of the surface appear white owing to the sheer number of birds (and their droppings, which give off 152,000 kg of ammonia per year, equivalent to the achievements of 10 million broilers). In fact the scientific name for the northern gannet, Morus bassanus, derives from the rock. It was known traditionally in Scots as a "solan goose". As on other gannetries, such as St Kilda, the birds were harvested for their eggs and the flesh of their young chicks, which were considered delicacies. It is estimated that in 1850 almost 2,000 birds were harvested from the rock. Other bird species that frequent the rock include guillemot, razorbill, shag, puffin, eider and numerous gulls.

The natural history of the rock was written about in John Mair's De Gestis Scotorum ("The deeds of the Scots"), published in 1521. Today, the Scottish Seabird Centre at North Berwick has solar-powered cameras located on the island which beam back live close-up images of the seabirds to large screens on the mainland, just over a mile away. The images are sharp enough for visitors at the Seabird Centre to read the ID rings on birds' feet. The Seabird Centre has a range of cameras located on the islands of the Forth and also broadcasts the images live on the internet. The centre also has exclusive landing rights to the island from the owner Hew Hamilton-Dalrymple and operates a range of boat trips going around, and landing on, the island throughout the year, weather permitting.

In mid-June 2022 highly pathogenic avian influenza (HPAI) was detected in the northern gannets connected to the Bass Rock, at that time the world's largest colony. In 2022 more than 5,000 dead birds were counted on a single day, following a whole-island drone survey undertaken by the University of Edinburgh, in a colony that normally had 150,000 birds. Susan Davies, chief executive of the Scottish Seabird Centre, said, "We know many more birds died before and after that. The scale of impact was heartbreaking to see."

=== Plants ===
The soil is fertile and supports a wide variety of plants. These include the Bass mallow which is otherwise only found on a few other islands, including Ailsa Craig and Steep Holm.

== Artistic influences ==
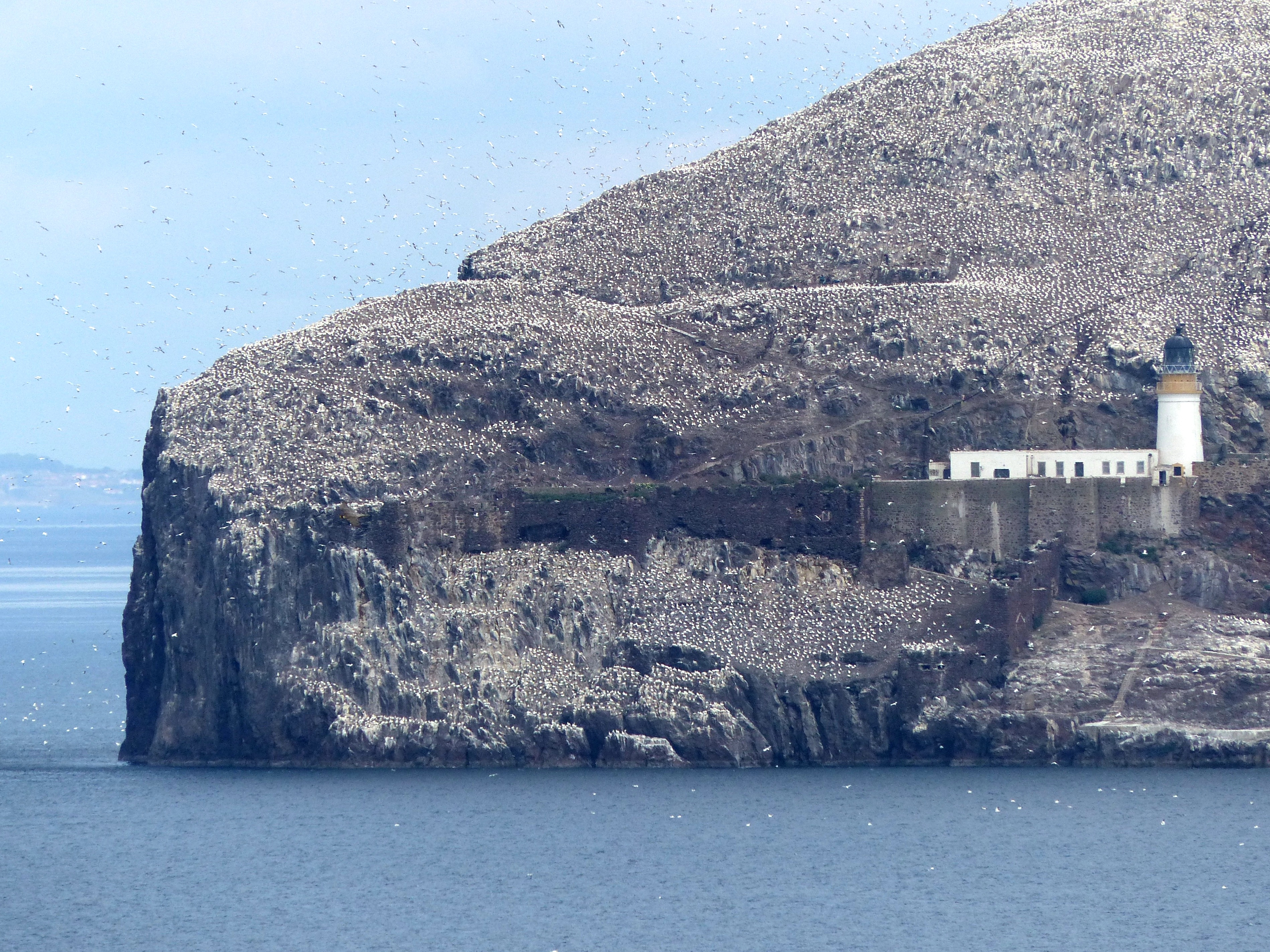
The rock in close up showing nesting northern gannets

Due to its imposing nature, prison and connection with Scottish history, the Bass has been featured in several fictional works.

=== Robert Louis Stevenson ===
Robert Louis Stevenson had at least one strong connection with the Bass, as his cousin, David Stevenson, designed the lighthouse there. Amongst his earliest memories were holidays in North Berwick. He often stayed at Scoughall Farm, whence the Bass can be seen, and local lore is credited as the inspiration for his short story The Wreckers.

Catriona is Stevenson's 1893 sequel to Kidnapped. Both novels are set in the aftermath of the Jacobite risings, in the mid-18th century. The first part of Catriona recounts the attempts of the hero – David Balfour – to gain justice for James Stewart – James of the Glens – who has been arrested and charged with complicity in the Appin Murder. David makes a statement to a lawyer, and goes on to meet Lord Prestongrange – the Lord Advocate – to press the case for James' innocence. However his attempts fail as he is once again kidnapped and confined on the Bass Rock, until the trial is over, and James condemned to death.

The book begins with a dedication to Charles Baxter, a friend of Stevenson, written in his home in Western Samoa and says:

There should be left in our native city some seed of the elect; some long-legged, hot-headed youth must repeat to-day our dreams and wanderings of so many years ago; he will relish the pleasure, which should have been ours, to follow among named streets and numbered houses the country walks of David Balfour, to identify Dean, and Silvermills, and Broughton, and Hope Park, and Pilrig, and poor old Lochend – if it still be standing, and the Figgate Whins [the area near Portobello] – if there be any of them left; or to push (on a long holiday) so far afield as Gillane or the Bass. So, perhaps, his eye shall be opened to behold the series of the generations, and he shall weigh with surprise his momentous and nugatory gift of life.

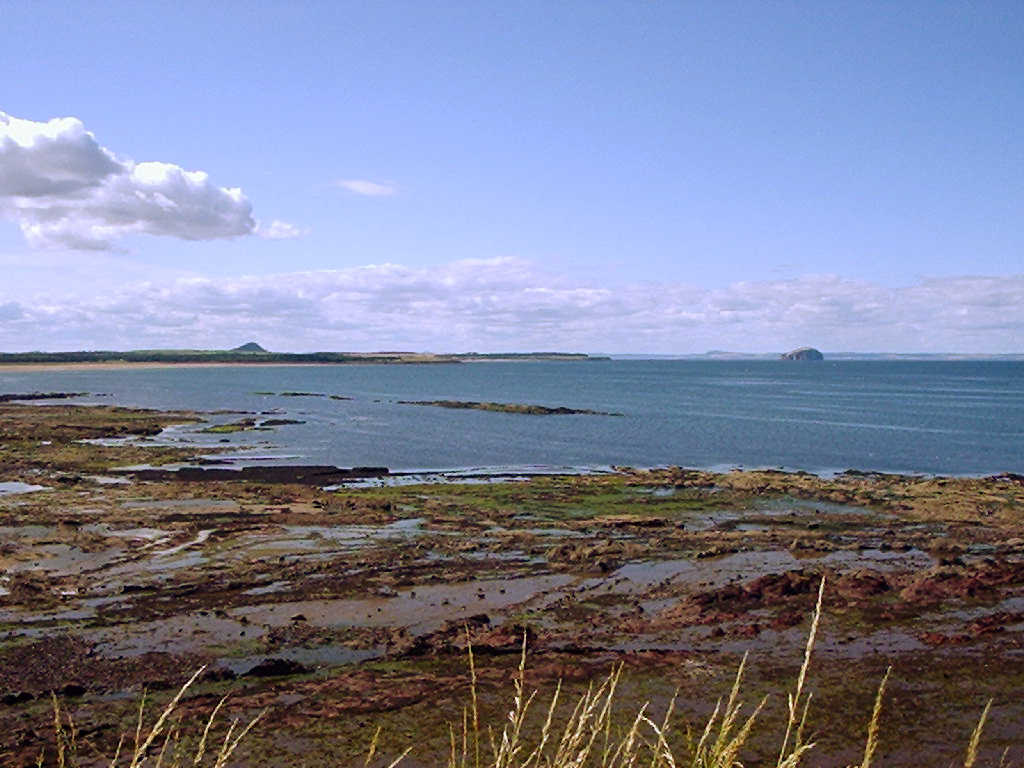
View towards Belhaven Bay (John Muir Country Park) from Dunbar with North Berwick Law and Bass Rock in the distance

Chapter XIV is entitled simply The Bass, and gives a long description of the island, which is described as "just the one crag of rock, as everybody knows, but great enough to carve a city from".

It was an unco place by night, unco by day; and there were unco sounds; of the calling of the solans [gannets], and the plash [splash] of the sea, and the rock echoes that hung continually in our ears. It was chiefly so in moderate weather. When the waves were anyway great they roared about the rock like thunder and the drums of armies, dreadful, but merry to hear, and it was in the calm days when a man could daunt himself with listening; so many still, hollow noises haunted and reverberated in the porches of the rock.

=== Bruce Marshall ===
Scottish writer Bruce Marshall used Bass Rock as the miraculous destination of the "Garden of Eden", a dance hall of dubious reputation in his 1938 novel Father Malachy's Miracle. The book was the basis for the German film Das Wunder des Malachias a 1961 black-and-white film directed by Bernhard Wicki and starring Horst Bollmann, although the film did not specify Bass Rock as the destination of the offending dance hall.

=== Jane Lane ===
Jane Lane's 1950 Fortress in the Forth is a historical novel based on the actual 1691–1694 seizure of the Bass Rock castle by four Jacobite officers imprisoned there and their subsequent defence of the island against William III's government for nearly three years. The final page summarises the differences between this fictional account and actual events: the names of the main characters have been changed to justify novelist inventions about their personalities, but otherwise the story largely follows the historical facts. The novel takes the form of invented letters and journal entries by different characters in order to tell the tale. A detailed diagram of the Bass Rock and its castle is supplied to show the locations of places mentioned.

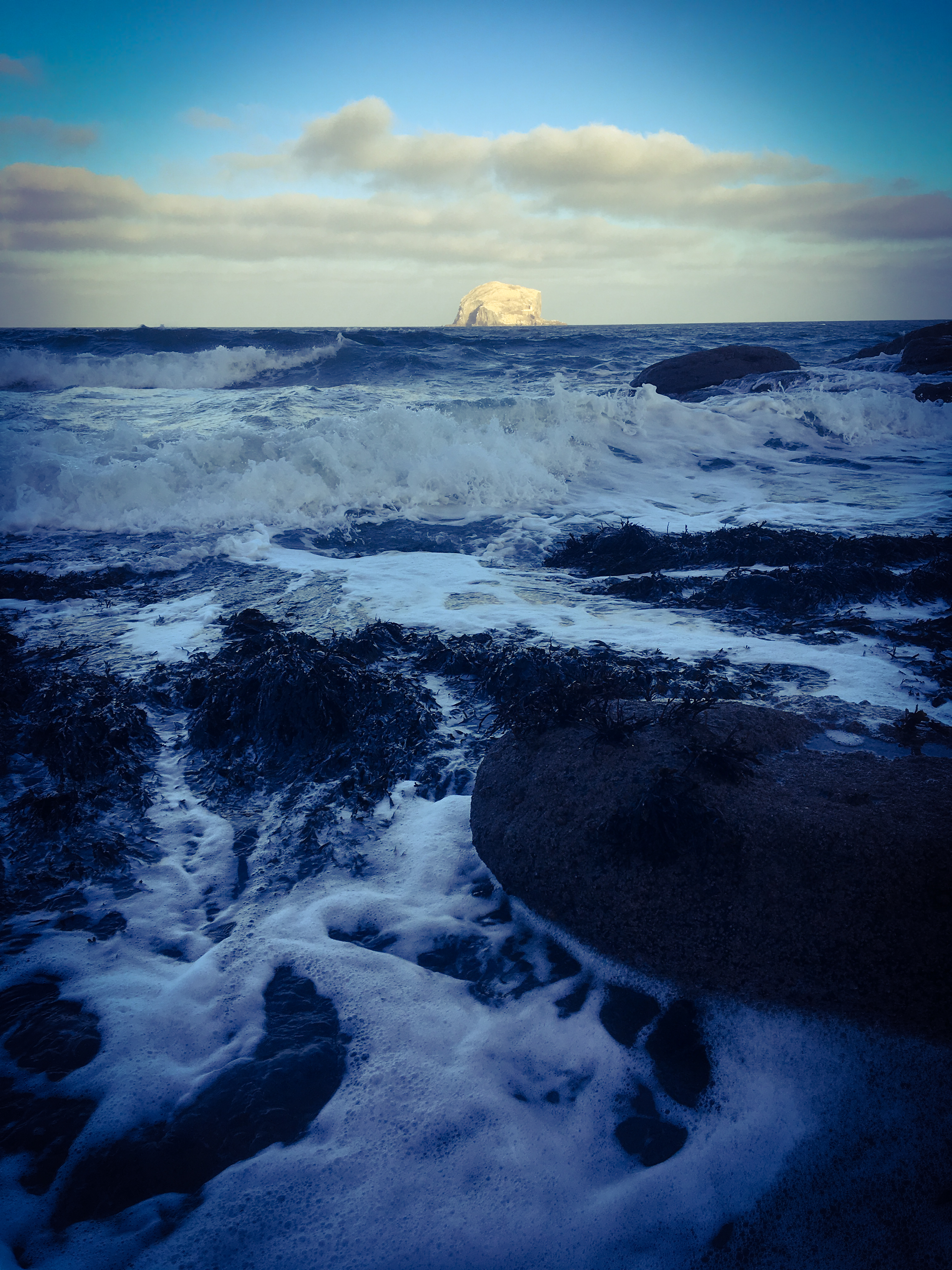
Bass Rock from Canty Bay, North Berwick

=== James Robertson ===
The Bass Rock is a key location in The Fanatic by Scottish author James Robertson. The novel tells the story of a tourist guide in modern-day Edinburgh who becomes obsessed with two characters from Edinburgh's past: Major Thomas Weir, a presbyterian who was eventually executed for incest, bestiality and witchcraft; and James Mitchell, a Covenanter who attempted to assassinate the Archbishop of St Andrews. Mitchell was tortured, imprisoned on the Bass Rock and eventually also executed.

=== Music ===
A pibroch was written by Iain Dall MacAoidh (MacKay), commemorating Neil Bhass' imprisonment and escape from the island, entitled "The Unjust Incarceration". It also featured as the cover photograph of the 1967 album "Gateway to the Forth" by Jimmy Shand & his Band.

=== Film ===
The Bass Rock appears as background in the title song sequence of the 1998 Bollywood film Kuch Kuch Hota Hai.

== See also ==
- List of islands of Scotland
- List of places in East Lothian
- Canty Bay
