= Robert Ross (preacher) =

Religious life
- Religion: Christianity
- School: Presbyterianism

Robert Ross was a Presbyterian preacher. He did not have a government licence to preach. He was apprehended at Leith and sent to the Bass Rock. He was kept in confinement there for upwards of three months from April 4-July 19, 1679.

== Preaching and imprisonment ==
Robert Ross was called a preacher by Wodrow. He was probably licensed by some of the ejected nonconforming ministers. He is mentioned by Alexander Reid in his Memoirs, p. 26. as one of those who, after the battle of Pentland Hills, preached in the fields, and who, when preaching in that public manner was made a capital offence, still persevered in addressing, both by night and by day, the multitudes who assembled to hear the gospel. His name, spelled Rosse, first occurs in the Records of the Privy Council in 1674. On 4 June, the Council authorised the Lord Chancellor to give orders to parties of that troop of horse of his Majesty's guards, under his command, to apprehend a considerable number of ministers, among whom Ross is included, and offer a reward of a thousand merks to such as should apprehend him. Early in the year 1679, he and Mr James Macaulay, also a preacher, and another person who was under hiding for nonconformity, were apprehended in Leith.) The Committee of Council for Public Affairs agreed that he and Macaulay should be sent to the Bass, and this report was approved of by the Council at their meeting on 4 April. He however continued a prisoner there only between three and four months, being liberated in July, simply upon condition of his finding security, under a certain sum, to appear before the Council when called.
