= John Spreul (town clerk) =

17th c. Glasgow Town Clerk

Mr. John Spreul
- Born: Surname is sometimes spelled "Spreull" or "Sprewll"; 1616; Glasgow
- Died: 1690 (aged 73–74)
- Education: University of Glasgow
- Title: Mr. (being a graduate)
- Spouse: Catherine Merchel (17 November 1640)
- Children: 12+

John Spreul (born 1616) was a town clerk in Glasgow who was educated at the University of Glasgow, where he completed his Master of Arts degree in 1635. His father was the Provost of Renfrew and an MP for Renfrew. After university, he thought about becoming a church minister but could not, in good conscience, sign the Five Articles of Perth. He was converted after hearing a sermon from David Dickson in 1644. He was a writer which is a Scottish term for a lawyer. For example William Lin is described as a Writer to the Signet which would make him a senior lawyer. He became unpopular with some Glaswegian magistrates because of his opposition to Hugh Binning. According to rumours, he potentially fought for the Covenanters at the Battle of Kilsyth. Spreul and John Graham fought together at the Battle of Philiphaugh in September 1645. Spreul became town clerk of Glasgow on 21 October 1645. He fought for the Scottish Covenanters in the Battle of Dunbar. He is reported to have had a very long beard and to have been mocked for it before the Privy Council of Scotland.

== Imprisonment ==
On 14 September 1660, Spreul was imprisoned in Edinburgh, along with Provost John Graham, for refusing to subscribe to the bond condemning the Western Remonstrance. However, he was then induced to subscribe to it, at which point he was released. Spreul and Graham had worked together and fought together. They both represented Glasgow during the time of Oliver Cromwell's rule.

== Banishment ==
After being banished from Scotland for nonconformity, he lived for some years at Berwick-upon-Tweed and Newcastle before residing Holland, where he remained for several years.

== Return to Scotland ==
An elderly and frail Spreul returned to Scotland, hoping to remain at home in peace. However, the government, instigated by the bishops, had him imprisoned at the Tollbooth of Edinburgh. He refused to hear the curates. He was therefore sent to the Bass Rock by the Privy Council on 28 July 1683, where he lay for some years. After petitioning to the council to be more compassionate towards his old age and frailty, an order was issued for his liberation, and he died within a year or two.

== Relatives ==
James Richard Sproule wrote an extensive study on the Spreul family, in which he distinguished John Spreul from his "cousin" or relative John Spreul, an apothecary:

A difficulty in presenting the story of Mr. John Spreull, Town Clerk of Glasgow, is that for a portion of his life there is the danger of confusing him with his "cousin"*, another John Spreull, an apothecary of Paisley and then an apothecary and merchant of Glasgow. The latter became known as "Bass John". The fact that the town clerk had a son also named John and that there was another John Spreull who was a merchant of Glasgow adds further complications. (p 86)

James Sproule continues:

When original documents speak of "Mr. John Spreull", it is as good as certain that the records refer to the town clerk. Again if the records speak of John Spreull "Senior" or John Spreull "the Elder", and additionally state that he was a "writer" (lawyer), there is little doubt that the references are about the town clerk. His son, John, who was also a writer, can be distinguished from his father when he is designated as "Junior" or "the Younger". "Bass John" is readily identifiable when he is identified as an apothecary or a merchant of Glasgow. The other John Spreull who was a merchant of Glasgow seems to have led a very quiet life, so he is naturally named less frequency in any records.

Perhaps understandably, Thomas Howell, in his Cobbett's complete collection of state trials..., seems to conflate the two at times.

== Works ==
- Some Remarkable Passages of the Lord's Providence towards Mr John Spreul. 1635–1664. Edinburgh. 1832.
