= John Stewart (minister) =

17th c. parish minister

- John Stewart of Bredochmilne

Personal details
- Died: 6 May 1692
- Denomination: Presbyterian (Church of Scotland, Covenanter)
- Spouse: Christian Arbuthnot
- Children: Margaret, Elizabeth
- Education: King's College, Aberdeen

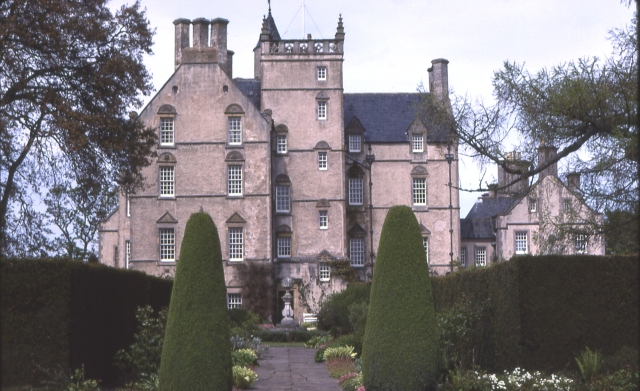
Innes House

John Stewart was a 17th-century Scottish minister.

== Early life ==
He graduated from The University and King's College of Aberdeen, Scotland in 1649. He was licensed as a minister on 5 April 1654 in the Presbytery of Deer in the Synod of Aberdeen. He was admitted to Crimond by the Protesting Presbytery on 10 April 1655. His headquarters may have been in the neighbourhood of Innes House.

== Career ==
On the establishment of Prelacy, Stewart was removed from his post for nonconformity.

In 1657, the Synod of Aberdeen declared him "an unparalleled intruder" and ordered him to cease his ministry. They deposed him in October 1658. The Protesters refused to remove him because they judged him to be "a godly and able man." Nevertheless, the Synod removed him on 20 April 1660.

Twenty-five years later, on 30 January 1685, he was libeled before a Committee of Council, which at that time had been sent to meet at Elgin in Murray Shire to prosecute locals guilty of church disorders. He was charged with keeping "conventicles, withdrawing from the ordinances, preaching seditious doctrine, plotting against the government, supplying and harboring rebels, and other public crimes and irregularities".

When examined on 2 February 1685, he stated under oath that he had not kept his own parish church for eighteen or nineteen years and that he had preached in his own family, and in private houses. He denied all the other articles of the libel. He testified to having conducted a marriage: he "deponed that he married Alexander Campbell, in Calder's-land, with Lilias Dunbar, who had been the Lady Innes's servant before the indemnity."

For this confession and that he refused to take the oath of allegiance, on 4 February 1685 he was sentenced to banishment from his Majesty's dominions and transported as a prisoner to the Tolbooth of Edinburgh. Instead of banishment, upon his arrival in the south, he was imprisoned in the Bass, where he stayed until liberated by the Council on 21 June 1686.

After the Restoration, he became minister in Elgin in 1687 and in Urquhart after 10 May 1691.

== Personal life ==
He married Christian Arbuthnot, sister of John Arbuthnot of Cairngall in Longside, and had daughters, including Margaret (who married Alexander Forbes, minister of Dyke) and Elizabeth. He died on 6 May 1692.

== Bibliography ==
- Anderson's Bass Rock, 373
- Dickson's Emeralds chased in Gold, 232
- Wodrow's History, iv., 192
- Macdonald's The Covenanters in Moray and Ross, 104.
- Porteus's The Scottish Patmos
