= Peter Kid =

17th-century Presbyterian minister

Personal life
- Born: Fife, Scotland
- Died: ca. 1694
- Resting place: Carluke
- Education: University of St Andrews

Religious life
- Religion: Christianity
- School: Presbyterianism

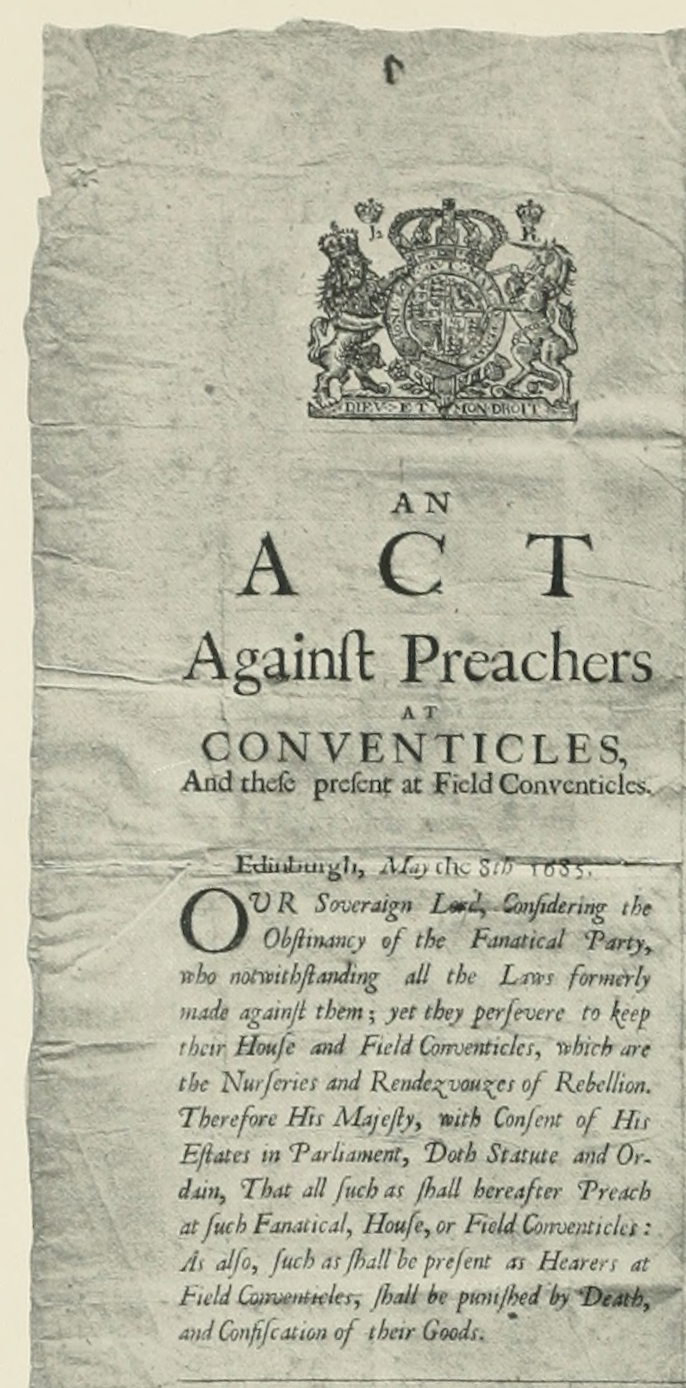
The Scottish Parliament on 8 May 1685, have recorded the following : Our sovereign Lord, considering the obstinacy of the fanatical party who, notwithstanding all the laws formerly made against them, still keep their house and field conventicles, which are the nurseries and rendezvouses of rebellion; therefore His Majesty, with consent of Parliament, ordains that all such persons who shall hereafter preach at such house or field conventicles, also those who shall be present as hearers, shall be punished by death and confiscation of their goods.

Peter Kid was a 17th-century Presbyterian minister. He was possibly a native of Fife.

== Ministry ==
He graduated with an M.A. from St Andrews University in 1650. He was ordained (by the Protesting Party) to Douglas in 1654. He was deprived of his office by an Act of Parliament 11 June, and Decreet of Privy Council in Glasgow 1 October 1662. He became the indulged minister of Carluke along with Alexander Livingstone of Biggar on 3 September 1672. For refusing to observe the Anniversary of the Restoration of Charles II and to join in the National Thanksgiving for His Majesty's deliverance from the Rye-house Plot, he was summoned before the Privy Council, 8 July 1673, and again 11 August 1677, when he was fined in one-half times his stipend. For a similar offence his indulgence was withdrawn, on 8 October 1684, and he was ordered to leave the country. He further declined (unlike everyone else on that day) to come under any obligation not to preach without a licence from the Government, and was sent to the Bass Rock where he remained a prisoner from May 1685 to 21 September 1686. Owing to infirmity, Kid petitioned the Privy Council to set him free; at the same time agreeing to live privately, in his own house and to abstain from preaching. On these conditions the Committee granted order and warrant for his release. Wodrow says he was eminent in the gift of prayer. Kid is recorded as sometimes being so caught up in prayer that he forgot himself and used up all the time he should have preached.

He was living at Waygateshaw, Carluke, 28 May 1687, as appears from a bond in his favour of that date. It is uncertain whether he returned to Douglas or not, or if he survived the Revolution. James Gibson and Charles Rogers say he died in 1694. He was buried at Carluke.

== Other names ==
He was called Francis Kid in Baillie's Letters.

== Epitaph ==
Peter Kid originally had a tablestone inscription much like that of John Blackadder. This was replaced in 2014 by an upright stone.
A faithful, holy pastor here lies hid—
One of a thousand — Mr Peter Kid:

Firm as a stone, but of a heart contrite,
A wrestling, praying, weeping Israelite.

A powerful preacher, far from ostentation,
A son of thunder and of consolation.

His face, his speech, and humble walk might tell
That he was in the Mount and Peniel.

He was in Patmos, and did far surpass
In fixed steadfastness the Rocky Bass.

His love to Christ made his life to be spent
In feeding flocks and kids beside his tent.

His frail flesh could not equal paces keep
With his most willing spirit, but fell asleep.

His soul's in heaven, where it was much before,
His flesh rests here in hopes of future glore.

Passenger! ere thou go, sigh, weep, and pray—
Help, Lord, because the godly do decay.

== Family ==
He married Susanna (died March 1697), daughter of Sir John Cheisley of Kersewell, and had children — John; Elizabeth; Anna; Grizell, who were served heirs, 17 February 1694.

== Bibliography ==
- Wodrow's Analecta, iii., 120
- Tombstone
- Bass Rock, 375
- Rankin's Carluke, 69
- Irving's Upper Ward, ii., 404
- G. R. Sasines, xxxix., 233
- G. R. Inhibitions, 3 November 1663.
