= James Drummond (chaplain) =

Scottish preacher

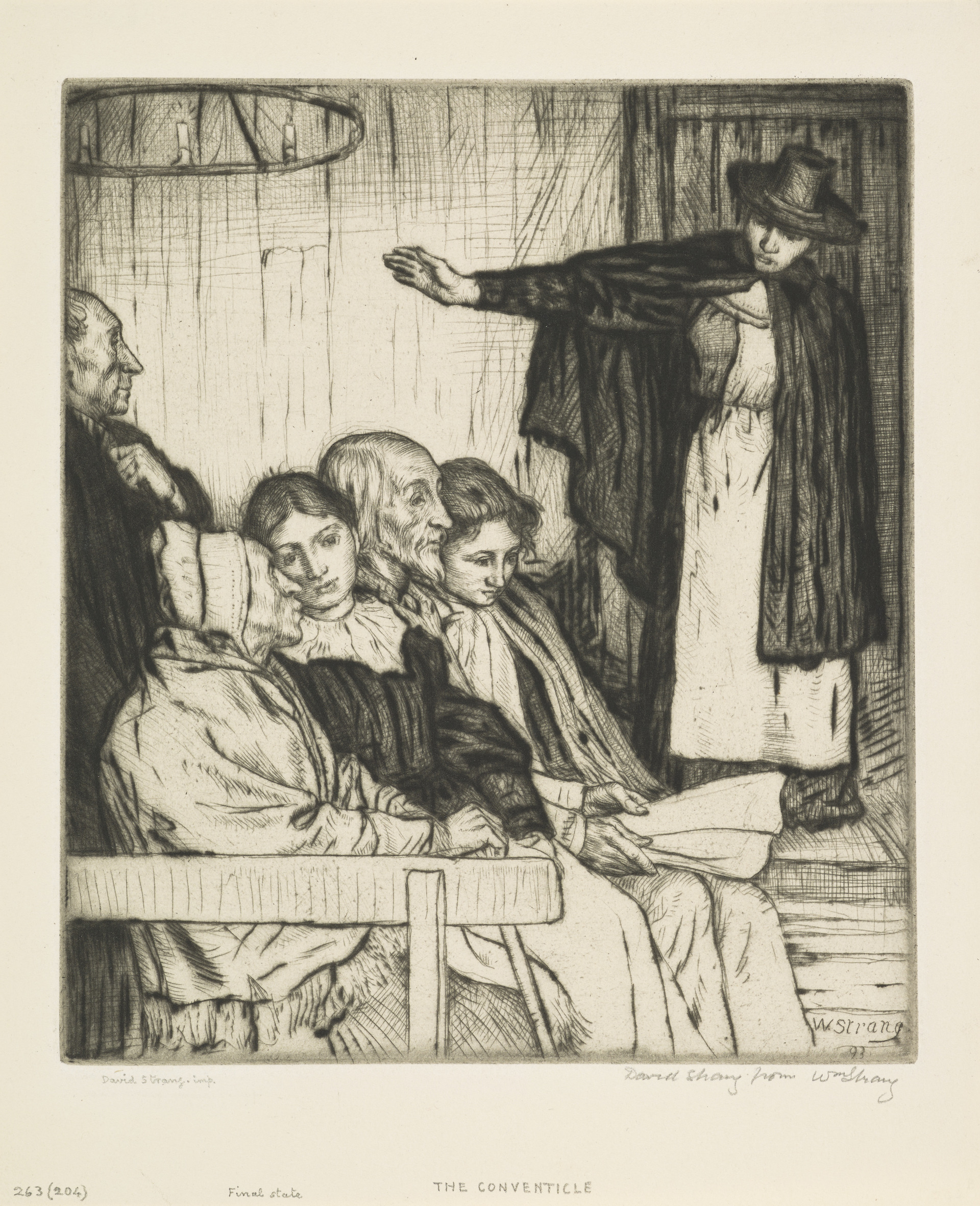
- The Conventicle by William Strang
- Church: Church of Scotland

Personal details
- Born: James Drummond
- Died: 29 September 1699 Kilconquhar, Fife
- Denomination: Presbyterian

James Drummond was a seventeenth century Scottish covenanting field preacher. He was imprisoned on Bass Rock for around nine months. At the time of his incarceration his occupation was listed as chaplain to Margaret, Marchioness of Argyll.

== Legal trouble ==
Drummond was first jailed in the tolbooth in Edinburgh in 1674, after he was arrested and imprisoned for preaching house and field conventicles. He stayed in prison a short time because he confessed and assured the committee that he would not continue. He was given a conditional discharge on 21 July 1674.

He was re-arrested in Glasgow and summoned to appear before a committee of the Privy Council in Edinburgh. This time he refused to avoid holding conventicles and so was jailed on the Bass Rock from 28 January 1677 until 5 October 1677, when he was given a conditional release to Kilmarnock and afterwards to Kintyre. He attended the General Meeting of Presbyterian ministers after the Toleration, on 6 July 1687. In 1688 it was reported to the council that he had been preaching in a malt barn near Stow.

== After the Revolution ==
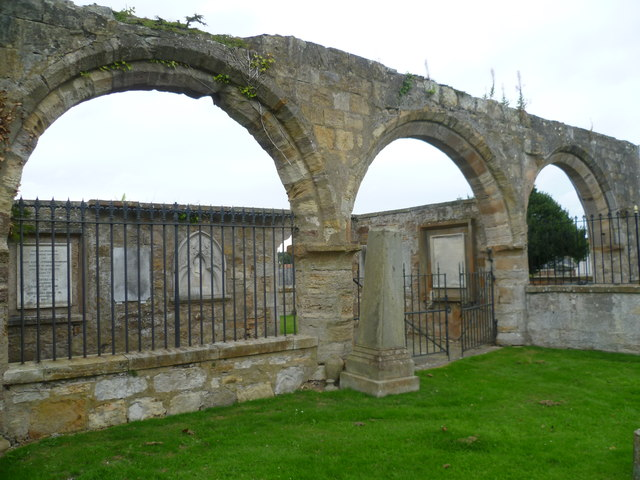
Ruins of the old Kilconquhar parish kirk

After the Glorious Revolution, Drummond began preaching in Kilconquhar, Fife towards the end of March 1691. On 25 June 1691 he was called to be the minister there, and continued until his death on 29 September 1699. For his last year, Drummond’s health rendered him unable to discharge his ministerial work. “Frequently there was no lecture but only one sermon on the Sabbaths, ‘the minister not being in very good health.’ At the visitation of the Presbytery in 1698 he complained that his charge was weighty and heavy; and, that he had neither ability nor mynd to discharge his duty as he wold. To which it was answered that it was not in the power of the Presbytery to make his charge lighter, and that he behooved to look for his furnitur from the Lord, who is able to strengthen his weak servants in the acceptable discharge of their duty.”

== Family life ==
He married Mary Montgomery, who survived him, and had children — Mary, and others.
