= Sir Hugh Campbell =

Baronet of Cessnock

Sir Hugh Campbell Bt
- Title: Baronet of Cessnock

Personal life
- Born: March 1615 Cessnock, Ayrshire
- Died: 20 September 1686 (aged 71) Edinburgh
- Resting place: Greyfriars Kirkyard

Religious life
- Religion: Christianity
- School: Presbyterianism

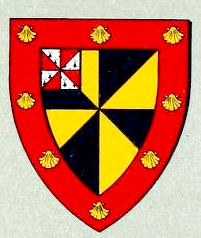
arms of Sir Hugh Campbell of Cessnock

Sir Hugh Campbell (March 1615 – 20 September 1686) was a baronet of Cessnock in Ayrshire. His lineage was from the Campbells of Loudoun.

Sir Hugh was the MP for Ayrshire in the Parliament of Scotland from 1639 to 1641 and again from 1645 to 1647 and from 1649 to 1650. He was appointed to, but turned down, the posts of Lord Justice Clerk and Lord of Session by the Scottish Parliament in 1649. He was succeeded by Sir George Campbell of Cessnock, his son.

He was reportedly arrested after the Battle of Rullion Green in 1666. His house was in Galston.

He was tried for high treason in March 1684 for being part of the rising at Bothwell Bridge. A not proven verdict was returned but nevertheless he and his son were imprisoned on the Bass Rock on the Firth of Forth in Haddingtonshire. The order for his transport from the Tolbooth is dated 15 September 1684. It apparently took about 4 days to put into effect. He was sent at the same time as John Rae but neither Rae nor Hugh's son Sir George Campbell were permitted to ride in a coach or on a horse someone provided.

In 1685 Hugh and his son were accused of accession to the Rye House Plot. This was a plot for the assassination of Charles II. and the elevation of his illegitimate son, by Lucy Walters, the Duke of Monmouth, to the throne. Although the proof failed, Parliament adjudged them guilty. Their lives were spared, but an act of attainder was taken out against them, by which their lands passed to the Crown and themselves again committed prisoners to the Bass. On 13 June 1685 notice of his forfeiture and that of his son were recorded. Both Campbells were released on 6 August 1685 but later re-arrested.

He was released from the Bass to die in Edinburgh and was buried in Greyfriars Kirkyard on 23 September 1686.
