= James Macaulay (footballer) =

Scottish footballer

Personal information
- Full name: James Austin Russel Macauley
- Date of birth: 19 October 1922
- Place of birth: Edinburgh, Scotland
- Date of death: November 2000 (aged 78)
- Place of death: Romford, London, England
- Height: 1.75 m (5 ft 9 in)
- Position: Wing-half

Senior career*
Years	Team	Apps	(Gls)
1946–1951	Chelsea	86	(5)
1951–1952	Aldershot Town	31	(3)
Total		117	(8)
- * Club domestic league appearances and goals

James Austin Russel Macauley (19 October 1922 – November 2000) was a Scottish footballer who played as a wing-half.

== Club career ==
Macauley played as a midfielder for Chelsea, amassing 86 league appearances, with five goals. He played in the 1947 FA Cup, in a 2–0 win over Arsenal in front of 183,135 spectators.
