= William Lin =

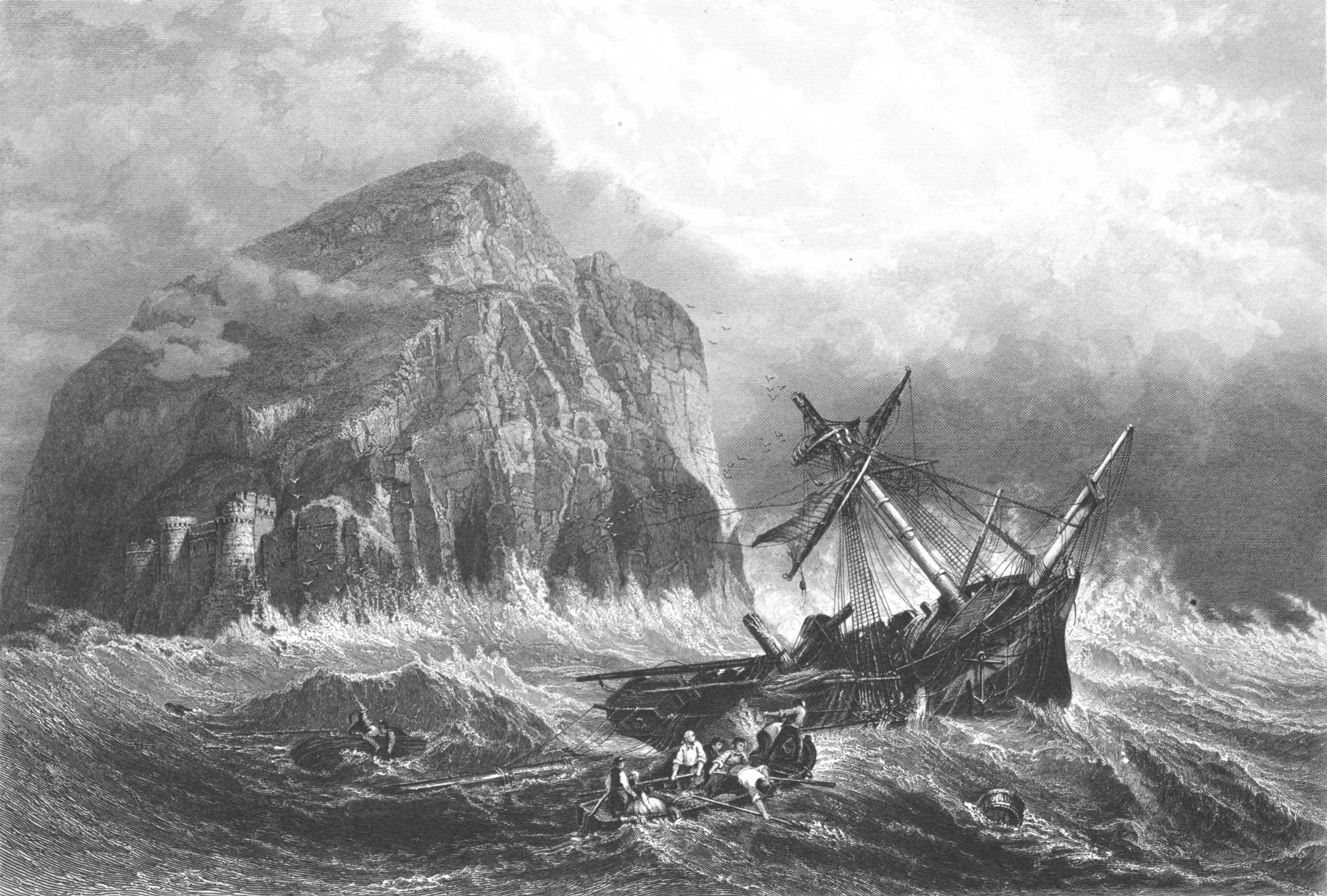
- The Bass Rock from the Scots Worthies Wylie edition

Religious life
- Religion: Christianity
- School: Presbyterianism

William Lin or William Line was a 17th-century Presbyterian lawyer (called a writer) from Scotland. Phillimore calls him a Writer to the Signet which would make him a senior lawyer. He may have been from in or around Kirklistoun.

== Legal trouble ==
He was indicted, early in August, 1681, before a Committee of the Privy Council on a threefold charge: 1. Attending field conventicles and listening to ministers who were declared “traitors.” 2. Harbouring such ministers. 3. Corresponding with them. In proof of this last charge, it is said, that "upon one of the rebels, when taken and examined, were found particular letters addressed to him". This triple indictment was referred to his oath. Refusing to depone, Lin was fined in the sum of £500 sterling and ordained to be kept a prisoner in the Bass until the fine was paid; and, longer should the Council deem fit. The preachers which Lin and Spreul listened to are listed as: "Mr John Welsh, Mr Donald Cargile, Mr Samuel Arnot, Mr David Williamson, Mr Thomas Forrester, Mr Richard Cameron, Mr David Barclay, Mr David Home, and others." Period of incarceration uncertain. He was sent to the Bass Rock on the same day as John Spreul (apothecary), the covenanter with the longest known sentence on the prison island of the Forth. When he was released was uncertain.
