= Alexander Forrester (minister) =

Scottish minister (1611–1686)

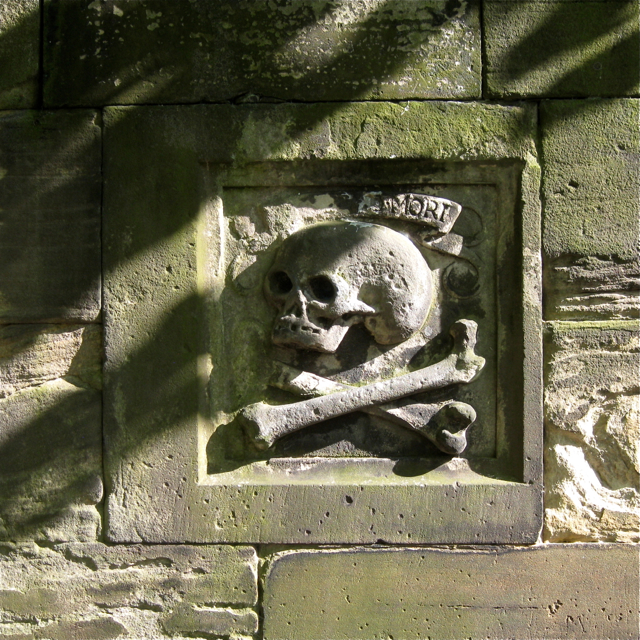
- Skull and Crossbones from the Forrester Enclosure of Greyfriars Kirkyard.

Personal life
- Born: 1611
- Died: 26 May 1686 (aged 74–75)
- Education: University of St Andrews

Religious life
- Religion: Christianity
- School: Presbyterianism

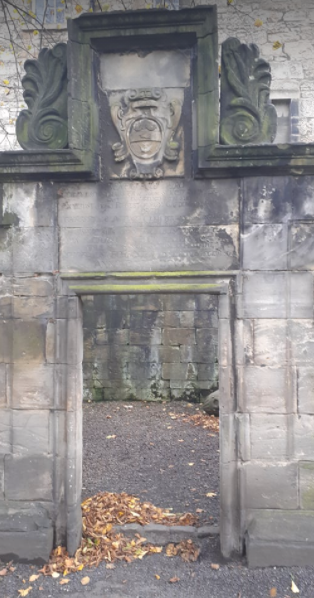
Doorway to the tomb of Alexander Forrester, Greyfriars Kirkyard

Alexander Forrester (1611–1686) was a Scottish minister.

== Life ==
He was born in 1611, son of Duncan Forrester and his wife, Margaret Ramsay. He was descended from the Forresters of Garden. He graduated with an M.A. degree from St Andrews University in 1631. He had been "ane conformist in Ireland, preached three quarters of a year in Edinburgh, and been two years with the armie". He was proposed for the parish of Livingston in 1646 but settled in the parish of St Mungo in Dumfriesshire in 1650. Refusing to conform to Episcopacy in 1662, he was confined to the parish. He was apprehended for holding a conventicle. He acted as clerk to a General Meeting of Presbyterian ministers in Edinburgh, 24 May 1676.

He was apprehended while preaching the Gospel in Fife, was imprisoned in St Andrews, and, on 3 August 1676, sentenced to the Bass. Released on giving caution to appear when called, a paper found on his person revealed that on 25 May 1676, fifty-three outed ministers met for conference at Edinburgh, and took measures to maintain correspondence throughout the church in the wilderness, and to have young men brought forward for and sent out in the work of the ministry. As Mr Forrester would reveal nothing as to place or persons, he was anew sentenced to imprisonment in the Edinburgh Tolbooth "in a chamber by himself, that no person have access to him except with meat and drink, and that he be not allowed the use of pen, ink, or paper."

He was examined by the Privy Council of Scotland on 8 February 1677, indicted upon the more serious charge of "sedition" — which, however was entirely groundless — and adjudged to imprisonment in the Tolbooth of Edinburgh. A lengthy quotation of the Council's minutes is given by Anderson.

He was imprisoned on the Bass Rock on 3 August 1677. Having been liberated, he died at Edinburgh on 28 May 1686. He is buried in Greyfriars Kirkyard in a vault on the main south wall.

== Family ==
He married Christian Macneil, daughter of Torquil Macneil, and had children —

- Alexander;
- John, (medical doctor) minister of Stirling 1696 to 1703;
- James, advocate, died 1705;
- William, Society of Writers to Her Majesty's Signet, died 1 October 1701;
- Elizabeth;
- Barbara, died aged 18;
- Christian (married 12 January 1693, George Murray of Murraythwaite).

== Bibliography ==
- Dumfries and Linlithgow Presbytery Regs.
- Dumfries Tests.
- Edinburgh Reg. (Bur.)
- Wodrow's History, ii., 355 [where he is called Andrew]
- Monteith's Theater of Mortality, i.
- Bass Bock
- Greyfriars Graveyard
