= James Fraser of Brea =

17th c. parish minister

- The Bass where James Fraser was imprisoned
- Church: Church of Scotland

Personal details
- Born: 29 July 1639 Kirkmichael, Ross-shire
- Died: 13 September 1699 (aged 60) Edinburgh
- Denomination: Presbyterian
- Education: Marischal College, Aberdeen

James Fraser of Brea (29 July 1639 – 13 September 1699) was a Scottish Presbyterian minister. A supporter of the Scottish Reformation, he refused to follow the episcopal church of the king of England, and preached as a Covenanter; he was arrested for treason twice and imprisoned on Bass Rock.

== Early life ==
Fraser was born in the parish of Kirkmichael, Ross-shire, on 29 July 1639. His father, Sir James Fraser, was the second son of Simon Fraser, 6th Lord Lovat, by his second wife, Jane Stewart, daughter of James Stewart, 1st Lord Doune. Sir James Fraser, a devout man, was elder for the presbytery of Inverness in the general assembly of 1638 which abolished episcopacy, and sat in several other general assemblies.

Fraser was educated at a grammar school, and suffered much from his father's financial difficulties. At the Siege of Inverness his father Sir James Fraser held Inverness Castle for the Covenanters of the Clan Fraser of Lovat against the royalist James Graham, 1st Marquess of Montrose.

In 1658 he graduated MA from Marischal College, Aberdeen and then began to study Law. However he abandoned his study of the law, and obtained license as a preacher of the gospel as a Presbyterian minister in 1672 by the presbytery of Moray.

== First imprisonment ==
Coming under the notice of Archbishop Sharp as a preacher at conventicles, he was ordered to be apprehended in 1674; decreets and letters of inter-communing were passed against him 6 August 1675. He was summoned before the council 29 Jan. 1676–7, and ordered to be imprisoned on the Bass Rock the next day. He was escorted to the Bass by twelve horsemen and thirty foot. Here he remained two years and a half, being released on giving security for good behaviour in July 1679. He was depressed by the sudden death of his wife in October 1676, and by the many troubles of the time, as well as by his imprisonment. He yet found material for recording in his diary many matters that called for gratitude. While in prison he studied Hebrew and Greek, and gained some knowledge of oriental languages. He was released on payment of £560 in July 1679 by Sir Hugh Campbell of Cawdor.

He wrote also a treatise on justifying faith, of which many editions have been printed. Some of its views in favour of a universal reference in the work of Christ were strongly objected to by certain of his brethren who saw it in manuscript, and it was not till 1722 that the first part was published, the second appearing in 1749.

== Second Imprisonment ==
In December 1681 he was again arrested and committed to Blackness Castle as a prisoner until he paid a fine of five thousand marks and gave security either to give up preaching or quit the kingdom. A brother-in-law caused the fine to be remitted, and Fraser was sent out of Scotland.

== Later life ==
On 21 July 1683 he was ordered to be imprisoned for six months in Newgate, London, for refusing the Oxford Oath. By 6 July 1687 he was back in Scotland, and was living in the bounds of Lothian and Tweeddale. In 1689 he was minister of Culross, Fife, where he exercised his ministry with diligence and earnestness. He was a member of the assemblies of 1690 and 1692, and had a call to take charge of a congregation at Inverness in September 1696.

He died in Edinburgh on 13 September 1699. The only graveyard available at this time was Greyfriars Kirkyard.

== Theology ==
James Fraser is noted for a doctrine of universal atonement although he did not think that all would be saved.

In 1753 there was a Breach in the Reformed Presbyterian Church Synod following the publication of Fraser's book, A Treatise on Justifying Faith, which he had written while a prisoner on the Bass Rock. The Amyraldian view of the atonement was commended by a number of ministers who for a while set up their own Synod. The theology also caused no small commotion in the Antiburgher Church and Thomas Mair was ejected.

== Personal life ==
Fraser was married twice;

(1) 31 July 1672, Isobel Gray (died October 1676), daughter of Sir William Gray of Pittendrum, and widow of William Hamilton, merchant, Edinburgh. They had two daughters — Jean Fraser (married widower Hugh Bose of Kilravock), died without children; and Beatrice (married William Burnet, minister of Falkirk)

(2) Christian (died about 1696), daughter of John Inglis, minister of Hamilton, and widow of Alexander Carmichael, minister of Pettinain. They had no children.

== Bibliography ==
- A Defence of the Convention of Estates (1689)
- Prelacy an Idol, and Prelates Idolaters, a sermon (? Edinburgh, 1713; Glasgow, 1724)
- Meditations on Several Subjects in Divinity (Edinburgh, 1721)
- A Treatise concerning Justifying or Saving Faith, 2 vols. (Edinburgh, 1722–49)
- Some Choice Select Meditations (Edinburgh, 1726; Glasgow, 1753) [edited by James Hog of Carnock]
- Memoirs of the Life of Sir James Fraser of Brea, written by Himself (Edinburgh, 1738; Aberdeen, 1776; Glasgow, 1798; Aberdeen, 1843; Inverness, 1889) [with Introductory Note by Alexander Whyte, D.D., and Biographical Sketch by Gustavus Aird, D.D.]
- The Lawfulness and Duty of Separation from Corrupt Ministers and Churches Vindicated (Edinburgh, 1744). — [Edin. Bur. Reg.; *Acts of Pari., ix., App. 22
- Wodrow's Hist.
- Wodrow's Analecta
- Boston's Memoirs, 40
- Anderson's Bass Rock
- Family of Kilravock
- Walker's Theology and Theologians of Scotland
- Edin. Christ. Instr., xxiii.
- Select Biog., ii. [Wodrow Soc] (Edinburgh, 1847)
- John Brown's The Christian, the Student, and Pastor (Edinburgh, 1781)
- King's The Covenanters in the North, 375-90
- The Covenanters in Moray and Ross, 104
- Gen. Peg. Sas., lxiii., 186
- Whyte's James Fraser -, Laird of Brea (Edinburgh, 1911) See Also
- Elder Cumming's Holy Men of God
- Beveridge's Fife Bibliography, 148-9; Dictionary of National Biography
