= Summerhill, Dumfries =

Residential area in Dumfries, Scotland

Coordinates: 55°04′10″N 3°37′53″W

Summerhill in Dumfries is a post war residential suburb on the west side of the town. It is located on the Maxwelltown side of the River Nith that runs through Dumfries. Summerhill is bounded by Terregles Road to the north, the streets that branch off Ellisland Drive to the east, the Dumfries and Galloway Golf Club to the south and west and also to the west by the disused Maxwelltown train station.

== Housing ==
The suburb consists primarily, but not exclusively, of a mixture of terraced houses and blocks of three storey flats.

Most of the streets in Summerhill were given names with connotations associated with Scotland's national poet Robert Burns. Burns lived in Dumfries for his last years and died there in 1796. Examples of the Burns influenced street names in Summerhill are Afton Drive, Armour Drive, Ballochmyle Terrace, Campbell Avenue, Doon Terrace, Ellisland Drive, Gilbert Circle, Glencairn Road, Mauchline Terrace and Mossgiel Avenue.

The housing capacity of Summerhill was increased in the 90s with the creation of 3 additional streets.

== Terregles Road ==
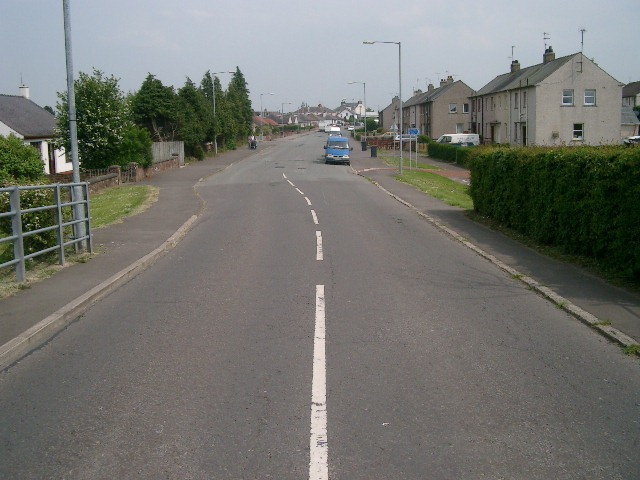
Terregles Road in Dumfries facing east from the hump back bridge

As the name suggests Terregles Road forms part of the spoke from Dumfries leading to the village of Terregles approximately 2 miles further west from Summerhill. When Summerhill housing estate was originally completed the visible marker connecting the urban area of Dumfries and the rural areas beyond was the hump back railway bridge on Terregles Road. In the 1990s the urban boundary moved further west with the development of a new housing estate beyond the bridge. Terregles Road was also home to the offices and yard of Haley's builders before Haley's demise.

The terraced houses on the council built Southern side of Terregles Road contain 4-bedroom gable end houses. As such the 4-bedroom houses were used by the council for housing the biggest families in Summerhill. The numbers of the 4-bedroom gable end houses are 3, 9, 11, 25, 27, 33, 35, 41, 43, 57, 59 and 65.

Terregles Road is a continuation of Terregles Street. Terregles Street is home to Palmerston Park of Queen of the South F.C.

== Boundary with Dumfries and Galloway Golf Club ==
The Dumfries and Galloway Golf Club is the only golf club in Dumfries on the Maxwelltown side of the River Nith. It is the area around the 2nd and 5th holes and the 6th tee on the course that partially hem in Summerhill. The 2nd and the 5th are the only par 5 holes of the 18 on the course. Golf Avenue is the longer and older of the 2 streets in Summerhill adjacent to the golf course. Golfers playing the par 4 6th are required to negotiate a burn (small stream) that runs most of the length of the hole. The burn eventually runs into the nearby Cargen Pow, a tributary of the Nith.

== Transport ==
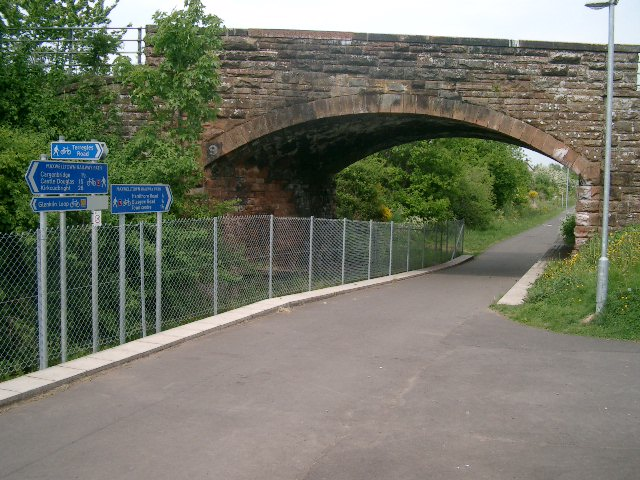
Terregles Road hump back bridge and the cycle path that replaced the railway line

The line from Dumfries through Maxwelltown railway station on the periphery of Summerhill to Castle Douglas and beyond was closed to passengers in the 1960s as part of the Beeching axe, leading to the closure of the station itself as it no longer had a purpose. The line through the station continued to be used for several more years to carry chemical tankers to and from the Imperial Chemical Industries factory just outside Dumfries at Cargenbridge, but has since been closed completely, with a cycle path now in its place.

Bus services 9 and 9A run between Dumfries town centre and Afton Drive in Summerhill. Bus service 373 between Dumfries and Shawhead runs along Terregles Road.

== Schools ==
Summerhill falls within the catchment area of Laurieknowe Primary School, which has a northerly entrance providing access to Summerhill pupils on James Avenue, accessible via Terregles Street. A Catholic school, St Teresa's Catholic School, is also located in the Lochside area of Dumfries.

Secondary schools whose catchment areas include Summerhill are Dumfries Academy, located over the River Nith in the town centre of Dumfries; Maxwelltown High School, located in the Lochside area of Dumfries; and the Catholic secondary school St, Joseph's College in the DG1 side of Dumfries.

Laurieknowe Primary School is adjacent to HM Prison Dumfries, located on Nelson Street. Neither the school nor the prison are in Summerhill.

== Recreation ==
There are currently two grassed recreational fields available: one at Doon Terrace which has historically suffered poor drainage and one at Ballochmyle Terrace. Additionally, a MUGA (Multi Use Games Area) was recently constructed on the grass at Ballochmyle Terrace. Until its replacement with housing the 90s, there was also a council-maintained grassed recreational field at the west end of Armour Drive and Golf Avenue.

The Community Centre located in Ballochmyle Terrace is also a significant source of recreation for a number of residents in the area, mainly young people. This includes hosting "The Base" youth group for young people aged 12–16 and a junior youth group aged 5–11.

== Public houses and licensed bars ==
Summerhill was once home to a licensed bar named The Palmerston Hotel. The Palmerston survived a fire and was renamed on more than one occasion (e.g. Sliquors, The Driveway) before closing its doors for the last time in the 90s. Its grounds were then used to build additional housing on a newly created street called Simpson Gardens.

Thus the hostelries typically (but not exclusively) used by people from Summerhill based on the pubs' proximity between the suburb and the town centre are The Spread Eagle, The Salutation, The Globe Inn (not to be confused with The Globe Inn on Dumfries High Street associated with Robert Burns) and The Devorgilla Lounge. All four are in the Market Street area only separated from Dumfries town centre by the River Nith. However, the nearest premises licensed to sell alcohol for consumption on site is the social club at Queen of the South FC's Palmerston Park.

== Dumfries Rugby Club ==
Summerhill was home to Dumfries Rugby Club until the club negotiated a move to Park Farm in 1953.

== See also ==
- List of places in Dumfries and Galloway
