= Newbridge Drive =

Coordinates: 55°05′13″N 3°38′03″W

Newbridge Drive is a relatively new suburb in Dumfries. It is situated on the Maxwelltown side of the River Nith and is approx 1.8 miles north-west from Dumfries town centre.

== Public transport ==
The area is served by the number 12 Dumfries town centre Bus which runs half-hourly.

== Schools ==
Newbridge Drive is one of the few areas in Dumfries that does not have a Primary School. The scheme is in the catchment area of Lincluden Primary School however, Lochside Primary School is also close to the area. The nearest Catholic primary schools are St.Ninians and St.Teresa's both of which are located in the Lochside area of the town.

== See also ==
- Dumfries
- List of places in Dumfries and Galloway
