= Nithraid =

The Nithraid is an annual sail, row boat race and festival held in the town of Dumfries, Scotland. Competitors race small boats up the River Nith from Carsethorn to Mill Green in the centre of Dumfries on the high tide. There are three bridges along the river that require boats to lower masts or even deliberately capsize to pass under.

A festival takes place at the finish line at Mill Green, with activities, acoustic music sets and local artists on show.

The Nithraid takes place in August/September each year, and has been running since 2013.

The 2016 Nithraid took place on 3 September and was won by Dave Golding.

The 2018 Nithraid took place on 11 August, and was won by Mark Zygadlo. The Salty Coo Procession was led by Dumfries based production and arts company ‘The Maddjakkalls'.

== The course ==
The Nithraid runs from Carsethorn in the Solway Firth, up the river Nith to Dumfries town centre, finishing at Mill Green next to The Caul (a weir).

== Origins ==
The Nithraid was created as a way to celebrate Dumfries' connection to the river Nith highlighting the way the Nith connected Dumfries to the rest of the world through trade, goods and sail power. Competing boats carry a small symbolic cargo up the river.

The winning crew have the right to launch the Salty Coo (a representation of a cow, covered in salt crystals) into the river, as a symbolic celebration of livestock and salt being important examples of commodities that were traded. Prior to the race, the Salty Coo is paraded through the town.

The Nithraid is organised by The Stove Network (Dumfries), a local artist-led collective.
