= Maxwelltown =

Coordinates: 55.065°N 3.620°W

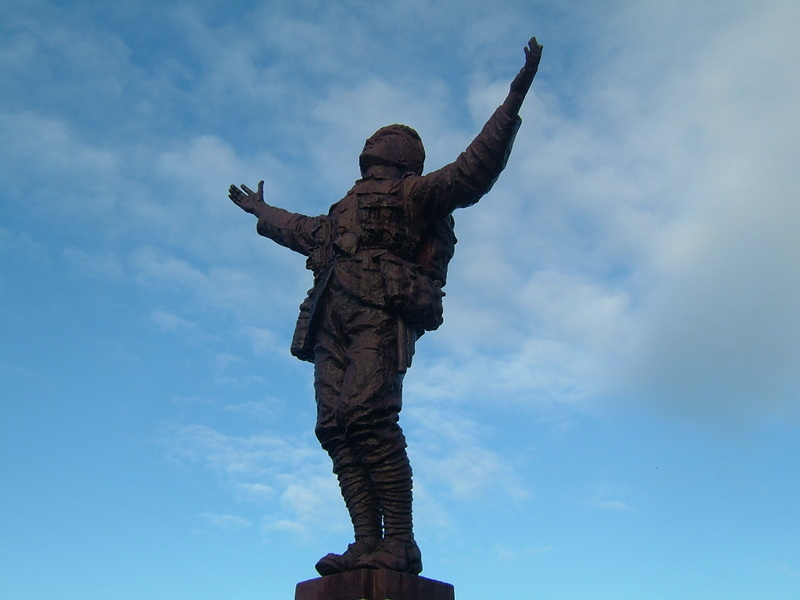
- Maxwelltown War Memorial
- Council area: Dumfries and Galloway
- Lieutenancy area: Dumfries
- Country: Scotland
- Sovereign state: United Kingdom
- Post town: Dumfries
- Postcode district: DG2
- Dialling code: 01387
- Police: Scotland
- Fire: Scottish
- Ambulance: Scottish
- UK Parliament: Dumfries and Galloway

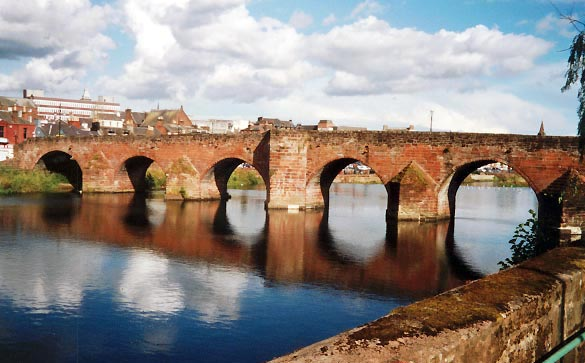
Devorgilla Bridge (c. 15th Century) spanning the Nith.

Maxwelltown (Scottish Gaelic: Ceann Drochaid, IPA:[ˈkʰʲaun̴̪ˈt̪ɾɔxətʲ]) was formerly a burgh of barony and police burgh and by the time of the burgh's abolition in 1929 it was the most populous burgh in the county of Kirkcudbrightshire, Scotland. In 1929 Maxwelltown was merged with the neighbouring burgh of Dumfries.

Maxwelltown lies to the west of the River Nith, which forms the historic boundary between Kirkcudbrightshire and Dumfriesshire. Maxwelltown was a hamlet known as Bridgend up until 1810, in which year it was made into a burgh of barony under its present name, later becoming a police burgh in 1833. Maxwelltown comprises several suburbs, including Summerhill, Troqueer, Janefield, Lochside, Lincluden, Sandside, and Summerville. The burgh of Maxwelltown straddled the two parishes of Terregles and Troqueer. In a referendum in 1928 the residents of Maxwelltown voted to join the burgh of Dumfries. The change took effect on 3 October 1929, and also transferred Maxwelltown from Kirkcudbrightshire to Dumfriesshire.

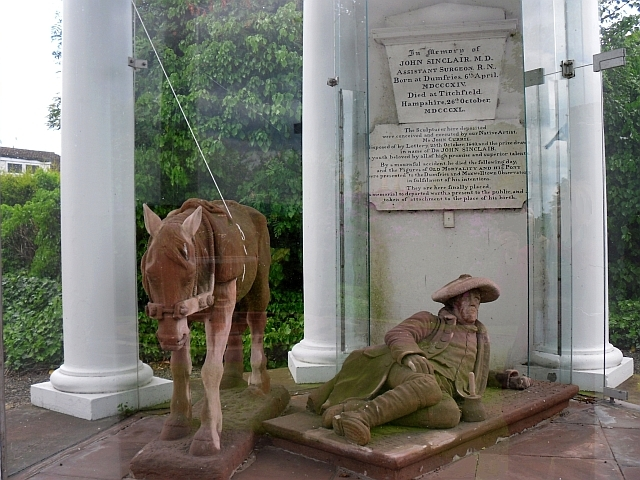
Statue of Old Mortality and his pony (The Sinclair Memorial)

The oldest remaining building within the Dumfries urban area is on the Maxwelltown side of the Nith, Lincluden Abbey. Queen of the South football ground is also on the Maxwelltown side. Some of the most notable local players for the club hail from the same side of the Nith, including Ian Dickson, Billy Houliston and Ted McMinn. Other buildings of note are the former Dumfries Mill, now the Robert Burns Centre, with visitor centre, museum, film theatre and restaurant. Dumfries Museum and Observatory and the Camera Obscura are further up on the hill as is the Sinclair Memorial. The former Benedictine Convent of the Immaculate Conception stands on a prominent position on Corbelly Hill. HMP Dumfries is at Jessiefield and the former Maxwelltown Burgh Court House is now flats. Maxwelltown railway station in the Summerhill area on the Castle Douglas and Dumfries Railway closed in 1965.
