= Ross (name) =

- Gender: Male
- Language: Gaelic

Origin
- Origin: Scotland
- Meaning: Promontory or Headland

Other names
- Related names: Joss; Moss

Ross is an English-language name derived from Gaelic, most commonly used in Scotland. It is also the name of a county in the highland area (Ross and Cromarty). It can be used as a given name, typically for males, but is also a typical family name for people of Scottish descent (Clan Ross). Derived from the Gaelic for a "promontory" or "headland".

== People with the surname ==
=== A ===
- Aaron Ross (born 1982), American football player
- Aaron Y. Ross (1829–1922), American old west figure
- Adin Ross (born 2000), American Twitch streamer
- Adrian Ross (1859–1933), British lyricist
- Adrian Ross (American football) (born 1975), American football player
- Alan Ross (disambiguation)
- Albert Henderson Wade Ross (1884–1939), American businessman
- Alec Ross (disambiguation)
- Alexander Ross (disambiguation)
- Alex Ross (disambiguation)
- Alf Ross, legal philosopher
- Alice Ross (1930–2020), American culinary historian
- Andrew Ross (disambiguation)
- Andy Ross, American musician
- Annie Ross (1930–2020), British-American singer and actress
- April Ross (born 1982), American beach volleyball player
- Archibald Hilson Ross (1821–1900), New Zealand politician
- Arnold Ross (1906–2002), mathematician
- Atticus Ross (born 1968), English musician

=== B ===
- Barney Ross, American boxer
- Ben Ross (born 1980), Australian rugby league footballer
- Ben Ross (Australian rules footballer) (born 1988)
- Bernard Ross (1924–1999), Welsh footballer
- Betsy Ross (disambiguation)
- Bob Ross (disambiguation)
- Bobby Ross (born 1936), American football player
- Bobby Ross (rugby union), (born 1969)
- Browning Ross, Olympian and father of long-distance running in US

=== C ===
- C. Ben Ross (1876–1946), Governor of Idaho
- Calvin Ross (born 1949), American law enforcement officer
- Cam Ross (born 2001), American football player
- Carl Ross (1901–1986), British businessman
- Caroline Anne Ross, American engineer
- Catherine L. Ross, American educator
- Catherine Sheldrick Ross (1945–2021), Canadian professor and dean
- Charles Ross (disambiguation)
- Charlotte Ross (born 1968), American actress
- Christopher Ross (disambiguation)
- Clara Ross (1858–1954), British composer
- Clarence S. Ross (1880–1975), American mineralogist and geologist
- Clark Ross (born 1957), Canadian Composer
- Cody Ross (born 1980), Major League Baseball outfielder

=== D ===
- D'Angelo Ross (born 1996), American football player
- David Ross (disambiguation)
- D. Bruce Ross (1892–1984), South Australian judge
- Deborah Ross (disambiguation)
- Dennis Ross (born 1948), American diplomat and author
- Dennis A. Ross (born 1959), American politician
- Devonte Ross (born 2002), American football player
- Diana Ross (born 1944), American singer
- Diana Ross (author), English children's book author, illustrator and artist

=== E ===
- Earl Ross (1941–2014), Canadian race car driver
- Edmund G. Ross (1826–1907), Governor of New Mexico Territory
- Edward Ross (disambiguation)
- Eliza Ann Ross (1849–1940), commanded the ship Reform
- Elizabeth Ross (disambiguation)
- Eric Ross (born 1944), Northern Irish footballer
- Ethan Ross, multiple people

=== F ===
- Fiona Ross (journalist), Scottish journalist and broadcaster
- Fiona Ross (nurse) (born 1951), British nurse and academic
- Frank Ross (disambiguation)

=== G ===
- Gabrielle Ross (born 1975), British fashion designer
- Gary Ross (disambiguation)
- Gaylen Ross, American actress and film director
- George Ross (disambiguation)
- Gertrude Ross (1889–1957), American composer
- Glenn Ross, UK strongman/powerlifter
- Glenn Ross (politician), Falkland Island politician
- Gyasi Ross, Blackfeet author, attorney, rapper, speaker and storyteller

=== H ===
- Henry Ross (disambiguation)
- Henryk Ross (1910–1991), Polish Jewish photographer
- Hercules Ross (1745–1816), Scottish merchant who gave evidence against the slave trade
- Horatio Ross (1801–1886), sportsman and pioneer photographer
- Hugh Ross (disambiguation)

=== I ===
- Isaac Ross (planter) (1760–1838), American plantation owner
- Isaac Ross (born 1984), New Zealand rugby player
- Isabel Abraham Ross (1885–1964), British teacher, suffragist, pacifist and biographer
- Ishbel Ross (1895–1975), Scottish-American reporter and nonfiction author

=== J ===
- J. K. L. Ross (1876–1951), Canadian Thoroughbred racer
- Jaan Ross (1957–2026), Estonian musicologist and psychologist
- Jack Ross (disambiguation)
- James Ross (disambiguation)
- Jane Ross (disambiguation)
- Janet Ross (1842–1927), English writer
- Jamie Ross, American actor
- Jeana Ross, American politician from Alabama
- Jeanne W. Ross, (born c. 1952), American organizational theorist
- Jeffrey Ross, stand-up comedian
- Jerry Ross (disambiguation)
- Jim Ross, American professional wrestling commentator
- Joel Ross (disambiguation)
- John Ross (disambiguation)
- Jonathan Ross (disambiguation)
- Josh Ross (disambiguation)
- Juana Ross Edwards (1830–1913), Chilean philanthropist
- Jule Ross (born 2006), German para-athlete
- Justin Ross, (born in 1976), Maryland politician
- Justyn Ross (born 1999), American football player

=== K ===
- Karie Ross (born 1958/9), American sports broadcaster
- Kate Ross (1956–1998), American author
- Katharine Ross (born 1940), American actress
- Katherine Ross (scientist), British marine biologist
- Katherine Ross (died 1697), Scottish Covenanter, memoirist and schoolmistress
- Kathryn Ross (rower) (born 1981), Australian Paralympic rower
- Kathryn Ross (writer) (born 1966), British writer
- Kenneth Ross (disambiguation)
- Kristiina Ross (born 1955), Estonian linguist and translator
- Kyla Ross (born 1996), American gymnast

=== L ===
- Landon Timmonds Ross, Jr., environmental biologist
- LaQuinton Ross (born 1991), American basketball player for Hapoel Eilat of the Israeli Basketball Premier League
- Laura Ross (chess player) (born 1988), American chess player
- Laura Ross (politician), Canadian 21st century politician
- Lawrence Ross (born 1966), American writer
- Lawrence Sullivan Ross (1838–1898), Governor of Texas
- Lee Ross, Canadian-American psychologist
- Lee Ross (actor) (born 1971), English actor
- Letitia Dowdell Ross (1866–1952), American educator; leader of women's organizations
- Lewis Ross (disambiguation)
- Lillian Ross (disambiguation)
- Liz Ross, Australian Marxist, author and gay liberation activist
- Ludwig Ross (1806–1859), German classical archaeologist
- Luke Ross (born 1972), comic artist
- Lyric Ross (born 2003), American actress

=== M ===
- Maggie Napaljarri Ross, Indigenous Australian artist
- Malcolm Ross (disambiguation)
- Marie Claire Ross (born 1975 or 1976), Canadian para-swimmer
- Marion Ross (born 1928), American actress
- Marion Ross (physicist) FRSE (1903–1994), Scottish physicist
- Martin Ross, pen name of Violet Florence Martin and Edith Anna Somerville
- Marty Ross, Scottish writer
- Marty Ross (musician), American musician
- Maurice Ross, Scottish footballer
- Michael Ross (disambiguation)
- Miles Ross (1827–1903), US Congressman from New Jersey

=== N ===
- Nellie Tayloe Ross (1876–1977), Governor of Wyoming
- Nicole Ross (born 1989), American Olympic foil fencer

=== O ===
- Ogden J. Ross (1893–1968), New York politician, World War II U.S. Army general
- Olivia Ross (born 1992), British-French actress

=== P ===
- Paul Ross, journalist and TV-personality
- Percy Ross, philanthropist
- Perley Ason Ross (1883–1939), American experimental physicist

=== R ===
- Ranger Ross (born 1959), American professional wrestler
- Rashad Ross (born 1990), American football player
- Richard Ross (disambiguation)
- Rick Ross (disambiguation)
- "Freeway" Ricky Ross (born 1960), convicted drug dealer
- Ricky Ross (musician) (born 1957), Scottish musician
- Robert Ross (disambiguation)
- Robbie Ross (1869–1918), friend of Oscar Wilde
- Robbie Ross (baseball), (born 1989)
- Robbie Ross (rugby league), Australian rugby league footballer
- Ronald Ross (disambiguation)
- Ronnie Ross (1933–1991), jazz baritone saxophonist
- Russell Ross (1929–1999), American pathologist
- Ryan Ross, guitarist and lyricist for Panic! at the Disco

=== S ===
- Scott Ross (disambiguation)
- Serene Ross (born 1977), American javelin thrower
- Share Ross (born 1963), American bass player of the female hard rock band Vixen
- Shavar Ross, actor
- Shelley Ross, American television executive producer
- Sobieski Ross (1828–1877), US Congressman from Pennsylvania
- Sinclair Ross, (1908–1996), Canadian banker
- Spencer Ross (born 1940), American sportscaster
- Stephen Ross (disambiguation)
- Steve Ross (disambiguation)
- Steven Ross (footballer) (born 1993), Scottish footballer
- Summer Ross (born 1992), American beach volleyball player

=== T ===
- Tadeusz Ross (1938–2021), Polish actor and politician
- Thomas Ross (disambiguation)
- Toby Ross American film director
- Tracee Ellis Ross (born 1972), American actress
- Thaddeus Ross Fictional Character from Marvel Comics

=== V ===
- Victor Ross (1900–1974), American lacrosse player
- Virginia Ross (1857–1923), American author

=== W ===
- W. D. Ross (1877–1971), Scottish philosopher
- Wilbur Ross (born 1937), American investor and government official
- Wilburn K. Ross (1922–2017) United States Army officer
- William Ross (disambiguation)

== People with the given name ==
=== A ===
- Ross Alexander (1907–1937), American stage and film actor
- Ross Allen (Irish cricketer) (born 1996), Irish cricketer
- Ross Allen (herpetologist) (1908–1981), American herpetologist
- Ross Aloisi (born 1973), former Australian footballer
- Ross Andru (1927–1993), American comic book artist and editor

=== B ===
- Ross Bagdasarian, Sr. (1919–1972), creator of Alvin and the Chipmunks
- Ross Bagdasarian, Jr. (born 1949), his son, who continues the Chipmunk media effort
- Ross Bagley (born 1988), American actor and comedian
- Ross Barkley (born 1993), English footballer
- Ross Barnett (1898–1987), U.S. politician
- Ross Barnes (1850–1915), one of the stars of baseball's National Association (1871–1875) and the early National League (1876–1881)
- Ross Bass (1918–1993), American florist, postmaster, Congressman, and United States Senator from Tennessee
- Ross Beever (1946–2010), New Zealand geneticist and mycologist
- Ross Bell (1929–2019), American entomologist
- Ross Benson (1948–2005), Scottish journalist and gossip columnist
- Ross Bentley (born 1956), Canadian racing driver
- Ross Blacklock (born 1998), American football player
- Ross Bleckner (born 1949), American artist
- Ross Boggs (1938–2025), American politician
- Ross Brawn (born 1954), English former motorsport engineer and Formula One team principal
- Ross Browner (1954–2022), American football player
- Ross Butler (actor) (born 1990), American actor

=== C ===
- Ross Cain (1957–2011), Nauruan politician
- Ross Campbell (disambiguation)
- Ross Chastain (born 1992), American racing driver
- Ross Cheever (born 1964), American racing driver, younger brother of Eddie Cheever
- Ross A. Collins (1880–1968), U.S. Representative from Mississippi
- Ross Copperman (born 1982), American singer-songwriter
- Ross Coyle (born 1937), American football player

=== D ===
- Ross Dallow (1937–2020), New Zealand politician
- Ross M. Dick (1912–1994), American journalist
- Ross Dwelley (born 1995), American football player

=== F ===
- Ross Federman (born 1985), drummer for the band Tally Hall
- Ross Filler, known as Remedy (born 1972), American rapper
- Ross Flitney (born 1984), English footballer
- Ross Friedman (born 1992), American Major League Soccer player

=== G ===
- Ross Gardner (born 1985), English footballer
- Ross Gillespie (1935–2023), New Zealand field hockey player and coach
- Ross W. Greene, American psychologist

=== H ===
- Ross Hart (born 1960), Canadian-American professional wrestler and promoter
- Ross Hornby, Canadian lawyer and diplomat
- Ross Hull (born 1975), Canadian actor and meteorologist

=== K ===
- Ross Kemp (born 1964), British actor
- Ross Krautman (born 1991), American football player

=== L ===
- Ross Landry, Canadian politician
- Ross Lynch, (born 1995), American actor, singer and dancer

=== M ===
- Ross Macdonald (1915–1983), Canadian mystery writer
- Ross MacDonald (sailor) (born 1965), Canadian sailor
- Ross Malinger (born 1984), American former child actor
- Ross Martin (1920–1981), American actor
- Ross Martin (American football) (born 1993), American football player
- Ross Martin (skier) (1943–2011), Australian cross-country skier
- Ross Mathews (born 1979), American television personality
- Ross Matiscik (born 1996), American football player
- Ross Miner (born 1991), American skating coach and figure skater
- Ross Muir (born 1995), English snooker player

=== N ===
- Ross Noble (born 1976), English comedian and actor

=== O ===
- Ross O'Donovan (born 1987), animator and co-host of the webseries Steam Train

=== P ===
- Ross Parker (1914–1974), English composer
- Ross Parker, victim of a racially motivated murder in England shortly after the September 11 attacks
- Ross Perot (1930–2019), American businessman and US presidential candidate
- Ross Perry (born 1990), Scottish footballer
- Ross Pierschbacher (born 1995), American football player
- Ross Porter (Canadian broadcaster), Canadian radio executive and music writer
- Ross Porter (sportscaster) (born 1938), American sportscaster
- Ross Prio, Chicago mobster
- Ross Pritchard (1924–2020), American academic administrator

=== R ===
- Ross Rawlings, American pianist, composer, conductor, and music director
- Ross Rebagliati (born 1971), Canadian snowboarder and Olympic gold medalist
- Ross Rowe (born 1977), American rapper, podcaster, producer and entrepreneur

=== S ===
- Ross Sinclair (artist) (born 1966), Scottish visual artist, musician and writer
- Ross Sinclair (water polo) (born 1985), American water polo player and coach
- Ross Strudwick, Australian rugby league footballer and coach
- Ross Sutton (1938–2000), Australian first Paralympic gold medallist

=== T ===
- Ross Taylor (born 1984), New Zealand cricketer
- Ross Taylor (Australian cricketer) (1938–1996), Australian cricketer
- Ross Thomas (born 1981), American actor
- Ross Tucker (born 1979), American football player
- Ross Tremayne (born 1959), American martial artist, bail enforcement agent

=== U ===
- Ross Ulbricht (born 1984), American drug trafficker, founder of the Silk Road

=== W ===
- Ross Wilson (disambiguation)

== Fictional characters ==
=== Given name ===
- Ross Geller, a main character in the TV series Friends
- Ross O'Carroll-Kelly, a literary character created by Irish author Paul Howard
- Ross Poldark, main character of The Poldark Novels, a series of historical novels by Winston Graham

=== Surname ===
- Betty Ross, from Marvel comics, daughter of Thunderbolt Ross
- Danny Ross (Law & Order: Criminal Intent), on the TV series Law & Order: Criminal Intent
- Dr. Doug Ross, on the TV series ER
- Everett K. Ross, a Marvel Comics character, primarily an ally of the superhero Black Panther
- Gretchen Ross, in the feature film Donnie Darko
- Jamie Ross (Law & Order), in the TV series Law & Order
- Mike Ross, in the TV series Suits
- Pete Ross, in the Superman comic books published by DC Comics
- Susan Ross (Seinfeld), in the TV series Seinfeld
- Thunderbolt Ross, a Marvel Comics character, father of Betty Ross who later becomes the Red Hulk

== See also ==
- Justice Ross (disambiguation)
- Ross (disambiguation)
- Clan Ross
- Ríos (disambiguation)
