= Alexander Ross =

Alexander Ross may refer to:

- Alexander Ross (writer) (c. 1590–1654), vicar; Scottish author of Medicus Medicatus
- Alexander Ross (poet) (1699–1784), Scottish author of Helenore, or the Fortunate Shepherdess
- Alexander Walker Ross (1710–1792), Danish military prosecutor
- Alexander Ross (British Army officer) (1742–1827), Surveyor-General of the Ordnance
- Alexander Ross (fur trader) (1783–1856), Canadian fur trader
- Alexander Ross (civil servant) (1800–1889), British civil servant in India
- Alexander McKenzie Ross (1805–1862), British engineer
- Alexander Coffman Ross, author of the 1840 campaign song "Tippecanoe and Tyler Too"
- Alexander Ross (Canadian politician) (1829–1901), Canadian banker and politician
- Alexander Henry Ross (1829–1888), British barrister and Conservative politician
- Alexander Milton Ross (1832–1897), Canadian abolitionist
- Alexander Peter Ross (1833–1915), Canadian politician
- Alexander Ross (architect) (1834–1925), Scottish architect and provost of Inverness
- Alexander Ross (missionary) (1838-1884)
- Alexander Ross (Australian politician) (1843–1912), New South Wales politician
- Alexander Ross (engineer) (1845–1923), Scottish railway engineer
- Alexander Charles Ross (1847–1921), business executive and political figure in Nova Scotia, Canada
- Alexander David Ross (1883–1966), Scots-born physicist and astronomer
- Alexander Ross (cricketer) (1895–1972), Scottish cricketer and civil servant
- Alexander Clark Ross, mayor of Sherbrooke, 1942–1944
- Alex Ross (rower) (Sir Alexander Ross, 1907–1994), New Zealand-born banker and rower
- Alexander Reid Ross, American author and adjunct geography lecturer

== See also ==
- Alec Ross (disambiguation)
- Alex Ross (disambiguation)
- Ross (name)
