= James Ross =

James Ross may refer to:

== Politicians ==
=== Australia ===
- James Ross (Australian lawyer) (1788–1865)
- James Ross (Australian politician) (1895–1975), New South Wales politician

=== Canada ===
- James Ross (MLA) (1814–1874), member of the Legislative Assembly of Quebec
- James Ross (Ontario politician) (1817–1895)
- James Gibb Ross (1819–1888), Canadian merchant and politician from the province of Quebec
- James Ross (Alberta politician) (1851–1936)
- James Alway Ross (1869–1945), politician and poet in Ontario, Canada
- James Walker Ross (1885–1941)
- J. Arthur Ross (1893–1958), Manitoba politician
- James W. Ross (born 1938), Canadian senator

=== United States ===
- James Ross (Pennsylvania politician) (1762–1847), lawyer and senator from Pennsylvania, 1794–1803
- James E. Ross (1921–1993), Pennsylvania state senator
- Jim Ross (politician), former member of the Ohio House of Representatives

== Sportsmen ==
- Jim Ross (Australian footballer) (1927–2015), Australian rules footballer
- Jim Ross (ice hockey) (1926–2016), Scottish-born Canadian ice hockey player
- Jimmy Ross (footballer, born 1866) (1866–1902), Scottish association footballer
- James Ross (rugby union) (1880–1914), Scottish rugby player
- Jimmy Ross (footballer, born 1895) (1895–1962), Scottish professional footballer
- Jim Ross (born 1952), wrestling executive and commentator

== Other people ==
=== Canada ===
- James Ross (Canadian lawyer) (1835–1871), participant in Red River Rebellion
- James Ross (Canadian businessman) (1848–1913), Scottish-born civil engineer and businessman
- James Hamilton Ross (1856–1932), Yukon Territory Commissioner
- James Sinclair Ross (1908–1996), Canadian author

=== United Kingdom ===
- James Ross, 4th Lord Ross (died 1581), Scottish nobleman and an adherent to the cause of Mary, Queen of Scots
- James Ross, 6th Lord Ross (died 1633), Scottish nobleman
- James Ross, 7th Lord Ross (died 1636), Scottish nobleman
- James Ross (conductor), British conductor
- James Ross (surgeon) (1911–1997), Scottish surgeon
- Sir James Clark Ross (1800–1862), British polar explorer
- Sir James Ross, 1st Baronet (1895–1980), British surgeon
- James Ness MacBean Ross (1889–1964), British medical doctor
- James Ross (physician) (1837–1892), Scottish physician

=== United States ===
- James Ross (mayor), mayor of Lancaster, Pennsylvania, 1934–1938
- James Ross (American author) (1911–1990)
- James Delmage Ross (1872–1939), superintendent of lighting for Seattle and member of the Securities and Exchange Commission
- James F. Ross (1931–2010), American philosopher
- Jimmy D. Ross (1936–2012), retired United States Army general
- Jamie Ross (born 1939), American actor
- James William Ross IV (born 1988), American drag queen

=== Other countries ===
- James Henderson Ross (born 1941), Australian botanist
- James Ross (artist) (born 1948), New Zealand painter, exhibited alongside Mervyn Williams
- Jimmy James Ross (1936–2000), Trinidad and Tobago singer

== Other uses ==
- RRS James Clark Ross, a 1990 British Antarctic Survey ship
- Jamie Ross (Law & Order), a character on Law & Order
- Jimmy Ross, a character in The Airmail Mystery
