= Steven J. Ross =

Steven J. Ross may refer to:

- Steve Ross (businessman), American businessman and CEO of Time Warner
- Steven J. Ross (historian), American historian of film and culture

== See also ==
- Steve Ross (disambiguation)
