= Stephen Ross =

Stephen Ross may refer to:

- Stephen Ross, Baron Ross of Newport (1926–1993), British politician; former Liberal member of parliament
- Stephen Ross (economist) (1944–2017), American economist and author
- Stephen David Ross (born 1935), American philosopher
- Stephen L. Ross (c. 1815–1891), American farmer and legislator
- Stephen M. Ross (born 1940), American real estate developer and owner of the Miami Dolphins
- Stephen M. Ross (politician) (born 1951), American politician in North Carolina

== See also ==
- Steve Ross (disambiguation)
- Stephan Ross (1931–2020), Polish-American holocaust survivor
