= David McSweeney =

David McSweeney may refer to:

- Dave McSweeney (born 1981), English footballer
- David McSweeney (politician) (born 1965), Illinois politician

== See also ==
- Dave MacSweeney (1930—2010), Irish international rugby union player
