= Senator Ross =

Senator Ross may refer to:

== Members of the Liberian Senate ==
- Joseph J. Ross (1842–1899), Liberian Senator from Sinoe County

== Members of the United States Senate ==
- James Ross (Pennsylvania politician) (1762–1847), U.S. Senator from Pennsylvania from 1794 to 1803
- Jonathan Ross (senator) (1826–1905), U.S. Senator from Vermont from 1899 to 1900

== United States state senate members ==
- Charlie Ross (Mississippi politician) (born 1956), Mississippi State Senate
- Edmund G. Ross (1826–1907), Kansas and New Mexico Territory
- James E. Ross (1921–1993), Pennsylvania State Senate
- John Wilson Ross (1863–1945), Arizona State Senate
- Lawrence Sullivan Ross (1838–1898), Texas State Senate
- Mike Ross (politician) (born 1961), Arkansas State Senate
- Ogden J. Ross (1893–1968), New York State Senate
- Quinton Ross (politician) (born 1968), Alabama State Senate
- Richard J. Ross (fl. 1970s–2010s), Massachusetts State Senate
- Stephen L. Ross (1810s–1891), Tennessee State Senate
- Tony Ross (politician) (born 1953), Wyoming State Senate
- William Ross (New York politician) (died 1830), New York State Senate

== Other ==
- Pete Ross, a fictional character appearing in American comic books published by DC Comics
