= Alan Ross (disambiguation) =

Alan Ross (1922–2001) was a British poet and editor.

Alan Ross may also refer to:

- Alan S. C. Ross (1907–1980), British linguist
- Alan Ross (footballer, born 1933), English footballer
- Allan Ross (1942–1999), Scottish football goalkeeper (Carlisle United)
- Alan Ross, American singer-songwriter with Children of Rain
- Allan Ross (gangster) (1944–2018), Canadian gangster
