= Edward Ross =

Edward Ross may refer to:

- Edward Ross (cricketer) (1860-1937), New Zealand cricketer
- Edward Alsworth Ross (1866–1951), American sociologist, eugenicist, and a major figure of early criminology
- Edward Burns Ross (1881–1947), Scottish mathematician
- Edward Denison Ross (1871–1940), English Orientalist and linguist
- Edward Ross (rugby union), Scottish rugby union player
- Edward Shearman Ross (1915–2016), American entomologist
- Edward T. Ross (1886–1957), American sanitary engineer and inspector
- Edward T. Ross (engineer), pioneer automobile engineer for Cadillac and Crown
- Gabrielle Ross, Lady Edward Manners (born 1975), British fashion designer

== See also ==
- Ed Ross (1965–2016), American tintype photographer and lawyer
