= George Ross =

George Ross may refer to:

== Politics ==
- George Ross (American politician) (1730–1779), signatory to the U.S. Declaration of Independence
- George Ross (Pennsylvania statesman) (1746–1801), Lt. Governor of Pennsylvania, 1788–1790
- George Ross (farmer) (1829–1876), New Zealand farmer and provincial politician
- George Ross (Pennsylvania candidate), candidate for U.S. House of Representatives in 1884 and 1888 and U.S. Senate in 1893
- George William Ross (1841–1914), Canadian educator and politician
- George A. Ross (1854–1888), lawyer and political figure in Nova Scotia, Canada
- George Henry Ross (1878–1956), politician and barrister from Alberta, Canada
- George T. Ross (1949–2020), member of the Massachusetts House of Representatives

== Sports ==
- George Ross (footballer, born 1869) (1869–1928), footballer who played for Bury in two FA Cup finals
- George Ross (gymnast) (1877–1945), British gymnast and Olympic medalist
- George Ross (baseball) (1892–1935), Major League Baseball pitcher
- George Ross (Australian footballer) (1901–1989), played with Richmond in the VFL
- George Ross (rugby union) (1925—2015) Irish international rugby union player.
- George Ross (footballer, born 1943) (1943–2016), Scottish footballer, notably with Preston

== Other ==
- George Ross, 11th Lord Ross (died 1682), Scottish nobleman and soldier
- George Ross, 13th Lord Ross (1681–1754), Scottish nobleman
- George Murray Ross (1852–1927), Irish engineer
- George Allen Ross (1879–1946), Canadian architect
- George Campbell Ross (1900–1993), engineer and Royal Navy admiral
- George Ronald Ross (1914–2008), British businessman in Hong Kong
- George Berkeley Ross (1918–2006), pioneer of information technology in the American petroleum industry
- George H. Ross (born 1928), American businessman, officer of the Trump Organization
