= Steve Ross =

Steve Ross may refer to:

- Steve Ross (director) (born 1949), American film director
- Steve Ross (businessman) (1927–1992), American businessman and CEO of Time Warner, and member of the National Soccer Hall of Fame
- Steve Ross (basketball) (born 1980), Canadian basketball player
- Steven Ross (footballer) (born 1993), Scottish footballer
- Stevie Ross (born 1965), Scottish footballer
- Steve Ross (cabaret singer) (born 1938), American cabaret singer and pianist
- Steven J. Ross (historian), American historian and author
- Steven T. Ross (1937–2018), American military historian
- Stephan Ross (1931–2020), Polish-American Holocaust survivor
- Stephen M. Ross (born 1940), American businessman and owner of the Miami Dolphins
- Stephen M. Ross (politician) (born 1951), American politician
- Steve Ross, artist son of Bob Ross

== See also ==
- Stephen Ross (disambiguation)
