= Timothy Denevi =

American nonfiction writer

Timothy Jack Denevi (born 1979) is an American author, essayist, and professor known for his nonfiction works examining American politics, mental health, and cultural history.

== Early life and education ==
Denevi grew up in Los Gatos, California. He attended Bellarmine College Preparatory, a private Jesuit all-male school in the College Park neighborhood of San Jose. Diagnosed with ADHD at an early age, Denevi experienced an adverse reaction to Ritalin at age six, an experience that would later inform his memoir Hyper.

He received his Bachelor of Arts in English from Northwestern University, his Master of Arts in English from the University of Hawaii at Manoa, and his Master of Fine Arts in nonfiction from the University of Iowa in 2010.

== Career ==
=== Academic career ===
Denevi is an associate professor in the Master of Fine Arts program at George Mason University, where he teaches creative writing and nonfiction. He previously served as a visiting writer in the program before receiving tenure.

=== Books ===
==== Hyper: A Personal History of ADHD (2014) ====
Denevi's debut book, published by Simon & Schuster, combines memoir with cultural and medical history of Attention Deficit Hyperactivity Disorder. As one of the first generation of children prescribed ADHD medication in the 1980s, Denevi experienced an adverse reaction to Ritalin at age six, beginning a journey through various treatments that he chronicles alongside the broader history of ADHD diagnosis and treatment from the 19th century to the present.

In preparation for writing Hyper, Denevi studied the nonfiction works of Tobias Wolff, Michael J. Arlen, and W. G. Sebald for inspiration. He also drew influence from the short stories of Stephanie Vaughn (particularly Able, Baker, Charlie, Dog and Dog Heaven), Italo Calvino's Cosmicomics, and the works of Denis Johnson.

Kirkus Reviews called the book "an evocative and insightful memoir of thriving with ADHD," while Nature described it as "a haunting narrative that explores the world's most scrutinized childhood condition from the inside out." BookPage praised the work as "riveting and monumental," noting that "there's much to be learned in this book about ADHD, about pushing boundaries and respecting them, about parenting, and about the special kind of triumph that can come as a result of hard-earned self-knowledge." ADDitude Magazine praised the work for providing "enlightening insights" and offering "revelations to readers unfamiliar with the condition."

==== Freak Kingdom: Hunter S. Thompson's Manic Ten-Year Crusade Against American Fascism (2018) ====
Published by PublicAffairs/Hachette, this biography examines Hunter S. Thompson's political journalism from 1963 to 1974, focusing on his opposition to American authoritarianism and fascism during the Vietnam War and Nixon era.

Rolling Stone wrote: "Freak Kingdom...sheds new light on Thompson's political awakening and reporting and the toll it took on him and his later work and life. Few books this season will give you a stronger and more chilling sense of déjà vu."

The Associated Press stated: "Denevi...crafts his biography like a nonfiction novel, letting his research unfold in a captivating narrative that places readers at some of the most important episodes of Thompson's career. Denevi's work reminds us that the persistent concern about totalitarianism overwhelming free speech isn't something new."

Publishers Weekly described it as "a sympathetic biography" that "will deepen readers' understanding of the personal events and experiences that surrounded and informed Thompson's best-known works."

Additional reviews and coverage appeared in The Atlantic, which noted that "what Thompson chronicled in his inimitable way during the Nixon era America acting on its worst impulses still resonates today."

Salon praised the work, writing: "Through meticulous research and recreated in novelistic detail, Denevi chronicles Thompson's scramble to create a viable career out of the instability of freelance writing...If you've ever felt Thompson a bit much to read on his own, Freak Kingdom makes a handy and stabilizing companion text."

=== Essays and journalism ===
Denevi's essays on politics, sports, religion, and culture have appeared in publications including: The New York Times, The Atlantic, The Paris Review, New York Magazine, Salon, CNN, Time Magazine, Literary Hub, The Normal School, and Scoundrel Time.

Notable pieces include "Joan Didion, the Death of R.F.K. and the Solution to a Decades-Old Mystery" (The New York Times, 2023), a series on right-wing media figures for Salon (2023), and extensive coverage of the 2016 U.S. presidential election and political conventions for Literary Hub.

=== Media appearances ===
Denevi has appeared on major podcasts and television programs, including:

- The Joe Rogan Experience (#1264, 2019), discussing Hunter S. Thompson and journalism
- The Daily Stoic podcast, on journalism and the art of writing
- C-SPAN's Book TV, discussing both Freak Kingdom and Hyper

== Awards and recognition ==
Denevi has received fellowships from:

- The MacDowell Colony (2015)
- The Virginia Center for the Creative Arts

He has served as a judge for the Oregon Book Awards, participating in the selection process for the Frances Fuller Victor Award for General Nonfiction in 2024.

== Personal life ==
Denevi lives in Washington, D.C., with his family. He has cited W.G. Sebald's The Rings of Saturn as his favorite book, reflecting his literary sensibilities and the influence of Sebald's style on his work.

== Bibliography ==
=== Books ===
- Hyper: A Personal History of ADHD (Simon & Schuster, 2014)
- Freak Kingdom: Hunter S. Thompson's Manic Ten-Year Crusade Against American Fascism (PublicAffairs, 2018)

=== Selected essays ===
- "Joan Didion, the Death of R.F.K. and the Solution to a Decades-Old Mystery," The New York Times, 2023
- "Right-Wing Story Time" series (Parts 1-3), Salon, 2023
- "On American Fascism and the Self-Destruct Button at the Heart of Our Democracy," CNN.com, 2018
- "Richard Nixon, Barry Goldwater, and Hunter S. Thompson at the 1964 RNC," The Paris Review, 2017
- "On Impulsiveness, Authenticity, and Donald Trump," New York Magazine, 2017
