= Andrew Ross =

Andrew Ross or Andy Ross may refer to:

== Sport ==
- Andrew Ross (footballer, born 1878) (1878–?), Scottish footballer
- Andrew Ross (footballer, born 1988), Scotland-born Virgin Islander footballer
- Andrew Ross (rugby union, born 1879) (1879–1916), Scottish rugby player, played for Royal High School FP and Scotland
- Andrew Ross (rugby union, born 1904) (1904–?), Scottish rugby player, played for Kilmarnock RFC, Scotland and the British Lions
- Andrew Ross (rugby union, born 1892) (1892–1981), Scottish rugby union player, played for Edinburgh University and Scotland
- Andy Ross (speedway rider) (1940–2006), Scottish speedway rider

== The arts ==
- Andrew Ross (artist) (born 1989), American sculptor
- Andrew Ross (theatre director), former artistic director of Black Swan Theatre Company, Western Australia
- Andy Ross (born 1979), American musician
- Andy Ross (music executive) (1956–2022), British music executive

== Others ==
- Andrew Ross (Australian politician) (1829–1910), New South Wales politician
- Andrew Ross (businessman) (1857–1941), Canadian businessman
- Andrew Ross (medical doctor) (born c. 1960), South African doctor specialising in family medicine
- Andrew Ross (minister) (1931–2008), Scottish minister, missionary and academic
- Andrew Ross (sociologist) (born 1956), professor of social and cultural analysis at New York University
