= Jeff Sparrow =

Australian writer (born 1969)

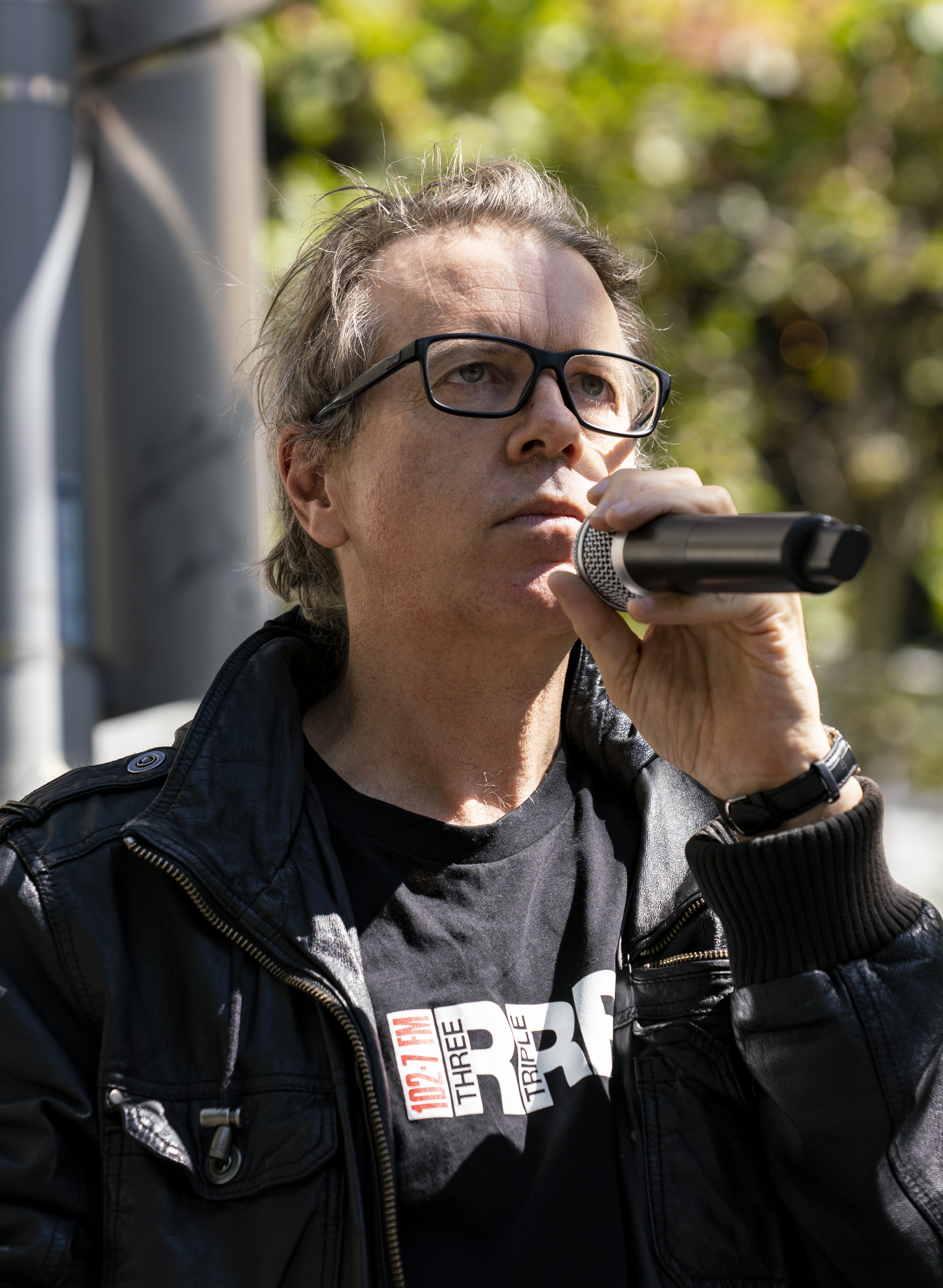
- Sparrow in 2022
- Born: 1969 (age 56–57)
- Education: RMIT University (PhD)
- Occupations: Writer, journalist
- Notable work: Trigger Warnings: Political Correctness and the Rise of the Right
- Political party: Victorian Socialists

Jeff Sparrow (born 1969) is an Australian left-wing writer, editor and socialist activist based in Melbourne, Victoria. He is the co-author of Radical Melbourne: A Secret History and Radical Melbourne 2: The Enemy Within (both with sister, Jill Sparrow). He is also the author of Communism: A Love Story and Killing: Misadventures in Violence.

He was the winner of the 2019 Pascall Prize for Arts Criticism.

== Political activism ==
As a student activist and member of the Trotskyist group, the International Socialist Organisation (ISO), Sparrow was one of the Austudy Five, controversially arrested after a protest in 1992. He was expelled from the ISO in 1995. After leaving Socialist Alternative, he was involved for some years in the group Civil Rights Defence. In 2018, he endorsed Stephen Jolly and the Victorian Socialists.

== Publications ==
Radical Melbourne (Vulgar Press, 2001) presents a guide through the first 100 years of political radicalism in Melbourne, focusing on the structures, streets and public places that remain today, and illustrated by rarely seen images from the archives of the State Library of Victoria. Journalist and author John Pilger called Radical Melbourne "a brilliantly original, long overdue unveiling of a great city's true past". The book inspired Radical Brisbane, a similar project about the Queensland capital, by Raymond Evans and Carole Ferrier.

The sequel, Radical Melbourne 2: The Enemy Within (Vulgar Press, 2004), was described by reviewer Ian Morrison as "sparkl[ing] with furious wit ... the Sparrows are devastatingly funny."

Communism: A Love Story (Melbourne University Press, 2007) is a biography of the radical intellectual Guido Baracchi, a founder of the Communist Party of Australia. The book traces Baracchi's political career from his support for the Industrial Workers of the World to his association with the Trotskyist Fourth International; it also examines his turbulent personal life and his relationships with writers such as Katharine Susannah Prichard, Lesbia Harford and Betty Roland. It was shortlisted for the Colin Roderick Award.

Killing: Misadventures in Violence (Melbourne University Press, 2009) is a study of the social and psychological consequences of executions, combat and animal slaughter. It was a finalist in the Melbourne Prize for Literature Best Writing Award 2009.

Left Turn: Political Essays for the New Left (Melbourne University Press, 2012) was co-edited by Sparrow and Antony Loewenstein.

Money Shot: A Journey into Porn and Censorship (Scribe, 2012) "probes the contradictions of our relationship to sex and censure, excess and folly, erotica and vice."

No Way But This: In Search of Paul Robeson (Scribe, 2017).

Trigger Warnings: Political Correctness and the Rise of the Right (Scribe, 2018) "draws lessons from contemporary debates and historical struggles to argue for an alternative to the seemingly oppositional binary of class or identity that dominates liberal discourse".

Fascists Among Us: Online Hate and the Christchurch Massacre (Scribe, 2019) demonstrates "the importance of confronting the truth rather than retreating from its horrors".

Crimes Against Nature: Capitalism and Global Heating (Scribe, 2021) proposes a counter-argument to ‘we are all to blame for global warming,’ providing a solution drawn from environmental history and peoples’ actions. It was shortlisted for the 2023 Douglas Stewart Prize for Non-Fiction at the New South Wales Premier's Literary Awards.

In 2026 he was shortlisted for the Hazel Rowley Literary Fellowship for a proposed biography of Australian poet and activist Lesbia Harford.

== Later work ==
After completing a PhD in Creative Media at RMIT University in 2006, Sparrow became a Research Fellow at Victoria University and the editor of the literary journal Overland. His work has appeared in The Age, The Sydney Morning Herald, Overland, Arena, Meanjin and other print publications; he contributes regularly to Crikey, ABC The Drum Unleashed, The Guardian Australia and other online outlets. In late 2009, he began co-hosting the Aural Text show on Melbourne radio station 3RRR with Alicia Sometimes.
