= Tomas Ross =

Tomas Ross may refer to:

- Tomas Ross (writer)
- Tomas Ross (actor)
- Tomas Ross (trial lawyer)

== See also ==
- Thomas Ross (disambiguation)
