= Secretary Ross =

Secretary Ross may refer to:

- Wilbur Ross (born 1937), United States Secretary of Commerce (2017–present)
- Willie Ross, Baron Ross of Marnock (1911–1988), Secretary of State for Scotland (1964–1970, 1974–1976)

== See also ==
- Ross (name)
