= Judge Ross =

Judge Ross may refer to:

- Allyne R. Ross (born 1946), judge of the United States District Court for the Eastern District of New York
- Donald Roe Ross (1922–2013), judge of the United States Court of Appeals for the Eighth Circuit
- Eleanor L. Ross (born 1967), judge of the United States District Court for the Northern District of Georgia
- Erskine Mayo Ross (1845–1928), judge of the United States Court of Appeals for the Ninth Circuit
- John Andrew Ross (born 1954), judge of the United States District Court for the Eastern District of Missouri
- John Rolly Ross (1899–1963), judge of the United States District Court for the District of Nevada
- John William Ross (1878–1925), judge of the United States District Court for the Western District of Tennessee

== See also ==
- Justice Ross (disambiguation)
