= George Ross (rugby union) =

Rugby union player from Northern Ireland

- Full name: George Robert Porter Ross
- Born: 1 November 1925 Portadown, Northern Ireland
- Died: 17 March 2015 (aged 89) Belfast, Northern Ireland

Rugby union career
- Position: Back-row
International career
Years	Team	Apps	(Points)
1955	Ireland	1	(0)

George Robert Porter Ross (1 November 1925 — 17 March 2015) was an Irish international rugby union player.

Ross was born in Portadown and served as a Commando during World War II.

A CIYMS player, Ross gained his solitary Ireland cap during the 1955 Five Nations, as one of five changes for the match against Wales at Cardiff Arms Park, replacing Dave MacSweeney in the back-row.

Ross was later headmaster of Movilla Secondary School in Newtownards.

== See also ==
- List of Ireland national rugby union players
