= David Ross =

David or Dave Ross may refer to:

== Arts and entertainment ==
- David Ross (actor, born 1728) (1728–1790), British actor
- David Ross (actor) (born 1945), English actor
- Dave Ross (born 1952), American radio talk show host and actor
- David R. Ross (1958–2010), Scottish travel writer and historian
- David W. Ross (born 1974), English actor and writer
- David Ross (director), American filmmaker; director of The Babysitters
- David Ross, character in Beyond the Sea (Black Mirror)

== Law and politics ==
- David Ross, Lord Ankerville (1727–1805) Scottish judge
- David Ross (Continental Congress) (1755–1800), American lawyer, Continental Congress representative from Maryland
- David Robert Ross (1797–1851), Irish politician, MP for Belfast and Governor of Tobago
- David Alexander Ross (1819–1897), Canadian lawyer, businessman and political figure in Quebec
- David Ross (lawyer), American environmental and land-use lawyer
- Dave Ross (politician), American politician in Wisconsin
- David Munroe Ross, Canadian politician

== Sports ==
- Davie Ross (1884-1947), English footballer
- Dave Ross (rugby league) (1917–1998), Australian rugby league player
- Dave Ross (American football) (born 1938), American football player
- David Ross (sport shooter) (born 1940), American sports shooter
- David Ross (trampolinist) (born 1950), Canadian trampoline coach and equipment manufacturer
- Davie Ross (Scottish footballer) (born 1951), Scottish footballer
- David Ross (American football) (born 1959), American college football coach
- Dave Ross (rower) (born 1963), Canadian rower
- David Ross (baseball) (born 1977), American former baseball manager and player

== Others ==
- David Ross (naval officer) (fl. 1790s), American officer in the Continental Navy
- David Ross (minister) (1857–1931) Scottish minister, founder of Scotch College, Perth
- David Edward Ross (1871–1943), American inventor and philanthropist
- Sir W. D. Ross (William David Ross, 1877–1971), Scottish moral philosopher
- David Ross (aviator) (1902–1984), Australian intelligence officer and consul
- David Ross (businessman) (born 1965), English businessman, co-founder of Carphone Warehouse
- David Ross (architect) (1828 – 1908), Scottish-born New Zealand architect
