= ADDitude =

American health magazine

- Categories: Health
- Frequency: Quarterly
- Founded: 1998
- Company: WebMD
- Country: United States
- Language: English
- Website: www.additudemag.com

ADDitude magazine is a quarterly consumer publication about attention deficit hyperactivity disorder (ADHD or ADD) owned and operated by WebMD, LLC in New York, NY. It contains feature and service articles about ADD, ADHD and comorbid conditions including depression, anxiety, and learning disabilities like dyslexia. It addresses topics including: diagnosing ADHD in children and adults, attention-deficit hyperactivity disorder management and treatments including medication and/or alternative therapies, parenting children with ADHD, learning disabilities and school challenges, and living with adult ADHD. ADDitude magazine is described by child psychotherapist Keath Low as "The happy, healthy lifestyle magazine for people with ADD." It aims to be an advocate for children and adults with ADHD.

The official website for ADDitude magazine was launched in April 2007, and contains searchable archives, expert Q&As, ADHD bloggers and a directory of ADHD service providers.

== History ==
ADDitude was founded by Ellen Kingsley (an Emmy-winning television journalist) in 1998 to serve the parents of America's 2-3 million schoolchildren with ADD and ADHD, as well as adults, with the disorder. Kingsley founded ADDitude as a web site a few years after her oldest son, Teddy, was diagnosed with severe ADHD. ADDitude became a print magazine two years later.

Kingsley died from breast cancer on March 8, 2007. In her honor, ADDitude magazine started the Ellen Kingsley Award for ADHD Advocacy the same year.

== Staff ==
The ADDitude editorial and design staff includes:

- General manager: Anni Layne Rodgers
- Editor in chief: Carole Fleck
- Managing editor: Eve Gilman
- Editor: Nathaly Pesantez
- Senior editor: Melanie Wachsman
- Editorial Project Management Specialist: Carly Broadway
- Social media editors: Rebecca Brown Wright
- Copy editor: Gene Jones
- Advertising: Tracy Kennedy

== Scientific advisory board ==
Members of the magazine's scientific advisory board review all scientific or medical information contained in ADDitude prior to publication:

- Thomas E. Brown, Ph.D. (Yale University School of Medicine)
- Russell Barkley, Ph.D. (Medical University of South Carolina)
- William Dodson, M.D. (Dodson ADHD Center)
- Ross W. Greene, Ph.D. (Lives in Balance)
- Edward M. Hallowell, M.D. (The Hallowell Center)
- Peter Jaksa, Ph.D. (ADD Centers of America)
- Peter Jensen, M.D. (Center for the Advancement of Children's Mental Health, Columbia University College of Physicians and Surgeons)
- Sandy Newmark, M.D. (Osher Center for Integrative Medicine)
- Michele Novotni, Ph.D. (Wayne Counseling Center)
- Roberto Olivardia, Ph.D. (Harvard Medical School)
- J. Russell Ramsay, Ph.D. (Perelman School of Medicine)
- Jerome Schultz, Ph.D. (Harvard Medical School)
- Timothy Wilens, M.D. (Harvard Medical School)
