= Hecate (journal) =

- Language: English

Publication details
- History: 1975–present
- Publisher: Hecate Press, in association with the Centre for Women, Gender, Culture and Social Change Research (Australia)

Standard abbreviations
- ISO 4: Hecate

Indexing
- ISSN: 0311-4198
- OCLC no.: 60621492

Links
- Journal homepage

Hecate: An Interdisciplinary Journal of Women's Liberation is an Australian feminist academic journal, founded in 1975.

It is currently published by Hecate Press, in association with the Centre for Women, Gender, Culture and Social Change Research, in the School of English, Media Studies and Art History at the University of Queensland. Its current and foundation editor is Carole Ferrier. In 1997 Hecate Press amalgamated the Australian Women's Book Review to become the Hecate's Australian Women's Book Review.
