= Elizabeth Ross =

Elizabeth Ross may refer to:

- Betty Ross (active since 1962), fictional character in Marvel Comics
- Liz Ross (active since 1972), Australian socialist activist and author
- Elizabeth Ness MacBean Ross (1878–1915), Scots-born physician to the Bakhtiari people
- Beth Ross (born 1996), New Zealand world champion rower
- Elizabeth Ross (poet) (1789–1875), Scottish poet, artist, and collector of Gaelic music

== See also ==
- Betsy Ross (disambiguation)
