= Robert Ross =

Robert Ross may refer to:

== Academia ==
- Robert Ross (entrepreneur) (1918–2011), founder of Ross University
- Robert J. S. Ross (born 1943), American professor of sociology and activist
- Robert S. Ross (born 1954), American professor of political science at Boston College

== Military ==
- Robert Ross (British Army officer) (1766–1814), Anglo-Irish British Army officer
- Robert Ross (British Marines officer) (died 1794), commander in the first European settlement of New South Wales
- Robert Knox Ross (1893–1951), British Army officer

== Nobility ==
- Robert Ross, 5th Lord Ross (1563–1595), Scottish nobleman
- Robert Ross, 9th Lord Ross (died 1648), Scottish nobleman

== Politics ==
- Robert Dalrymple Ross (1827–1887), South Australian politician
- Robert Beatson Ross (1867–1949), New Zealand politician
- Robert Tripp Ross (1903–1981), United States representative from New York
- Robert Max Ross (1933–2009), Republican activist and candidate in Louisiana
- Robert Ross (Missouri politician) (born 1981), member of the Missouri House of Representatives
- Robert L. Ross (1863—1933), Texas legislator and lawyer

== Sports ==
- Ranger Ross (Robert Lee Ross, Jr.; born 1959), American professional wrestler
- Robbie Ross (rugby league) (born 1975), Australian rugby league footballer
- Robbie Ross Jr. (born 1989), American baseball pitcher

== Other ==
- Robert Ross (preacher), Presbyterian preacher
- Robbie Ross (1869–1918), Canadian journalist, art critic, literary executor of Oscar Wilde
- Robert Samuel Ross (1873–1931), Australian socialist journalist, trade unionist, and agitator
- Robert Ernest Ross (1871–1960), English barrister, court official, and legal writer
- Robert Ross (botanist) (1912–2005), British botanist
- Robert Ross (CEO) (1920–2006), founder and leader of the Muscular Dystrophy Association
- Robert Ross (courtier) (born 1950), Scottish surveyor and courtier
- Black Rob (Robert Ross; 1968–2021), American rapper
- Robert J. Ross (born 1974), foundation president
- Robert Ross (blues singer), American blues vocalist, guitarist

== See also ==
- Bob Ross (disambiguation)
- Bobby Ross (disambiguation)
- Ross (name)
