= Betsy Ross (disambiguation) =

Betsy Ross (1752–1836) was an American woman who is said to have sewn the first American flag.

Betsy Ross may also refer to:

- Betsy McCaughey Ross (born 1948), lieutenant-governor of the State of New York
- Betsy King Ross (1921–1989), American actress, anthropologist and author
- Khadijah Farrakhan (born Betsy Ross, 1935–2026), wife of Louis Farrakhan
- Betsy Ross (solitaire), a solitaire card game
- TS Betsy Ross, a cruise ship, originally built as TS Leda
- Golden Girl (Timely Comics), a Golden Age comic character, whose secret identity was Betsy Ross
- A train operated by Amtrak as part of the Clocker service
- Betsy Ross (film), a 1917 American silent historical film
- Betsy Ross Bridge, a bridge connecting Pennsauken, New Jersey to Philadelphia, Pennsylvania over the Delaware River
- Betsy Ross, a journalist in Cincinnati
- Betsy Ross Spinets, a line of Lester pianos

== See also ==
- Betsy Ross House, one of the most visited tourist sites in Philadelphia where Betsy Ross is alleged to have lived
- Betsy Ross flag
- Elizabeth Ross (disambiguation)
