= Vulgar Press =

Australian independent publisher

Vulgar Press is a publishing house based in Melbourne, Australia. Established in 1999, the publisher's stated aim is "the publication of working-class and other radical forms of writing". Vulgar Press publishes a number of books and magazines for alternative and non-profit companies and organisations. Their authors include Dorothy Hewett, Jeff Sparrow, Jill Sparrow, Liz Ross, Carole Ferrier and A. L. McCann.
