= Chris Ross =

Chris or Christopher Ross may refer to:

- Christopher Ross (sculptor) (1931–2023), American sculptor, designer and collector
- Chris Ross (snooker player) (1932–2013), English snooker player
- Christopher W. S. Ross (born 1943), American diplomat
- L. Chris Ross (born 1951), Pennsylvania politician
- Christopher Ross (writer) (born 1960), non-fiction writer and martial artist
- Christopher Ross (cinematographer) (born 1976), British cinematographer
- Chris Ross (rugby union) (born 1979), Australian rugby union player
- Chris Ross (musician) (fl. 2000–present), Australian musician
- Chris Ross (basketball) (born 1985), Filipino-American basketball player
