= Bobby Ross (disambiguation) =

Bobby Ross (born 1936) is an American former football coach.

Bobby Ross may also refer to:

- Bobby Ross (footballer, born 1917) (1917–1994), Scottish footballer
- Bobby Ross (footballer, born 1925) (1925–1984), Scottish footballer for Dundee United F.C.
- Bobby Ross (footballer, born 1941) (1941–2022), Scottish football midfielder
- Bobby Ross (footballer, born 1942) (1942–2026), Scottish football midfielder
- Bobby Ross (rugby union) (born 1969), former Canadian national rugby player

== See also ==
- Bob Ross (disambiguation)
- Robert Ross (disambiguation)
