= Bob Ross (disambiguation) =

Bob Ross (1942–1995) was an American painter and television presenter.

Bob Ross may also refer to:

- Bob Ross (publisher) (1934–2003), American publisher/activist
- Bob Ross (baseball) (born 1928), American pitcher
- Bob Ross (racing driver) (1914–1974), American racing driver
- Bob Ross (Australian footballer) (1908–1988), Australian rules footballer
- Bob Ross (footballer, born 1901), Scottish footballer

== See also ==
- Robert Ross (disambiguation)
- Bobby Ross (disambiguation)
- Bob Roth, Transcendental Meditation teacher and author
