= Edward Ross (rugby union) =

Scotland international rugby union player

Edward Ross was a Scottish rugby union player.

He was capped once for Scotland in 1904. He also played for London Scottish FC.

He was the brother of James Ross who was also capped for Scotland.
