= Thomas Ross =

Thomas, Tom or Tommy Ross may refer to:

== Arts, entertainment, and media ==
- Thomas Ross (architect) (1839–1930), Scottish architect, best known for surveys of Scotland's architectural heritage
- Thomas W. Ross (1875–1959), American stage and film actor
- T. Paterson Ross (Thomas Paterson Ross, died 1957), architect in the San Francisco Bay Area
- Tom Ross (producer) (born 1947), Scottish journalist and television producer
- Tom Ross, radio sport broadcaster on Gold and BRMB

== Politicians ==
- Thomas Edwin Ross (1873–1951), member of the Canadian House of Commons
- Thomas Hambly Ross (1886–1956), Canadian politician
- Thomas R. Ross (1788–1869), U.S. Representative from Ohio
- Thomas Ross (minister) (1614–1679), Scottish minister
- Thomas Ross (Pennsylvania politician) (1806–1865), U.S. Representative from Pennsylvania
- Tom Ross (politician) (born 1981), British Labour politician

== Sports ==
- Tom Ross (cricketer) (1872–1947), Irish cricketer
- Tom Ross (ice hockey defenseman), ice hockey defenseman
- Tom Ross (ice hockey, born 1954) (born 1954), former professional ice hockey player
- Tom Ross (rugby union) (born 1998), Australian rugby union player
- Tommy Ross (footballer) (1946–2017), Scottish professional footballer
- Tommy Ross (speed skater) (1927–2021), British Olympic speed skater

== Others ==
- Thomas Ross (courtier) (1620–1675), English courtier, poet, and translator
- Thomas E. Ross (born 1942), professor at the University of North Carolina at Pembroke
- Thomas Warren Ross (born 1950), president of the University of North Carolina system
- Tommy Ross, fictional character from the horror novel Carrie by Stephen King
