= Michael Ross =

Michael or Mike Ross may refer to:

== Politics ==
- Mike Ross (politician) (born 1961), former United States Representative from Arkansas's 4th congressional district
- Michael Ross (Washington politician) (1941–2007), member of the Washington House of Representatives
- Michael P. Ross (born 1972), city council member, Boston, Massachusetts, 2000–2014
- Mike Ross (born 1982), American financial planner and politician, libertarian candidate for Governor of North Carolina in 2024

== Sports ==
- Mike Ross (rugby union) (born 1979), Leinster rugby union player
- Michael Ross (cricketer) (born 1998), Italian cricketer
- Michael Ross (footballer) (born 1991), Australian rules footballer for Essendon in the Australian Football League
- Michael Ross (rugby league), Australian rugby league player

== Other ==
- Mike Ross (artist), American sculptor
- Michael Ross (artist) (born 1954), American artist
- Michael Ross (screenwriter) (1919–2009), American screenwriter
- Michael Bruce Ross (1959–2005), American convicted serial killer
- Mike Ross (announcer) (born 1973), Canadian radio host and Toronto Maple Leafs arena announcer
- I. Michael Ross, American innovator and founder of pseudospectral optimal control theory
- Michael Ross, American record producer and partner in hip-hop label Delicious Vinyl
- Michael Ross, keyboardist and producer with Australian musical duo Electric Fields

== In media ==
- Michael Ross (Home and Away), fictional character from the television series Home and Away
- Mike Ross (character), a fictional character from the television series Suits
