= Deborah Ross =

Deborah Ross may refer to:

- Deborah J. Ross (born 1947), American writer
- Deborah Ross (politician) (born 1963), American politician from North Carolina
- Deborah Ross (journalist), British journalist
