= Steve Ross (director) =

American film director

Steve Ross (born Steven J. Ross in Elmont, New York on December 29, 1949) is an American motion picture director living in Memphis, Tennessee. He is best known for his documentary Oh Freedom After While, a story of the Missouri sharecropper strike of 1939. Ross received a bachelor's degree from the State University of New York in 1971 and a master's degree from New York University in 1974. He is a professor at the University of Memphis and was named Communicator of the Year by the Tennessee Speech Communication Association in 1999.

== Directorial filmography ==
- Oh Freedom After While (1999)
- Black Diamonds, Blues City: Stories of the Memphis Red Sox (narrated by Samuel L. Jackson)
- At The River I Stand (1993): Documentary about the last crusade of Martin Luther King Jr.; received Emmy and NAACP Image award nominations
- The Old Forest
- Game of Catch: (based on Richard Wilbur's short story of the same name)
- Searching for Wordin Avenue
