= Virginia Evelyn Ross =

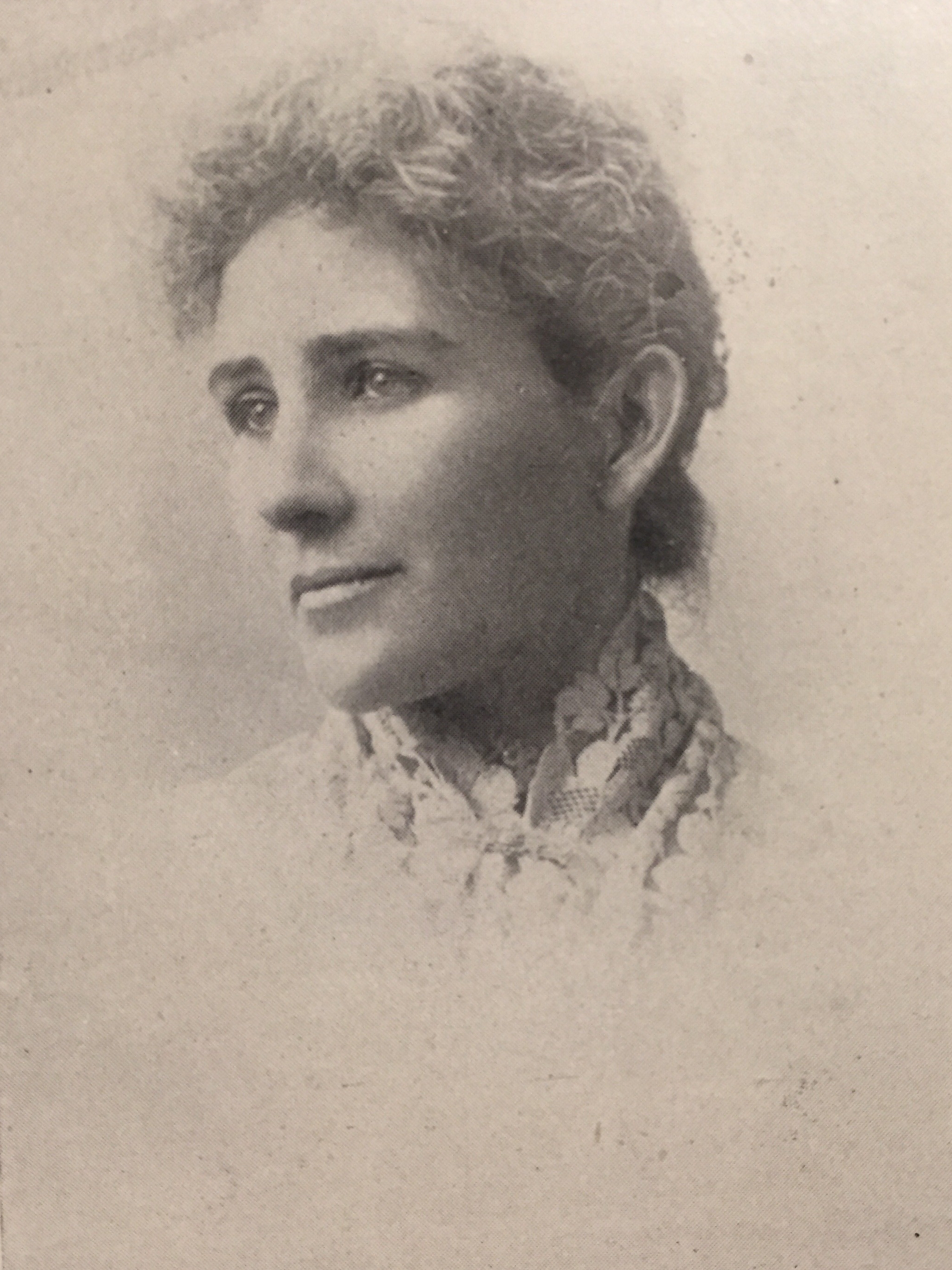
Virginia Evelyn Ross

Virginia Evelyn Conlee Ross (February 1, 1857 – June 10, 1923) was an American author.

== Early life ==
Virginia Evelyn Conlee Ross was born in Galena, Illinois, on February 1, 1857. She was the youngest of twelve children of John H. Conlee. She came of a hardy pioneer class of genuine Americans. She moved with her parents to Charles City, Iowa, in 1864, but the restless spirit of the pioneer settler carried them to Johnson County, Nebraska, in 1869, where Ross passed the greater part of her early life.

== Career ==
She received only the rudiments of a text-book education, but her talent sprang into activity, like the crystal flow from a mountain spring. Not being possessed of a strong physical body, she taxed herself severely.

Her series of articles entitled "To Brides, Past, Present and Future," and "Hints to Husbands," were extensively copied. Her literary work was confined to newspapers and magazines, and her publishers kept their demand for material far ahead of her ability to produce. Her numerous poems showed a high order of talent.

== Personal life ==
Virginia Evelyn Ross became the wife of Alderman Thomas J. Ross, in 1879 and had two children, Mrs. A. W. Hickman and Harry W. Ross, managing editor of the Wisconsin State Journal. She was a model housekeeper, wife and mother, and found time, with all her home and society duties, to execute some beautiful paintings. She lived in Omaha, Nebraska. In 1896 they moved to 190 W. Gilman St., Madison, Wisconsin.

She died on June 10, 1923, in Madison, Wisconsin.
