= Justice Ross =

Justice Ross may refer to:

- Jonathan Ross (senator) (1826–1905), chief justice of the Vermont Supreme Court
- Erskine Mayo Ross (1845–1928), associate justice of the Supreme Court of California
- Henry D. Ross (1861–1945), associate justice and chief justice of the Arizona Supreme Court
- John Wilson Ross (1863–1945), associate justice of the Arizona Supreme Court

== See also ==
- Judge Ross (disambiguation)
