= Bob Ross (footballer, born 1901) =

English footballer

Personal information
- Full name: Robert Ross
- Date of birth: 11 March 1901
- Place of birth: Stenhousemuir, Falkirk, Scotland
- Position: Centre half

Senior career*
Years	Team	Apps	(Gls)
1921–1922	Falkirk		
1922–1923	Stenhousemuir		
1923–1924	Plymouth Argyle	2	(0)
1924–1925	Coventry City	21	(0)
1925–1928	Workington		
1928–1929	Carlisle United	24	(2)
1929–1930	Wrexham	32	(1)
1930–1931	Scunthorpe & Lindsey United		
1931–1932	Boston Town		
1932–1933	Hyde United	16	(2)
- * Club domestic league appearances and goals

Robert Ross (born 11 March 1901) was a Scottish professional footballer who played as a centre half. He made appearances in the English Football League with Plymouth Argyle, Coventry City, Carlisle United and Wrexham.
