= Ronald Ross (disambiguation) =

Ronald Ross (1857–1932) was an English physician and Nobel laureate; discoverer of the malaria parasite

Ronald Ross may also refer to:

- Sir Ronald Ross, 2nd Baronet (1888–1968), Irish politician; Ulster Unionist Northern Irish member of parliament
- Ronald Ross (basketball) (born 1983), American professional basketball player
- Ronald Ross (shinty player) (born 1975), Scottish sportsman; shinty player for Kingussie
- Ronnie Ross (1933–1991), British jazz baritone saxophonist
- Ronald J. Ross, American radiologist
- Ron Ross (Nebraska politician) (born 1954)
