= Alexander David Ross =

Scots-born physicist, mathematician and astronomer

Prof Alexander David Ross FRSE FRAS FRSA FIP FAIP FEIS FEISA LLD (1883–1966) was a 20th-century Scots-born physicist, mathematician and astronomer living in Australia. He was an expert on magnetism and rare earths. He was twice President of the Western Australia Astronomical Society: 1915 to 1917 and 1950 to 1952, 33 years apart.

== Life ==
He was born in Glasgow on 7 September 1883 the son of David Ross DD, rector of the Church of Scotland Training College, and his wife Marion Johnston. The family lived at 17 Carnarvan Street in Glasgow. He was educated at the Church of Scotland Normal School and Glasgow High School. He took some courses at the University of London then matriculated at the University of Glasgow in 1902. He graduated MSc in Maths and Physics in 1906. He was a Thomson Research Fellow and a Houldsworth Research Fellow, using the latter to spend two summers at the University of Göttingen in Germany. From 1908 he lectured in Physics at Glasgow University.

In 1909 he was elected a Fellow of the Royal Society of Edinburgh. His proposers were Andrew Gray, William Jack, George Chrystal, and Cargill Gilston Knott.

In 1912 he emigrated to Australia to become Professor of Maths and Physics at the University of Western Australia in Perth. In 1914 he was awarded the Kelvin Medal for research.

In the Second World War he was Consultant Physicist to the Royal Australian Navy.

He retired in 1952.

He died on 14 December 1966 at Albany, Western Australia.

== Family ==
In 1913 he married Euphemia Irvine.
