= Malcolm Ross =

Malcolm Ross may refer to:

- Malcolm Ross (balloonist) (1919–1985), American record-setting balloonist
- Malcolm Ross (courtier) (1943–2019), Lord Prior of the Most Venerable Order of the Hospital of Saint John of Jerusalem
- Malcolm Ross (journalist) (1862–1930), New Zealand journalist, mountaineer, and war correspondent
- Malcolm Ross (linguist) (born 1942), Australian specialist in Austronesian and Papuan linguistics
- Malcolm Ross (literary critic) (1911–2002), Canadian literary critic
- Malcolm Ross (musician) (born 1960), Scottish guitarist
- Malcolm Ross (school teacher) (born 1946), Canadian Holocaust-denier
