= Thomas Ross (courtier) =

English courtier

- Born: 1620
- Died: 27 October 1675 (aged 54–55)
- Occupations: Courtier, poet, and translator

Thomas Ross (1620 – 27 October 1675) was an English courtier, poet, and translator. He was the tutor of James Scott, 1st Duke of Monmouth. James II of England accused Ross of having been the first person to inspire Monmouth's aspiration to be King.

== Biography ==
Ross was born in 1620. He was a near relative of the writer Alexander Ross. Ross may have received his education at Christ's College, Cambridge, where one Thomas Rosse, son of James Rosse, of Richmond, Surrey, who was educated at the Charterhouse, graduated B.A. in 1642–3. He adhered to Charles II in his exile, was employed in political intrigues of that period, and about 1658 became tutor to James Scott (afterwards Duke of Monmouth), the king's natural son. James II in his "Memoirs" charges Ross with first inspiring his pupil with hope of the throne. The youth had been originally instructed in the catholic religion by the Oratorians, and the change of tutor involved a change of religion by Charles's order. Ross applied to Dr. Cosin, and told him he might do a great service to the church of England in keeping out popery if he would sign a certificate of the marriage of Charles II with his pupil's mother, Lucy Walter, who was one of the doctor's penitents. Ross promised to conceal this certificate during the doctor's lifetime. Cosin indignantly rejected the proposal, and afterwards acquainted the king with the transaction. His majesty thought fit to keep the matter secret, but shortly after the Restoration removed Ross from his situation on another pretext, and divulged the affair some years later, when the story of the "Black Box" was obtaining credence.

Ross was then appointed to the office of constable of Launceston Castle, which he resigned in July 1661, and on 22 August in that year he was constituted keeper of the king's library, with a salary of 200l. a year. He was created M.A. at Oxford on 28 September 1663. In the following year he acted as secretary to Henry Coventry, when the latter was sent on an embassy to the court of Sweden. In May 1665 he conferred upon Richard Pearson, then his deputy, the reversion of the office of keeper of the royal library, and he stated that he "is now at service in the fleet, and uncertain of subsistence for his family if he should die." He died ten years later, on 27 October 1675.

He was the author of:

- "The Second Punick War between Hannibal and the Romanes … Englished from the Latine of Silius Italicus; with a Continuation from the Triumph of Scipio to the Death of Hannibal" [in verse], London, 1661, fol. The dedication to the king is dated Bruges, 18 November 1657. There is a beautifully written copy of this book in the Harleian MS. 4233.
- "Advice of Mr. Thomas Ross to James Scott, Duke of Monmouth and Buccleugh, natural Son to King Charles II, by Mrs. Barnham, in imitation of Tully, concerning Offices or humane Duties, unto his Son Mark" (Lambeth MS. 931, art. 65).

Among the Ashmolean manuscripts at Oxford is a poem entitled "The Ghost of honest Tom Ross to his Pupill, D[uke] of M[onmouth]," and beginning "Shame of my life, disturber of my tombe." It was written after Ross's death.
