= James Ross (physician) =

Scottish physician

- Born: 11 January 1837; Kingussie, Scotland
- Died: February 25, 1892 (aged 55); Manchester, England
- Occupation: Physician

James Ross (11 January 1837 – 25 February 1892) was a Scottish physician.

== Biography ==
Ross was the third son of John Ross, a farmer, who was born at Kingussie in the highlands of Scotland on 11 January 1837. He was sent to the parish school of Laggan, and thence to the Normal College for Teachers in Edinburgh, but soon went to study medicine at Aberdeen, where he graduated M.B. and C.M. with the highest honours in 1863, and M.D. in 1864. He made two voyages to Greenland in a whaler, practised as an assistant for two years, and then began general practice at Newchurch in Rossendale, Lancashire. He attained considerable success in the district. He wrote articles in the ‘Practitioner,’ and published in 1869 ‘On Counter Irritation,’ in 1872 ‘The Graft Theory of Disease, being an Application of Mr. Darwin's Hypothesis of Pangenesis to the Explanation of the Phenomena of the Zymotic Diseases,’ and in 1874 ‘On Protoplasm, being an Examination of Dr. James Hutchinson Sterling's criticism of Professor Huxley's Views,’ all essays of considerable ingenuity, but somewhat involved in statement. In April 1876 he removed to Manchester, and in August was appointed pathologist to the infirmary. Though late in beginning the practical work of pathology, he laboured in the post-mortem room with all the enthusiasm of youth, and in October 1878 was elected assistant physician to the infirmary. In 1881 he published ‘A Treatise on the Diseases of the Nervous System,’ in two large volumes, of which a second edition appeared in 1883. He begins by a classification of these diseases into three groups, Æsthesioneuroses, Kinesioneuroses, and Trophoneuroses, or changes of sensation, of motion, and of nutrition, and then describes the diseases of the several regions of the nervous system in detail. The book contains much recent information on the subject, and some original observations and hypotheses. It was the first large modern textbook in English on its subject and was widely read. It led to his election as a fellow of the Royal College of Physicians in 1882. In 1885 he wrote a shorter ‘Handbook of Diseases of the Nervous System,’ which appeared in America, and in 1887 an essay on ‘Aphasia.’ He was elected professor of medicine at Owens College, Manchester, in 1887; and in 1888 became physician to the infirmary. In 1890 his last illness, which proved to be due to cancer of the stomach, began, and he died in Manchester on 25 February 1892. Besides numerous papers in medical journals and transactions on nervous diseases, he published in 1888 an address on evolution and in 1889 one on technical education He married, in 1869, Miss Bolton, niece of his predecessor in practice at Newchurch.
