= Hugh Ross =

Hugh Ross may refer to:

- Hugh Ross (musician) (c. 1898–1990), American choral director and conductor
- Hugh McGregor Ross (1917–2014), computing pioneer and specialist in the Gospel of Thomas
- Hugh Ross (Australian politician) (1846–1912), New South Wales Labor politician
- Hugh Ross (Northern Ireland politician) (born c. 1944), Northern Ireland Presbyterian minister and member of the Orange Order
- Hugh Ross (astrophysicist) (born 1945), astrophysicist and Christian apologist
- Hugh Ross (actor) (born 1945), Scottish actor
- Hugh Ross (bridge) (1937–2017), American contract bridge player
- Hugh Ross (editor), film and television editor and voice actor
