= Edward T. Ross =

American sanitary engineer and inspector

- Born: 1886
- Died: 1957 (aged 70–71)
- Occupations: Sanitary engineer and inspector

Edward T. Ross (1886–1957), sometimes referred to as Edwin T. Ross, was an American sanitary engineer and inspector who was the first staff sanitary engineer of California's State Board of Health. He was the head and the only founding member of California's Bureau of Sanitary Inspections. Ross had a successful 33-year-long career at the California Health Department. He was also a contributor to The Sanitarian journal, where he and his colleagues described the latest developments and achievements in the field of sanitary engineering.

== Career ==
Ross became the staff sanitary engineer of California State Health Board in 1913. He immediately began the inspection process after.

"Between 1913 and 1917, 'Sanitary Reports' provided by SBOH provide an important body of evidence documenting health and sanitation conditions of hundreds of towns in the state, including municipal dumping practices. These reports are on file at the State Archives in Sacramento." Ross has performed great amount of sanitary inspections in the following cities: Sacramento, San-Francisco, Modesto, Fresno, Stockton, Oakland, and more. His inspections include but are not limited to his inspection of boats in San-Francisco, when he declared that they are the most sanitary in the world.

Ross has supervised and carried out a number of sanitary changes to a number of cities. Under his supervision, a sewer system was installed in the city of Galt.

=== Fight with rabies ===
July 21 of 1916 Ross reported that the situation with rabies in Sacramento was under control thanks to his campaign. In collaboration with hunters "mad" species of the following: coyotes (41), pole-cats (11), bobcats (8), dogs (16), domestic cats (5) were killed. In 1930 Ross and William Deal (inspector under Ross) were sent to Modesto following the report that rabies made 36 people sick. They investigated the area and provided help to those affected.

=== Fight with mosquitoes ===
Ross was responsible for managing the mosquitoes and malaria outbreak in California. He was conducting a detailed survey and providing recommendations on how to deal with Malaria.

=== Retirement ===
Ross retired in 1947. He was regarded as a very respectable person in the field, founding member of the California's Bureau of Sanitary Inspections. His work was celebrated in December at collective meeting.

== The "Sanitarian" ==
Ross has an entry in the Sanitarian Journal where he describes "The Federal Food, Drug, and Cosmetic Act of 1938".

== Family ==
Edward T. Ross was married to Cora E. Ross. They resided on 2317 Q, Sacramento, California, US.
