= Joel Ross =

Joel Ross may refer to:

- Joel Ross (DJ) (born 1977), British DJ
- Joel Ross (American football) (born 1992), American football cornerback
- Joel Ross (tennis), American tennis player
- Joel Ross (vibraphonist), American jazz musician
