= Lillian Ross =

Lillian Ross may refer to:

- Lillian Ross (politician), Canadian politician
- Lillian Ross (journalist) (1918–2017), American journalist and writer
