= Ross Campbell =

Ross Campbell may refer to:

- Ross Campbell (composer), Scottish composer
- Ross Campbell (diplomat) (1918–2007), Canadian diplomat
- Ross Campbell (footballer) (born 1987), Scottish professional football player
- Ross Campbell (writer) (1910–1982), Australian humorist.
- Sophie Campbell, comics creator formerly known as Ross Campbell
