= Scott Ross =

Scott Ross may refer to:

- Scott Ross (film executive) (born 1951), Founder, Chairman, and CEO of Digital Domain (1993–2006); pioneer in digital entertainment
- Scott Ross (1939-2023), interviewer for The 700 Club with ties to various 1960s and 1970s rock musicians
- Scott Ross (American football) (1968–2014), American football player
- Scott Ross (Oz), character on the HBO series Oz
- Scott Ross (private investigator)
- Scott Ross (harpsichordist) (1951–1989)
