= Alan Ross (footballer, born 1933) =

English footballer (born 1933)

Personal information
- Date of birth: 7 February 1933 (age 93)
- Place of birth: Ellesmere Port, England
- Position: Goalkeeper

Senior career*
Years	Team	Apps	(Gls)
	Bishop Auckland	?	(?)
1956–1957	Oldham Athletic	3	(0)
1958–1959	Accrington Stanley	1	(0)
1959–1960	Wigan Rovers	?	(?)
Total		4	(0)
- * Club domestic league appearances and goals

Alan Ross (born 7 February 1933) is an English footballer who played as a goalkeeper in the Football League.
