= George Berkeley Ross =

American IT pioneer

- Born: January 24, 1918; Elizabeth, New Jersey, U.S.
- Died: September 1, 2006 (aged 88)
- Spouse: Virginia Louise Elkin
- Military career
- Service years: 1941–1961
- Rank: Major
- Units: 102nd Infantry Division (Ozark Division), 1st Cavalry Division
- Known for: Digitizing geological exploration in the oil industry
- Conflicts: World War II, Korean War

George Berkeley Ross (January 24, 1918 – September 1, 2006) was an early pioneer of information technology in the American petroleum industry who spearheaded the digitization of the exploration for petroleum.

== Biography ==
=== Early life at Humble ===
In 1936, Ross started his career working as a mail boy for Humble Oil in Midland, Texas, the epicenter of the oil boom. Ross married Virginia Louise Elkin of the well-established Midland family in 1941. Fifty years later after serving on the team that had developed the software to computerize the geological exploration for oil, Ross ended his long and successful career as a senior analyst for exploration systems in computer geology at Exxon.

Ross’s mathematical aptitude took him up the corporate ladder. After short stints as a gas station attendant in Odessa and the mailroom in Midland, he was tapped for the assignment of Field Lab Assistant plotting well logs in the Geologic Lease and Scouting Department, a post that permitted him to work alongside the Scouts in West Texas.

=== World War II ===
World War II intervened, and Ross served as a first lieutenant in the artillery corps of the Ozark Division of the 102nd Infantry in the Allied invasion of Europe.

A member of the US Army Reserve since his high school days in San Antonio, Ross’s mathematical background made him a natural for field artillery. He served with distinction in the European theatre. After landing at Normandy, Ross saw action as the Ozark Division advanced across the border between the Netherlands and Germany. They crossed the Wurm and Roer Rivers and occupied the sector from Homburg to Düsseldorf. In April 1945, Ross and the Ozark Division crossed the Rhine where they encountered stiff opposition in the Wesergebirge, then pushed on to the Elbe, where they halted on orders and established an outpost 48 miles (77 km) from Berlin, occupying their position until V-E Day.

=== Wildcatting in Texas and New Mexico ===
During the post-war period, Ross remained in the US Army Reserve. Shortly after his return to Texas, Humble’s Chief Scout, Dave Fransen, urged Ross to accept the position of Junior Scout in West Texas. In his new capacity, Ross worked with wildcats drilling in the Kelly-Snyder Field and the Sprayberry Trend Area Field, an area fifty-five miles long and twenty miles wide that now contains two thousand oil wells.

In 1953, the Rosses moved their growing family to Roswell, New Mexico, which had become a hive of wildcatting that kept Ross busy monitoring leases, expiration dates and drilling schedules.

The Korean War intervened, and Ross was recalled to active military duty. Serving as a major in Field Artillery Operations with the 1st Cavalry Division in Korea and Japan, Ross supervised supply chain management for forces engaged on the peninsula. After he completed two years of service, Ross came home to Roswell now as a Senior Scout, but soon he and his family returned to corporate headquarters in Midland where he continued to contribute to Humble’s drilling success.

=== The Pentagon years and the Short Range Committee ===
At the same time, Ross maintained his military commission and served annual tours at the Pentagon under a succession of Secretaries of Defence: Charles E. Wilson; Neil H. McElroy and Thomas S. Gates. With twenty years of military service behind him, Ross retired from the Army, but he remained an active veteran attending annual reunions into this century. It was at the Pentagon in the late fifties where Ross first learned about the potential of computerization and information technology and became privy to the work of the Short Range Committee that led to the origin of COBOL (Common Business-Oriented Language).

=== Writing code in COBOL and FORTRAN ===
The need to control and manage the torrent of information and geological data flooding into the petroleum corporations inspired Ross and a small group of perceptive industry savants to pursue the adaptation of computing technology and harness it to the geological exploration for oil. In order to contribute to the design of a viable corporate information technology strategy, Ross taught himself COBOL and the IBM Mathematical Formula Translating System (FORTRAN). Very esoteric subjects in 1962, computer programming and software development would have mystified the average person, but for Ross, a naturally gifted mathematician, they were a piece of cake. He was to become a self-taught expert in many fields. In addition to his studies of computer programming, Ross studied law, geology, economics, mathematics and government.

=== Computerizing geological exploration for petroleum ===
In the early 1960s, the major companies set up the Permian Basin Well Data System, and Ross was selected for work on three of its key committees. In addition to developing computer codes, Ross helped design formats for reporting data relevant to geological exploration. In 1966, Humble began to organize its own internal Information Systems project, and Ross was appointed a member of the first group in Midland. By this time, Ross had been named Scouting Supervisor, but with the pace of technological change his duties increasingly focused on the analysis of records that could best be done by computerization.

In 1970, Ross was promoted to his new post as a Senior Analyst in Computer Geology for the Exploration Information Systems based at the Humble corporate headquarters in Houston. In his new capacity, Ross managed the computerization of an important portion of the oil industry, geological exploration. Ross had started working in geological analysis when recordkeeping was completely manual, and he had been an integral player in the digitization of the most crucial part of the industry, exploration for new sources of petroleum.

=== Later life ===
In 1986 on his fiftieth anniversary with Humble-Exxon, Ross was the subject of a lengthy article in Exploration Update that highlighted his pivotal contribution to the industry. He retired later that year to enter an active retirement filled with travel, cultural pursuits and charitable activities.

A lifelong enthusiast of museums, libraries, the theatre and cultural institutions, Ross launched into a whirlwind of activities to support worthy causes. The Alley Theater, the Commemorative Air Force, the Pioneers of the Permian Basin, American Indian College, Lindenwood University and Mount Holyoke College all benefited from his patronage.

Ross was keenly interested in the conservation of natural resources, especially petroleum, and he was an authority on public transportation. An advocate of rail travel, he supported many railroad organizations in Texas and in several other states. Ross firmly believed that government could and should do much more to invest in rebuilding America’s railroads and adapting new light rail systems for urban transport.

In Europe, Ross admired the much more advanced public transportation systems. While travelling on Eurostar, a high speed train that runs through the Channel Tunnel between Paris and London, Ross experienced a vision of the future of swift, clean, efficient and ecologically sound mass transit that inspired him to carry his message to the powers that be back home in America. Many public officials benefited from Ross’s analyses of the need for a more serious approach to mass transportation in America in general and Texas in particular.

In addition to his many public and official pursuits, Ross was a ballroom dancer, and would regularly dance at the Petroleum Club of Houston and Lechner’s, a favourite restaurant in Houston. Ross performed to the Waltz and the Polka, as well as the Texas Two-Step.
