= Lewis Ross =

Lewis Ross may refer to:

- Lewis Williams Ross (1827–1902), American politician from Iowa
- Lewis Winans Ross (1812–1895), American politician from Illinois
- Lewis Ross (Canadian politician) (1825–1882)

== See also ==
- Louis W. Ross (1893–1966), American architect
- Louis Ross (American football) (born 1947), American football player
- Louis S. Ross, inventor of the Ross (steam automobile)
