= Christopher Ross (writer) =

British writer

Christopher Ross (born 1960) is a non-fiction writer and martial artist, practising in Iaido, Kung Fu and Yoshinkan aikido. He has written the books Tunnel Visions: Journeys of an Underground Philosopher and Mishima's Sword: Travels In Search Of A Samurai Legend. His books typically take on a philosophical note as well as informing on the subject matter. Ross currently is moving about, without a fixed place of abode. The Irish Times described Ross as a "likeable narrator" who is "never superior."

He is an expert cook and a keen amateur photographer.
