= Alex Ross (disambiguation) =

Alex Ross (born 1970) is an American comic book painter, illustrator and plotter.

Alex Ross may also refer to:

- Alex Ross (American football) (born 1992), American football quarterback for the San Diego Fleet
- Alex Ross (cricketer) (born 1992), Australian cricketer
- Alex Ross (music critic) (born 1968), American music critic
- Alex Ross (politician) (1880–1953), stonemason, politician and cabinet minister from Alberta, Canada
- Alex Ross (rower) (1907–1994), New Zealand rower
- Alex Ross (rugby union) (1905–1996), Australian rugby union footballer

== See also ==
- Alexander Ross (disambiguation)
- Alec Ross (disambiguation)
