= Richard Ross =

Richard Ross, or variants, may refer to:

- Richard Ross (basketball) (Richard David Ross Jr, born 1992), American basketball player
- Richard Ross (photographer) (fl. from 1989), American photographer
- Richard C. Ross (1927–2012), American politician in the New York State Assembly
- Richard J. Ross (born 1954), Massachusetts State Senator
- Richard P. Ross Jr. (1906–1990), United States Marine Corps general
- Richard S. Ross (1924–2015), American cardiologist
- Rick Ross (William Leonard Roberts II, born 1976), American rapper
- Rick Alan Ross (born 1952), consultant and founder of the Cult Education Institute
- Ricky Ross (musician) (born 1957), Scottish musician known for his work with the Deacon Blue
- Freeway Ricky Ross (Ricky Donnell Ross, born 1960), American author and former drug lord
- Dick Ross, 1920s American baseball player
- Jack Ross (footballer, born 1911) (Richard John Ross, 1911–1996)

== See also ==
- Rick Rock, American record producer
- Richard Younger-Ross (born 1953), English politician
- Richard Ross Museum of Art, Delaware, Ohio, United States
