= Alexander Ross (Australian politician) =

Scottish-born Australian politician

Alexander Ross (21 November 1843 – 27 September 1912) was a Scottish-born Australian politician.

He was born at Rutherglen in Lanarkshire to manufacturer Alexander Ross and Janet Forrest. He received a primary education and emigrated to South Australia with his family in 1854, settling near Gumeracha. In 1867 the family moved to Albury, where they acquired farm land. In 1898 he married Ada Smyles. In 1900 Ross was appointed to the New South Wales Legislative Council, where he served until his death at Randwick in 1912. At his death he held property around Inverell, Coleambally, Harden, Hay and Macquarie Fields.
