= Henry Ross (disambiguation) =

Henry Ross (1829–1854) was a Canadian-Australian gold miner.

Henry Ross may also refer to:

- Henry H. Ross (1790–1862), New York politician
- Henry D. Ross (1861–1945), American jurist and politician
- Harry Ross (1881–1953), Scottish footballer
