= Jimmy Ross (footballer, born 1895) =

Scottish footballer

Personal information
- Full name: James Donaldson Ross
- Date of birth: 7 March 1895
- Place of birth: Bonnyrigg, Scotland
- Date of death: 5 November 1962 (aged 67)
- Place of death: Lasswade, Midlothian
- Height: 5 ft 8 in (1.73 m)
- Position: Right back

Senior career*
Years	Team	Apps	(Gls)
- Raith Rovers
1923–1924	Tottenham Hotspur	7	(0)
- * Club domestic league appearances and goals

James Donaldson Ross (7 March 1895 – 5 November 1962) was a Scottish professional footballer who played for Raith Rovers and Tottenham Hotspur.

== Football career ==
Ross joined Tottenham Hotspur from Raith Rovers in 1923. The right back made seven appearances for the White Hart Lane club.
