= Frank Ross =

Frank Ross may refer to:

== Sportspeople ==
- Frank Ross (Scottish footballer) (born 1998), for Aberdeen FC
- Frank Ross (Australian footballer) (1900–1975), Australian rules footballer for South Melbourne

== Fictional characters ==
- Frank Ross, protagonist of the British miniseries Out
- Frank Ross, hero of the film Each Dawn I Die, played by James Cagney

== Others ==
- Frank Ross (Scottish politician) (born 1959), lord provost of Edinburgh (2017-2022)
- Frank Elmore Ross (1874–1960), American astronomer and physicist
- Frank F. Ross (1867–1931), U.S. Army soldier and recipient of the Medal of Honor
- Frank Mackenzie Ross (1891–1971), lieutenant governor of British Columbia, Canada
- Frank Ross (producer) (1904–1990), film producer and screenwriter
- Frank Ross (born 1977), real name of rapper Nitty
