= Alec Ross (disambiguation) =

Alec Ross (1881–1952) was a Scottish golfer.

Alec Ross may also refer to:

- Alec Ross (author) (born 1971), advisor to Secretary of State Hillary Clinton
- Alec Ross (actor) (1922–1971), actor and first husband of Sheila Hancock
- Alec Ross (tour guide) (1936–2017), Australian tour guide
- Alec Ross (footballer) (1902–1985), Scottish footballer for Dundee, Arbroath and Rochdale

== See also ==
- Alexander Ross (disambiguation)
- Alex Ross (disambiguation)

Oooooo
