= Andrew Ross (artist) =

American sculptor

Andrew Ross (b. 1989) is an American sculptor working across traditional and new media. His works examine the fraught relationship between objects and images in the digital age. Ross merges a broad range of art, historical, and scientific references into fragmentary constructions that combine figures, objects, and spaces with a nod to the metaphoric associations they elicit.

For instance, in a 2017 show at False Flag Projects, Ross embedded portraits of Neil DeGrasse Tyson into the faces of flowers populating one of his sculptures, adorning representations of the natural world with the likeness of a public figure who explains the fundamental laws governing nature to a popular audience.

His aluminum sculptures of Bugs Bunny was exhibited at Art Basel Miami Beach 2021.

Ross earned his BFA from Cooper Union and attended Skowhegan School of Painting and Sculpture. He has taught at Bruce High Quality Foundation University, SUNY New Paltz, and The Cooper Union.
