= Andrew Ross (footballer, born 1988) =

British Virgin Islands footballer

Ross Andrew
Personal information
- Date of birth: 16 January 1988 (age 38)
- Place of birth: Scotland
- Position: Forward

Youth career
- Dyce Boys Club

International career^{‡}
Years	Team	Apps	(Gls)
2019–	British Virgin Islands	4	(0)
- ‡ National team caps and goals as of 15 February 2020

Ross Andrew (born 16 January 1988) is a Scotland-born Virgin Islander footballer who plays as a forward for the British Virgin Islands national football team.

== Career ==
=== International career ===
Ross made his senior international debut on 24 March 2019, coming on as a halftime substitute for Leo Forte in a 2–1 defeat to Bonaire during CONCACAF Nations League qualifying.

== Personal life ==
Ross, a native of Scotland, works as a construction manager and supports Aberdeen.

== Career statistics ==
=== International ===
As of match played 13 October 2019

National team	Year	Apps	Goals
British Virgin Islands	2019	4	0
Total		4	0
