= Lester Piano Company =

American piano manufacturer

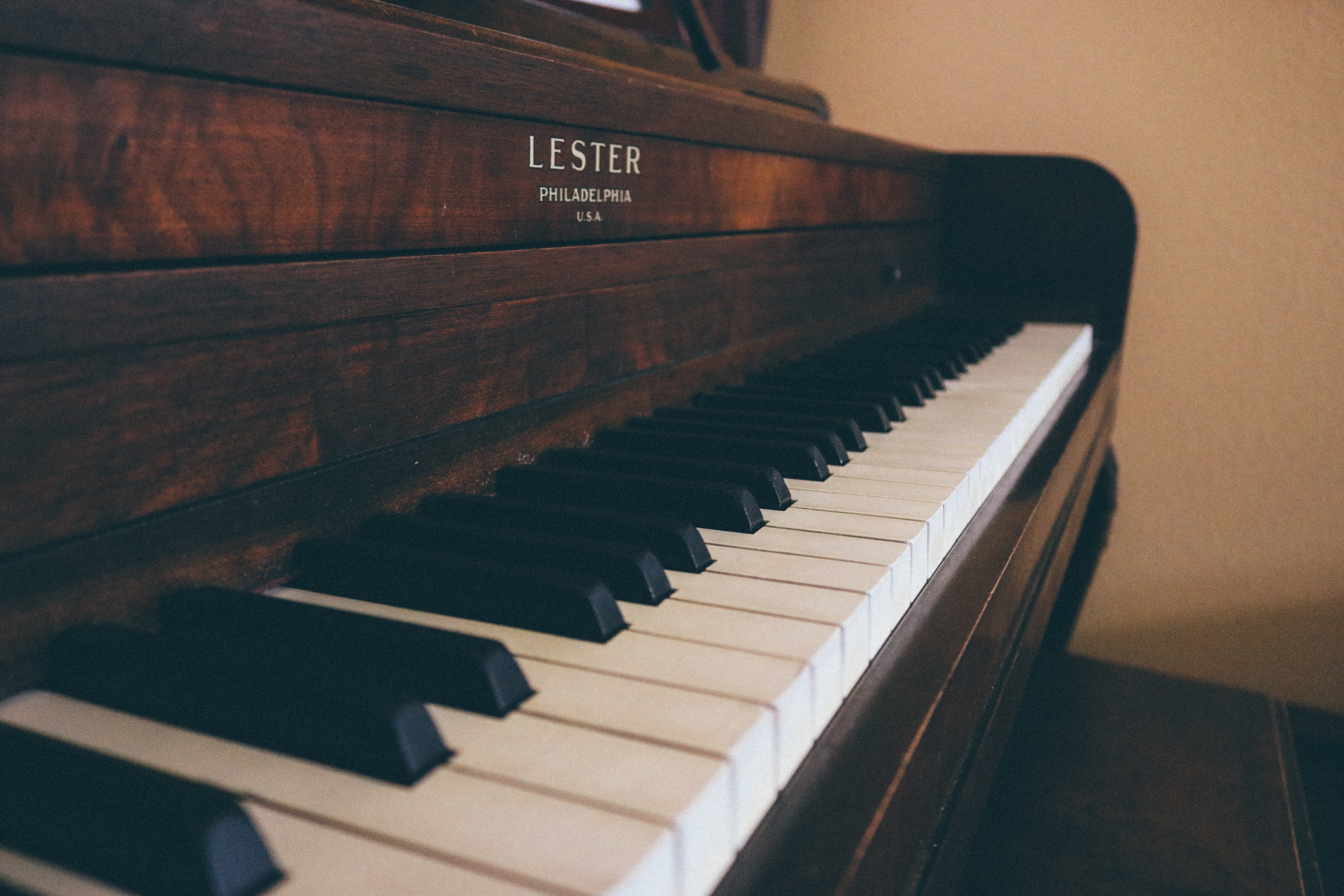
- Industry: Piano manufacturer
- Founded: 1888; 138 years ago
- Defunct: 1961
- Fate: Closed
- Headquarters: Philadelphia
- Products: Pianos

The Lester Piano Company was a piano manufacturer headquartered in Philadelphia, Pennsylvania. It was founded in 1888 and closed in 1961.

== History ==
Philadelphia established itself as the country's first major center for piano manufacturing, with over 80 piano makers in the city in the early 19th century. The industry boomed after the American Civil War, and piano manufacturers established facility on Chestnut Street between 9th and 13th Streets. This stretch became known as "Piano Row." As mass production became viable, many companies maintained salesrooms on Piano Row, but established factories outside the city proper. Lester was one of these companies, with offices in the F.A. North Building at 1306 Chestnut Street, Philadelphia, and a factory in Tinicum Township. (Note: The F.A. North Company is not mentioned in the sources, but it may have been the same company as Lester, or a precursor.)

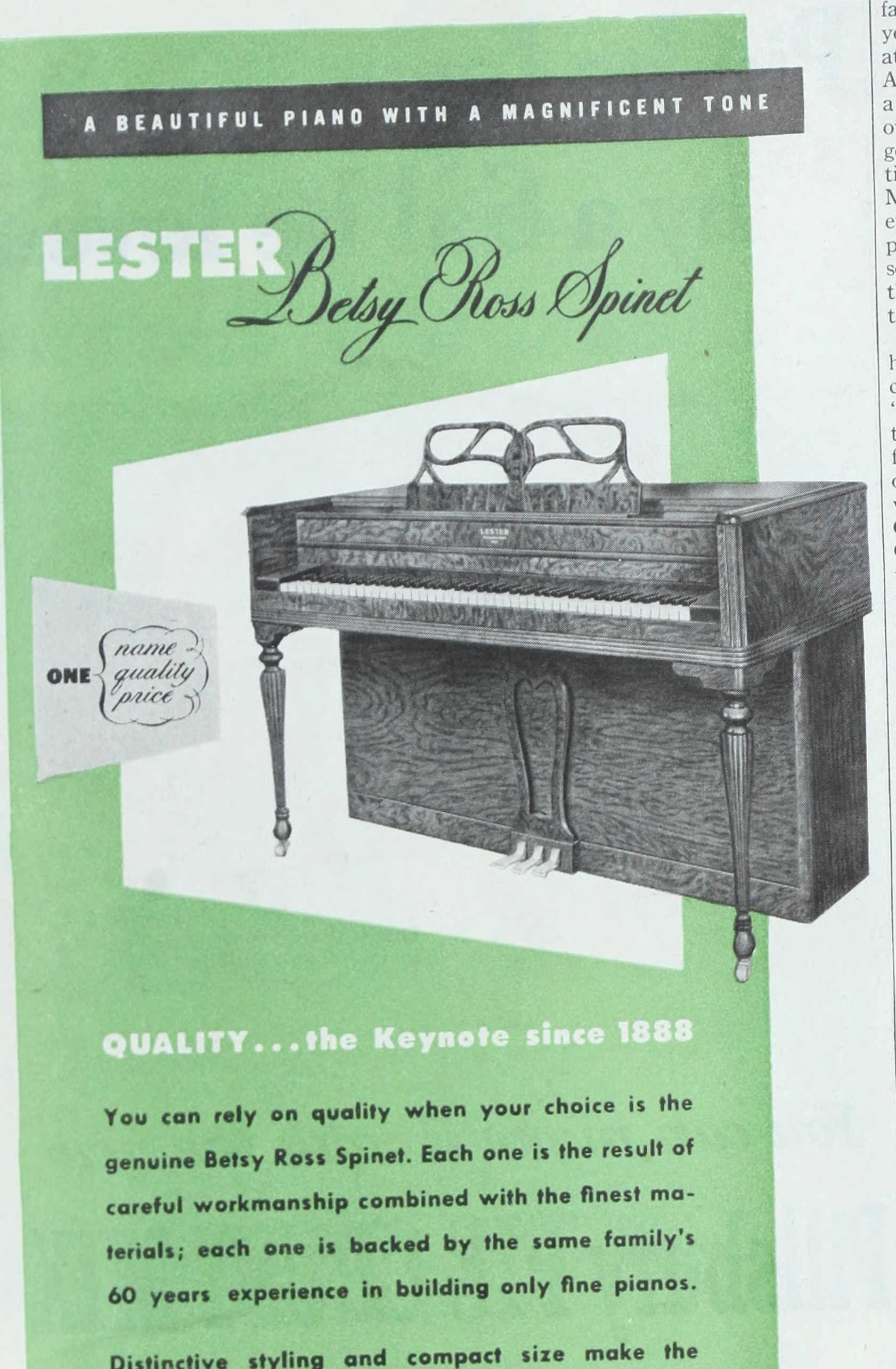
A 1948 ad for Lester Betsy Ross spinets

Lester was one of the few Philadelphia piano manufacturers to survive the Great Depression. With decreased demand for luxury pianos, the companies that survived were the ones that pivoted to mass-producing affordable instruments. It was at this time that Lester introduced its cheaply manufactured line of "Betsy Ross" spinet pianos.

Over the course of the 20th century, Philadelphia was eclipsed by other American cities as centers for piano manufacturing. Lester and Schomaker (by Wanamaker's) were the last Philadelphia piano companies to close, with Lester ending manufacturing in 1961. The company cited sharp competition, as well a lack of viable merger opportunities, for its closure. At its peak, Lester employed more than 500 people. This number had decreased to around 100 by the time the company closed.

Musicians cited as preferring Lester pianos included Louise Homer, Giuseppe Campanari, Alice Nielsen, Franz Kneisel, and Bella Alten.

== Products ==
Lester manufactured pianos under a variety of names in addition to its own. Prior to 1920, these included Leonard & Co., Alden, and Gounod. Following 1930, these included Bellaire, Cable & Sons, Channing, Gramer, Lawrence, Regent, Schilling, and Schubert.

Lester was known for its Betsy Ross line of spinet and console pianos, manufactured between 1936 and 1960. Many Betsy Ross pianos were equipped with Dampp-Chaser systems that provided humidity control. Pianos with the Custom Series label were manufactured with special, distinctive cabinetwork.

Around 1947, Lester introduced plastic parts in its piano actions. Because plastic was a relatively new material for consumer goods, its usage in pianos was untested. The plastic parts soon began to fail, prompting the company to issue a product recall.
