= Carole Ferrier =

Australian feminist academic

- Scientific career
- Thesis: The earlier poetry of D. H. Lawrence: a variorum text, comprising all extant incunabula and published poems up to and including the year 1919 (1971)

Carole Ferrier is an Australian feminist academic. She is Professor in English at the School of English, Media Studies and Art History at the University of Queensland. She has many published works about feminism, socialism, literature and culture. She has been the editor of the radical feminist academic journal Hecate since its inception in 1975.

== Early life ==
Ferrier was awarded a Bachelor of Arts Degree with Honours in London, and a PhD in New Zealand, at the University of Auckland. The title of her doctoral thesis was The earlier poetry of D. H. Lawrence: a variorum text, comprising all extant incunabula and published poems up to and including the year 1919. Ferrier helped establish the International Socialist Tendency in Australia in the 1970s, and was a prominent activist in various democratic rights struggles in Queensland from the 1970s.

== Academic work ==
Ferrier has lectured in English at the University of Queensland since 1973. She is currently Professor of Literature and Women's Studies at the School of Communication and Arts at the University of Queensland. Ferrier is also the Director of the Women, Gender, Culture and Social Change Research Group at the University of Queensland, a former president of the Australian Women's Studies Association and editor of Hecate and the Australian Women's Book Review.

== Publications and editorial work ==
Amongst her many other published works, Ferrier has authored Jean Devanny: Romantic Revolutionary (Melbourne University Press, 1999).

She has also edited

- Hecate: An Interdisciplinary Journal of Women's Liberation (as foundation editor])
- Radical Brisbane: An Unruly History. Melbourne: Vulgar Press 2004. (with Raymond Evans)
- Gender, Politics and Fiction: 20th Century Australian Women's Novels. St Lucia: UQP, 1992.
- Point of Departure: The Autobiography of Jean Devanny. St Lucia: UQP, 1986.
- As Good as a Yarn With You: Letters Between Franklin, Prichard, Devanny, Barnard, Eldershaw and Dark. Sydney: Cambridge University Press, 1994.
- Janet Frame: A Reader. London: Women's Press, 1995.

== Criticism ==
Ferrier's 1992 book Gender, Politics and Fiction was criticised as using orthodox Marxist doctrine, the phenomenology of Paul Feyerabend and Thomas Kuhn, the post-structuralist work of Jacques Derrida and Gilles Deleuze into an "epistemic certainty".

== See also ==
- List of feminists
