= James Ross (rugby union) =

Scotland international rugby union player

Jimmy Ross
- Born: James Ross; 15 February 1880 Rutherford, Roxburghshire, Scotland
- Died: 31 October 1914 (aged 34) Mesen, Belgium

Rugby union career
Amateur team(s)
Years	Team	Apps	(Points)
1901-03	London Scottish		
Provincial / State sides
Years	Team	Apps	(Points)
1901	Provinces District		
1901	Anglo-Scots		
International career
Years	Team	Apps	(Points)
1901–03	Scotland	5	
- Military career
- Allegiance: United Kingdom
- Service years: 1914
- Conflicts: Messines

Jimmy Ross (15 February 1880 – 31 October 1914) was a Scotland international rugby union player.

== Rugby Union career ==
=== Amateur career ===
He played for London Scottish FC which he had captained in 1901-02 and 1904–05.

=== Provincial career ===
He played for Provinces District on 12 January 1901.

He played for Anglo-Scots against South of Scotland District on 25 December 1901.

=== International career ===
He was capped for Scotland five times between 1901 and 1903.

==== International appearances ====
Opposition	Score	Result	Date	Venue	Ref(s)
Wales	18–0	Win	9 February 1901	Inverleith	
Ireland	9–5	Win	23 February 1901	Inverleith	
England	3–18	Win	9 March 1901	Blackheath	
Wales	14–5	Lost	1 February 1902	Cardiff	
England	6–10	Win	21 March 1903	Richmond	

== Military service ==
He was one of the first Scottish rugby internationalists to die in the First World War, and fell at Messines.

== Family ==
His brother Edward Ross, also gained a single cap in 1904.

== See also ==
- List of international rugby union players killed in action during the First World War
