= Children of Rain =

The Children of Rain was a 1960s folk trio from New York City, consisting of brother and sister Pam and Denis Meacham and singer/songwriter Alan Ross.

The group released the second-ever 45 rpm single of the famed 1960s’ anthem "Get Together" — later a classic by The Youngbloods — on Dot Records (45-16868) in April 1966.

Pam and Alan married in late 1967, forming the folk-rock group Ross Legacy and releasing Makes You Wanna Sigh, written by Pam’s brother and former Children of Rainer Denis, on the Philips label (40620) in 1969. At the encouragement of Music City mogul Buddy Killen, producer of R&B immortal Joe Tex and countless country stars, including Dolly Parton, Dottie West and Roger Miller, Pam & Alan Ross moved to Nashville in late August 1969. Killen produced the duo and published Alan’s songs with Tree Publishing Company from September 1969 through 1971. The couple appeared on over 300 television shows emanating from Nashville, from 1969–75. Ross went on to a 34-year career as a jingle writer/producer and studio session singer, his voice heard on over 1,100 commercial soundtracks for radio and TV. He continues today as a recording and occasional performing artist under the name wm Alan Ross.

Followers of record discographies, however, will not find the name Children of Rain under any Dot Records collections. Due to an inadvertent error on the label's part, their recording was released under the name Pam Meacham and the Children of Rain. Discographies continue to err, listing Pam's name only as the artist of record, and at that, misspelling it as Pam Meecham.

But the dauntingly sparse information on the group didn’t prevent British music journalist Rob Cochrane from tracking them down in the summer of 2017–51 years after their only release on Dot. Cochrane was drawn initially to their music via the group’s melancholic and wistful name—observed in March 2017 on an online auction. Cochrane shelved out $200 to purchase a rare eight-song acetate of the Children of Rain recorded at Delta Recording Corp., in New York City in late 1966, to see if the music matched the level of the group’s name. “They possess a spirited but haunting melancholia, a stunning back-bone of considered song-craft,” says Cochrane in his Sept. 2017 article on the Children of Rain for Culture Catch, “and had they fared better at the hands of time they would now undoubtedly be revered as innovators.”

In response to Cochrane’s article, the Children of Rain released the album "Revisited" globally, via CDBaby.com, on Dec. 11, 2017.
