= Dave Ross (rugby league) =

Australian rugby league player (1917–1998)

Personal information
- Full name: David Eric Ross
- Born: 29 October 1917 Sydney, New South Wales, Australia
- Died: 25 April 1998 (aged 80) Kingsgrove, New South Wales, Australia

Playing information
- Position: Wing
Club
Years	Team	Pld	T	G	FG	P
1938–40	St. George	5	2	0	0	6
1942	South Sydney	2	0	0	0	0
1945	St. George	10	2	0	0	6
	Total	17	4	0	0	12

Dave Ross (1917–1998) was an Australian rugby league footballer who played in the 1930s and 1940s.

== Playing career ==
Ross came to the St. George Dragons via the Arncliffe juniors and was graded in 1937. Ross played in the victorious St. George Reserve Grade grand final team of 1938, scoring a try in the match.

Ross went on to play 99 games for the Saints in all grades although World War II disrupted his career. Due to residential army rules in 1942, Ross was forced to play a few games with South Sydney Rabbitohs during 1942 and later, he starred in many Army Rugby League teams during 1943–1944. He returned to St. George in 1945 where he finished his long career.

== Death ==
Ross died on 25 April 1998 in Kingsgrove, New South Wales.
