= Alexander Ross (cricketer) =

Scottish cricketer and civil servant

Personal information
- Born: 3 January 1895; Arbroath, Angus, Scotland
- Died: 12 December 1972 (aged 77); Gosport, Hampshire, England
- Batting: Right-handed
- Role: Wicket-keeper

Career statistics
| Competition | First-class |
|---|---|
| Matches | 1 |
| Runs scored | 1 |
| Batting average | 1.00 |
| 100s/50s | 0/0 |
| Top score | 1 |
| Catches/stumpings | 0/0 |
- Source: Cricinfo, 17 February 2019

Alexander Ross (3 January 1895 – 12 December 1972) was a Scottish first-class cricketer and civil servant.

Ross was born at Arbroath. He represented the Civil Service cricket team as the team's wicket-keeper in its only appearance in first-class cricket against the touring New Zealanders at Chiswick in 1927. Batting twice during the match, he ended the Civil Service first-innings unbeaten without scoring, while in their second-innings was dismissed for a single run by Roger Blunt, with the fall of his wicket giving the New Zealanders victory by an innings and 15 runs.

He died at Gosport in Southern England in December 1972.
