= Jane Ross =

Jane Ross may refer to:

- Jane Ross (collector) (1810–1879), Irish folksong collector
- Jane Ross (philanthropist) (1920–1999), American businesswoman and philanthropist
- Jane Ross (footballer) (born 1989), Scottish footballer
