= Dave MacSweeney =

Irish rugby union player

- Full name: David Anthony MacSweeney
- Born: 26 January 1930 Cappoquin, County Waterford, Ireland
- Died: 26 May 2010 (aged 80) London, England
- University: University of Cambridge

Rugby union career
- Position: Wing-forward
International career
Years	Team	Apps	(Points)
1955	Ireland	1	(0)

David Anthony MacSweeney (26 January 1930 — 26 May 2010) was an Irish international rugby union player.

MacSweeney was born in Cappoquin, County Waterford, and attended Rockwell College.

As a wing-forward, MacSweeney earned an Ireland cap against Scotland at Murrayfield in 1955, replacing Jim McCarthy. He was also a Cambridge blue and played for the varsity team, which faced the touring 1957–58 Wallabies.

== See also ==
- List of Ireland national rugby union players
