= Stephan Ross =

American Holocaust survivor

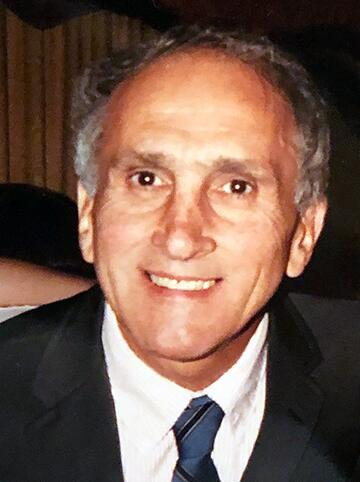
Stephan Ross, April 16, 2010

Stephan Ross (September 20, 1931 – February 24, 2020), also known as Steve Ross, was a Polish-American holocaust survivor who spearheaded the creation of the New England Holocaust Memorial.

== Early life ==
Ross was born Szmulek Rozental on September 20, 1931 near Łódź. He was the youngest of eight children. After the German Invasion of Poland, Ross' parents sent him to live with a Christian family. The family, however, feared punishment and sent Ross to live in the nearby woods.

== Imprisonment during the Holocaust ==
In 1940, Ross was taken by the Nazis to the labor camp at Budzyń; the first of ten labor or extermination camps he was imprisoned in. During his time in the camps, Ross was made to drink chemicals as part of the Nazi's medical experiments, had his back broken, and suffered from tuberculosis, lice, scales, and boils. He was selected for death at Budzyń, but stayed alive by hiding in a pile of feces in a latrine. He was later sent to Krasnik, Radon, and Auschwitz. At Auschwitz, Ross escaped a death line by running away and hiding under a moving train. After his escape he was sent to Bietingheim, Vayhingen, Unterexinggem, Grossachsenheim, Neckarsulm, and Dachau. At Dachau, conditions were so bad that the prisoners turned to cannibalism. On April 29, 1945, he was liberated from Dachau by U.S. soldiers. The rest of his family, save for one brother, did not survive.

== Life in the United States ==
On April 10, 1948, Ross was brought to the United States on the SS Marine Marlin, where he changed his name from Szmulek Rozental to Stephan Ross. He was placed with the Jewish Family and Children's Service in Boston, who sent him to the Windsor Mountain School. Ross was drafted by the United States Army and served during the Korean War. After the war, he attended Goddard College on the GI Bill. While there, he helped found the Plainfield Fire Department. He graduated from Goddard in 1959 and went on to earn his master's degree in psychology from Boston University. As he did not have enough money for both tuition and rent, he lived in his car while attending BU. He later earned a doctorate from Northeastern University.

Ross became a licensed psychologist and worked for 40 years as a youth activities instructor and counselor for the city of Boston's Department of Community Schools. He also taught and counseled at Northeastern.

=== New England Holocaust Memorial ===
In December 1986, Ross formed a committee to push for the creation of a Holocaust memorial and museum in Boston. He received support from Mayor Ray Flynn, who promised that the city would donate land for the memorial, as well as state representative Kevin W. Fitzgerald (whose father was one of the soldiers that liberated Dachau), first lady Kitty Dukakis, and Newton, Massachusetts Mayor Theodore D. Mann. The memorial was completed in 1995 at a cost of $3.5 million. In 2002, a Liberators' Monument, which was part of Ross' original vision for the memorial, was added.

== Personal life ==
In 1969, Ross married Suzanne London. Ross's marriage to London ended in divorce. They had one son, Michael P. Ross, who was the first Jewish president of the Boston City Council; and a daughter. His brother, the only other member of his family to survive the Holocaust, died in 1990. Ross resided in Newton, Massachusetts, until his death on February 24, 2020.

Ross spent decades trying to find an American soldier he met at Dachau who hugged him and gave him some food and an American flag. According to Ross, the soldier "gave me a will to live, he restored my faith. He was the first person to show me compassion, he took me back to the civilized world". In 1989, Ross appeared on an episode of Unsolved Mysteries as part of his search. Although the soldier, Steve Sattler, had died before the episode aired, his family saw it and met with Ross in 2012.

In 2010, Ross was named an Outstanding American by Choice by United States Citizenship and Immigration Services (USCIS).

In 2017, Etched in Glass: The Legacy of Steve Ross, a documentary about Ross' life, premiered at the Boston Jewish Film Festival. In 2018, his autobiography From Broken Glass: My Story of Finding Hope in Hitler's Death Camps to Inspire a New Generation was published.
