= Stephen L. Ross =

American politician

Stephen L. Ross (c. 1815 – January 4, 1891) was an American farmer and enslaver from Jacks Creek, Tennessee, who served two terms in the Tennessee State Senate and (very briefly) in the Tennessee House of Representatives.

== Background ==
Ross was born in Tennessee about 1815, the son of one Hugh Ross, later to be an early settler in Jacks Creek; his exact date and place of birth, and the nature and extent of his education are not known. He became a farmer by profession.

== Public office ==
Ross served as a Democratic member of the Senate during the 1857-58 session for the district including Henderson, Benton, Decatur, Humphreys, and Perry counties. He was elected once more to represent a district (the 18th) which no longer included Humphreys or Perry counties, but now did include Hardin, and McNairy counties. for the 1877-78 session. He was elected to the House for the 41st General Assembly in 1878 to represent Henderson County; while he took his place at January 1, 1879 opening of the session, he was granted an indefinite leave of absence because of illness on January 9. He resigned, and his successor Lafayette McHaney was elected and installed in office by March 6, 1879.

According to his 1891 obituary, he introduced the bill in the legislature which created Chester County, Tennessee, of which his home town would become a part when it was created in 1882.

== Personal life ==
Ross married a woman from Virginia named Eliza. Their oldest child, a daughter named Neden, was born around 1846; they would have four more children: John, Margaret, Hugh, and Alice. His place of burial is unknown. He died January 4, 1891, at his home.
