= Steven J. Ross (historian) =

American historian

Academic background
- Education: Columbia University (BA); University of Oxford (B.Phil); Princeton University (PhD)

Academic work
- Discipline: Film history
- Institutions: University of Southern California

Steven J. Ross is an American historian of film and culture. He is the Dean's Professor of History at the University of Southern California and the Myron and Marian Casden Director of the Casden Institute for the Study of the Jewish Role in American Life.

== Biography ==
Raised in Queens, New York, Ross attended Bayside High School and graduated from Columbia University in 1971, being the first person in his family to have graduated from college. He then earned a B.Phil. from the University of Oxford and a Ph.D. from Princeton University. In 1978, he joined the University of Southern California faculty, where his research focuses on working-class history, social history, film history, and political history.

His 1998 book, Working-Class Hollywood: Silent Film and the Shaping of Class in America, was nominated for a Pulitzer Prize and National Book Award in History and was named one of Los Angeles Times's "Best Nonfiction Books" for 1998.

His 2012 book, Hollywood Left and Right: How Movie Stars Shaped American Politics, received a Pulitzer Prize nomination and a Film Scholars Award from the Academy of Motion Picture Arts and Sciences.

His 2018 book Hitler in Los Angeles: How Jews Foiled Nazi Plots Against Hollywood and America was a Pulitzer Prize for History finalist and the 2018 Theatre Library Association Richard Wall Memorial Award.

His book The Secret War Against Hate: American Resistance to Antisemitism and White Supremacy was released on 28 April 2026.

From 2003 to 2006, and from 2007 to 2010, he was the chair of the department of history at the University of Southern California. Ross also directs the Casden Institute for the Study of the Jewish Role in American Life and is the co-founder and former co-director of the Los Angeles Institute for the Humanities at USC.

Ross is married to Linda L. Kent, an Emmy Award-nominated producer.
