= Ross W. Greene =

American psychologist

Ross W. Greene is an American clinical child psychologist. The author of several books on child behavior—including The Explosive Child, Lost at School, Lost & Found, and Raising Human Beings—Greene originated the evidence-based Collaborative & Proactive Solutions (CPS) model of intervention. He is the founding director of the non-profit Lives in the Balance, and developed and executive produced the documentary film, The Kids We Lose. Greene's research has been extensively published in academic journals and he and the CPS model have been mentioned in popular media. He advocates against punitive, exclusionary disciplinary practices, including detention, suspension, expulsion, corporal punishment, restraint, and seclusion.

== Education ==
Greene received his undergraduate degree at the University of Florida and his Ph.D. in clinical psychology at Virginia Tech in 1989. He completed his pre-doctoral internship at Children's National Medical Center in Washington, D.C. His academic appointments include the Department of Psychology at Virginia Tech (1989-1991, 2012 to present), the Faculty of Science at the University of Technology Sydney, Australia (2016 to present); the Department of Psychiatry at Harvard Medical School (1992 to 2013), the Departments of Psychiatry and Pediatrics at University of Massachusetts Medical Center (1991-1992); and the Department of Education at Tufts University (2010 to 2013).

== Career ==
Greene's books The Explosive Child and Lost at School focus on children and adolescents who are compromised in the realms of flexibility, frustration tolerance, emotion regulation, and problem solving, resulting in frequent and sometimes severe temper outbursts and noncompliance. In his books, Greene outlines a treatment model called "Collaborative & Proactive Solutions" for helping such youth in families, schools, and therapeutic facilities. The term "explosive" is partially captured in the diagnosis of Intermittent explosive disorder in the Diagnostic and Statistical Manual of Mental Disorders (DSM). Children identified as being explosive may meet diagnostic criteria for a variety of additional neurological conditions and/or psychiatric disorders, including bipolar disorder, attention-deficit hyperactivity disorder, oppositional defiant disorder, Tourette syndrome, autism spectrum disorder, disruptive mood dysregulation disorder, or obsessive compulsive disorder.

Though he originated and originally called his model "Collaborative Problem Solving," he is not affiliated with those now marketing that product and does not endorse what they have done with his work.

== Works ==
- Greene, Ross W. The Explosive Child: A New Approach for Understanding and Parenting Easily Frustrated, "chronically Inflexible" Children. New York: HarperCollins, 1998, 2014.
- Greene, Ross W. Lost at School: Why Our Kids with Behavioral Challenges Are Falling Through the Cracks and How We Can Help Them. New York: Scribner, 2008, 2014.
- Greene, Ross W. Lost and Found: Helping Behaviorally Challenging Students (and, While You're at it, All the Others). San Francisco: Jossey-Bass, 2016.
- Greene, Ross W. Raising Human Beings: Creating a Collaborative Partnership with Your Child. New York: Scribner, 2016.
- Greene, Ross W. The Kids Who Aren't Okay: The Urgent Case for Reimagining Support, Belonging, and Hope in Schools. New York: Scribner, 2026.
