= Liz Ross =

Australian activist

Liz Ross is a long-term socialist activist and author based in Melbourne, Australia. She has campaigned for Women's Rights and Gay Liberation since 1972 and was a union delegate in the Department of Social Security for ten years during the Hawke era. Notably, she has contributed detailed accounts of industrial struggle in Australia, with militant workers in both defunct the Builders Labourers Federation and the Royal Australian Nurses' Federation. She is also a member of the Trotskyist organisation Socialist Alternative, as well as its electoral alliance party Victorian Socialists and a founding and life member of the Australian Lesbian and Gay Archives.

== Writing ==
In 2013, Ross wrote Revolution is for us: The Left and Gay Liberation in Australia, published by Interventions, which refutes claims that Marxism has no tradition of dealing with sexual oppression. Victorian Equal Love Convenor and fellow member of Socialist Alternative, Ali Hogg said of the book: "Ross's provocative book challenges conventional views about the origins of modern Lesbian and Gay movements. Her insights are sure to spark debate among fighters for equal rights and liberation."

In 2004, Ross wrote Dare to struggle, dare to win! Builders Labourers fight deregistration, 1981-94, published by Vulgar Press, which outlined the history of the militant Builders Labourers Federation. David Renton of Labour History called the book "a wonderfully partisan account that takes seriously the challenge of understanding the past through the eyes of the people who realised that strong trade unions of unskilled workers are a rare and precious thing, the men and (very often) women who fought against the bosses and the courts."

== Selected books ==
- Revolution is for us: The Left and Gay Liberation in Australia, Interventions, Melbourne, 2013.
- Rebel Women in Australian Working Class History, (With Sandra Bloodworth, Janey Stone, Tom O'Lincoln, Diane Fieldes. Edited by Bloodworth and O'Lincoln), Red Rag, Melbourne, 2008.
- How capitalism is costing us the earth, Socialist Alternative, Melbourne, 2008.
- Dare to struggle, dare to win! Builders Labourers fight deregistration, 1981–94, Vulgar Press, 2004.

== Selected articles ==
- It was a riot! 30 years since Australia's first Mardi Gras, Socialist Alternative, Edition 125, February 2008.
- Why capitalism is not the answer, ON LINE Opinion, 2008.
- Building Unions and Government Reform: the Challenge for Unions, Journal of Australian Political Economy, 2005.
- Gay Liberation: Pink triangles, red banners, Australian Gay Left, (Originally appeared in Socialist Action no 13, October 1986).
