= Cargenbridge =

Village in Dumfries and Galloway, Scotland

Coordinates: 55.0563°N 3.6405°W

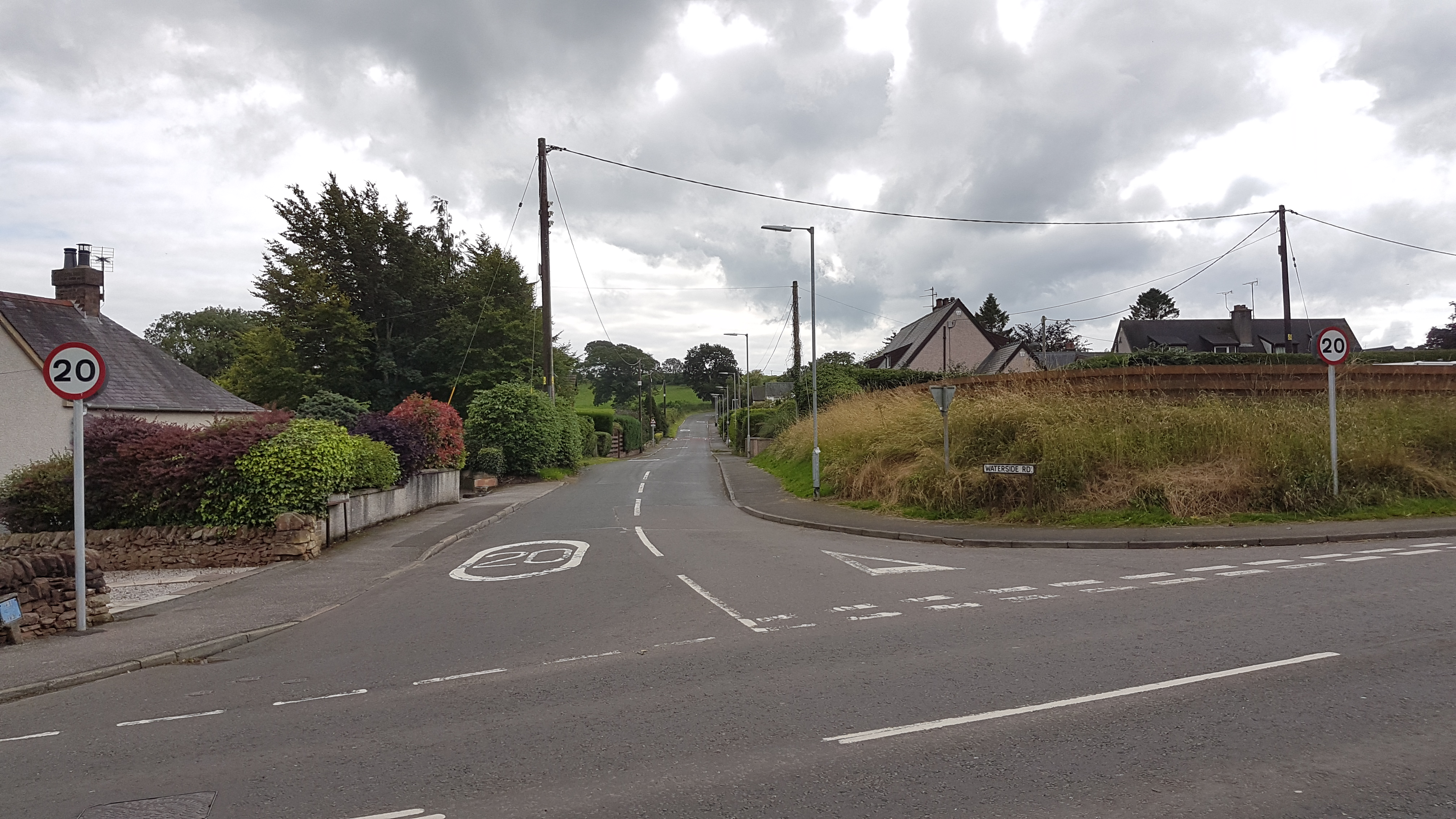

- Location within Dumfries and Galloway
- Population: 570 (2020)
- Civil parish: Troqueer
- Council area: Dumfries and Galloway
- Lieutenancy area: Kirkcudbrightshire
- Country: Scotland
- Sovereign state: United Kingdom
- Postcode district: DG2
- Police: Scotland
- Fire: Scottish
- Ambulance: Scottish

Cargenbridge is a village located in Dumfries and Galloway, United Kingdom, southwest of Dumfries. It is in Troqueer parish, in the historic county of Kirkcudbrightshire.

== Etymology ==
Cargenbridge takes its name from a bridge over the Cargen Water. The name dates back to at least 1753, when 'Cargen bridge croft' is recorded in the Kirkcudbrightshire land tax roll. Cargen itself has a number of possible Cumbric etymologies. It may be a compound formed from cajr 'enclosed, defensible site' and one of the following elements, which likely refer to an earlier name for Cargen Water:

- gein[d] (from earlier can[d]) 'white; bright, clear'
- geint (from earlier cant) 'a corner, an oblique angle; boundary'
- gę:n (from earlier cẹin) 'fresh'.
- gejn (from earlier ceμ-) 'ridge'

Alternatively, it may be from the root carreg 'a rock, a rocky place' + the suffix -an. It may also be Gaelic carraigín 'little rock'.

== History ==
Cargenbridge is referred to as a 'village' in 1848 in the entry for 'Cargen Bridge Smithy' in the Ordnance Survey Name Book. In 1962, it is recorded that the population quadrupled following the building of 36 new local authority houses.

Despite being close to Dumfries, Cargenbridge remained in Kirkcudbrightshire when part of Troqueer parish was taken into Dumfriesshire as part of the amalgamation of the burghs of Dumfries and Maxwelltown. The extension of the boundaries of the county of Dumfriesshire over the River Nith did not extend as far as Cargenbridge.

Curriestanes cursus, a large Neolithic monument now only visible as a crop mark, sits just above the village. It is, along with Pict's Knowe, one of two scheduled monuments in Troqueer parish.

== Education ==
The earliest school in the vicinity of Cargenbridge was Doweel school, which opened at the beginning of the eighteenth century. The Rev. William Somervell (died 1698), minister of Troqueer parish, left money to found the school. This became Drumsleet, a two-teacher school. Both Drumsleet and the single-teacher Whinnyhill school were made redundant in 1959 when Cargenbridge secondary and primary school opened. The building, described in 1962 as a "very modern school", was opened in October by the Earl of Galloway. It was designed by Eric W. Hall. The former Drumsleet school became a community centre. In 1962 the primary school had three teachers and 80 pupils and the secondary school had 14 teachers and 144 pupils. The secondary school was closed between September 1982 and September 1984. The current Cargenbridge Primary School building was opened in 2009.
