= John Blackadder =

John Blackadder or Blackader may refer to:

- John Blackadder (preacher) (c. 1622–1685), Scottish Covenanter
- John Blackadder (soldier) (1664–1729), Scottish soldier, son of the preacher
- Sir John Blackadder, 1st Baronet (1626–c. 1670), of the Blackadder baronets
