= Andrew Crichton =

Scottish biographer and historian

Andrew Crichton (1790–1855) was a Scottish biographer and historian.

Crichton, youngest son of a small landed proprietor, was born in the parish of Kirkmahoe, Dumfriesshire, December 1790, and educated at Dumfries Academy and at the university of Edinburgh.

After becoming a licensed preacher he was for some time engaged in teaching in Edinburgh and North Berwick. In 1823 he published his first work, the Life of the Rev. John Blackadder, which was followed by the Life of Colonel J. Blackadder, 1824, and Memoirs of the Rev. Thomas Scott, 1825. To Constable's Miscellany he contributed five volumes, viz. Converts from Infidelity, 2 vols. 1827, and a translation of Christoph Wilhelm von Koch's Revolutions in Europe, 3 vols. 1828.

In the Edinburgh Cabinet Library he wrote the History of Arabia, 2 vols. 1833, and Scandinavia, Ancient and Modern (written with Henry Wheaton), 2 vols. 1838. He commenced his connection with the newspaper press in 1828 by editing (at first in conjunction with De Quincey) the Edinburgh Evening Post. In 1830 he conducted the North Briton, and in 1832 he undertook the editorship of the Edinburgh Advertiser, in which employment he continued till June 1851.

He contributed extensively to periodicals, among others to the Westminster Review, Tait's Edinburgh Magazine, the Dublin University Magazine, Fraser's Magazine, the Church Review, and the Church of Scotland Magazine and Review.

In 1837 the university of St. Andrews conferred on him the degree of Doctor of Laws. He was a member of the presbytery of Edinburgh, being ruling elder of the congregation of Trinity College Church, and sat in the general assembly of the Church of Scotland as elder for the burgh of Cullen for three years previous to his decease.

He died at 33 St. Bernard's Crescent, Edinburgh, 9 Jan. 1855.

He married first, in July 1835, Isabella Calvert, daughter of James Calvert, LL.D. of Montrose, she died in November 1837; and secondly, December 1844, Jane, daughter of the Rev. John Duguid, minister of Erie and Kendall.

He was a good friend of Leitch Ritchie, who was his neighbour at St Bernards Cresecent.
