= St Queran's Well =

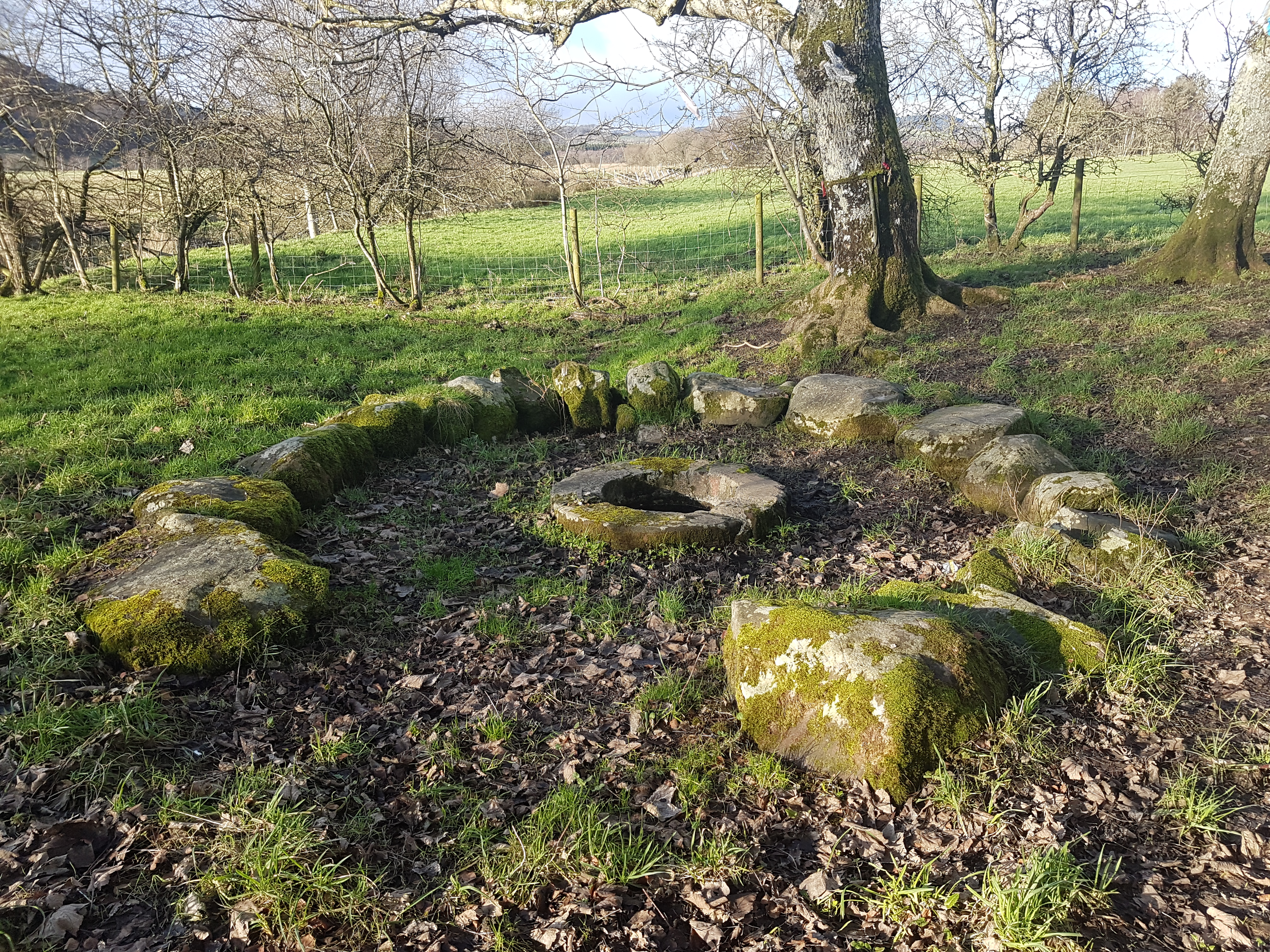

- Location within Dumfries and Galloway
- 55.033499°N 3.635132°W
- OS grid reference: NX 9559 7222

St Queran's Well is a holy well in Dumfries and Galloway, Scotland, located in the parish of Troqueer in the historic county of Kirkcudbrightshire. A spring feeds a 3 ft wide concrete pool surrounded by a ring of stones 10 ft in diameter. In 1892 it was reported that coins and pins were left in the well and ribbons tied to the surrounding bushes as offerings. The well was cleaned out in c. 1870 and hundreds of coins were found, the earliest of which dated back to 1560. Ribbons and other offerings are still left around the well today.

The well was recorded as St Jardan's well in 1847 in the Ordnance Survey Name Book. It was known as St Jargan's Well in the first half of the seventeenth century.
