= William Blackadder =

William Blackadder may refer to:

- William Blackadder (rugby union)
- William Blackadder (physician)
