= Blackadder baronets =

Extinct baronetcy in the Baronetage of Nova Scotia

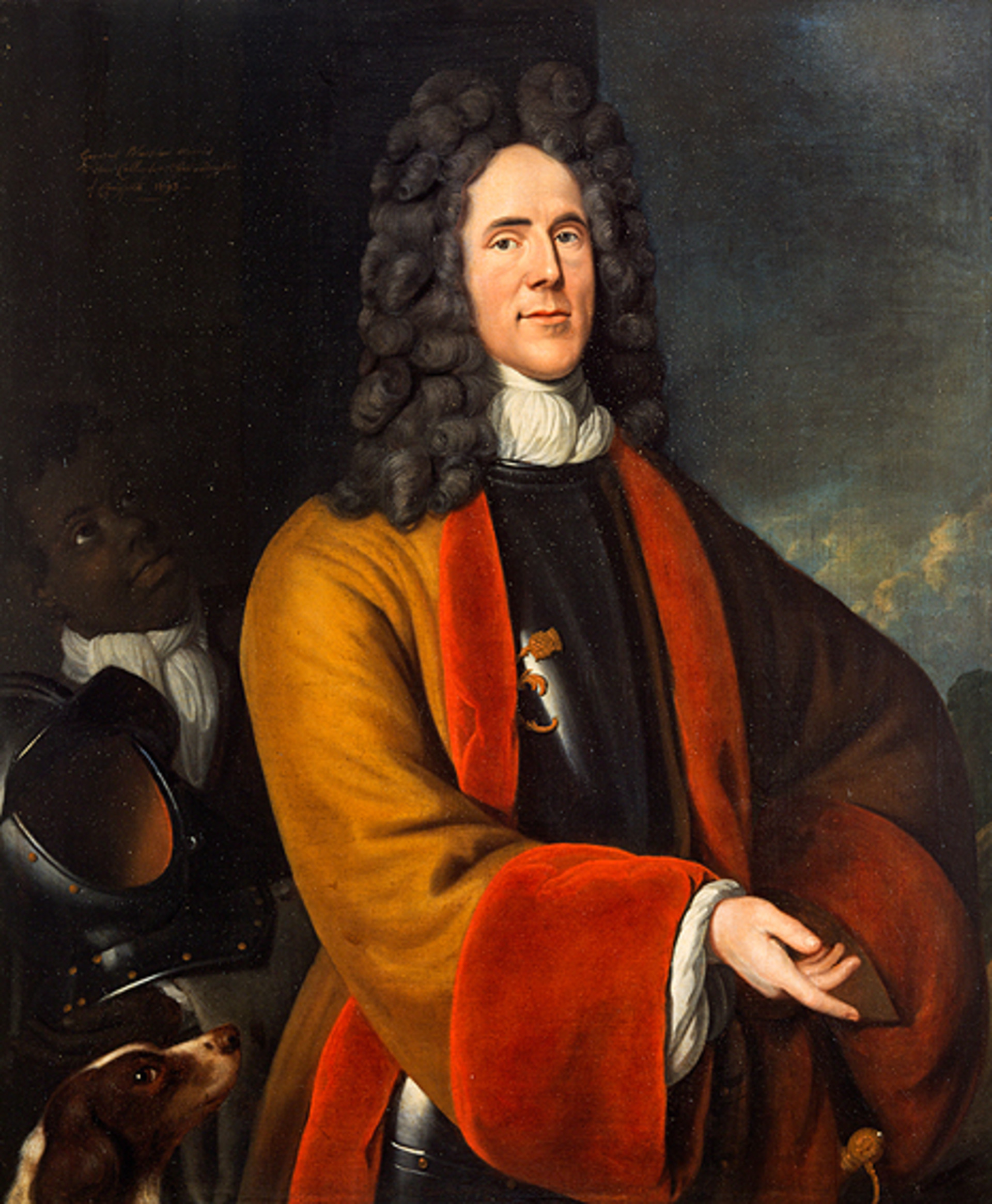
Colonel John Blackadder, grandson of the first Baronet.

The Blackadder Baronetcy, of Tulliallan in the County of Perth, was a title in the Baronetage of Nova Scotia. It was created on 28 July 1626 for John Blackadder. He was a profligate spender, and impoverished the estates and title, eventually moving to the continent and dying in America. He married Christian Graham, a daughter of John Graham, 6th Earl of Menteith and had issue, but owing to the bankruptcy of the honour it was never claimed and the title remained dormant after Sir John's death. The celebrated covenanting preacher John Blackadder was legally the heir, but did not claim the title. The preacher's son Colonel John Blackadder later became governor of Stirling Castle.

== Blackadder baronets, of Tulliallan (1626) ==
- Sir John Blackadder, 1st Baronet (1626 – c. 1670)

== See also ==
- Clan Blackadder
