= List of listed buildings in Troqueer, Dumfries and Galloway =

This is a list of listed buildings in the civil parish of Troqueer in Dumfries and Galloway, Scotland.

== List ==
Name	Location	Date Listed	Grid Ref. (Note: Sometimes known as OSGB36, the grid reference (where provided) is based on the British national grid reference system used by the Ordnance Survey. • "Guide to National Grid". Ordnance Survey. • "Get-a-map". Ordnance Survey.)	Geo-coordinates	Notes	LB Number (Note: Historic Environment Scotland assign a unique alphanumeric identifier to each designated site in Scotland, for listed buildings this always begins with "LB", for example "LB12345".)	Image
Terraughtie House				55°03′34″N 3°40′07″W	Category B	17171	Upload Photo
Dalskairth House Lodge And Gatepiers				55°02′32″N 3°39′52″W	Category B	17163	Upload Photo
Mabie House Mabie Lodge				55°01′12″N 3°37′59″W	Category B	17170	Upload Photo
Cargen House Red Lodge And Gatepiers (Formerly To Cargen House)				55°01′56″N 3°37′03″W	Category B	17185	Upload Photo
Cargen House Walled Garden And Pavilion				55°02′09″N 3°37′27″W	Category B	17186	Upload Photo
Goldielea House (Woodley Park)				55°02′41″N 3°40′27″W	Category C(S)	17199	Upload Photo
Dalskairth House Wellhead				55°02′21″N 3°39′50″W	Category B	17154	Upload Photo
Garroch Viaduct				55°03′34″N 3°38′58″W	Category B	17156	Upload Photo
Mabie House				55°01′14″N 3°38′41″W	Category B	17168	Upload Photo
Kirkconnel House				54°59′47″N 3°35′46″W	Category A	17204	Upload Photo
Castlehill House And Gatepiers On Main Road				55°03′36″N 3°40′50″W	Category B	17159	Upload Photo
Dalskairth House Cylindrical Structure Beside Main Drive				55°02′23″N 3°39′50″W	Category B	17162	Upload Photo
Dalskairth House Former Stables				55°02′31″N 3°39′54″W	Category B	17164	Upload Photo
Dalskairth House Sundial				55°02′24″N 3°39′53″W	Category B	17165	Upload Photo
Kirkconnel House Gatepiers				54°59′49″N 3°35′50″W	Category C(S)	17166	Upload Photo
Hillhead Farmhouse And Steading				55°02′06″N 3°40′32″W	Category B	17202	Upload Photo
Kirkconnel House Former Stables/Outbuildings				54°59′46″N 3°35′50″W	Category C(S)	17167	Upload Photo
Goldielea Stables				55°02′42″N 3°40′35″W	Category C(S)	17200	Upload Photo
Goldielea Viaduct				55°02′44″N 3°40′31″W	Category A	17201	Upload another image
Islesteps Bridge (A710 Over Cargen Pow)				55°02′23″N 3°37′13″W	Category C(S)	17203	Upload Photo
Dalskairth House				55°02′24″N 3°39′55″W	Category B	17161	Upload Photo
Mabie Former Stables (Forestry Commission)				55°01′13″N 3°38′38″W	Category B	17169	Upload Photo
Cargen House Cargen Grove (Formerly Cargen House Stables)				55°02′09″N 3°37′35″W	Category B	17187	Upload Photo
Cargen House Cargen Grove Gatepiers (On Roadside)				55°02′07″N 3°37′36″W	Category C(S)	17188	Upload Photo
Dalskairth House Lennox's Tower				55°02′14″N 3°40′21″W	Category C(S)	17155	Upload Photo

== Key ==
The scheme for classifying buildings in Scotland is:

- Category A: "buildings of national or international importance, either architectural or historic; or fine, little-altered examples of some particular period, style or building type."
- Category B: "buildings of regional or more than local importance; or major examples of some particular period, style or building type, which may have been altered."
- Category C: "buildings of local importance; lesser examples of any period, style, or building type, as originally constructed or moderately altered; and simple traditional buildings which group well with other listed buildings."

In March 2016 there were 47,288 listed buildings in Scotland. Of these, 8% were Category A, and 50% were Category B, with the remaining 42% being Category C.
