= Curriestanes cursus =

- Location within Dumfries and Galloway
- 55.060081°N 3.6299526°W

Scheduled monument
- Designated: 28 September 1993
- Reference no.: SM5738

Curriestanes cursus (grid reference NX 95990 75170) is a large neolithic ditched enclosure on the outskirts of Dumfries, in the parish of Troqueer, Dumfries and Galloway. It is visible only from aerial photography. It is, along with Pict's Knowe, one of two scheduled monuments in Troqueer parish.

== Description ==
Curriestanes is an earthwork cursus. While familiar from cursus sites in England, these types of monuments are less common than timber cursuses in Scotland. Less than fifteen monuments of this type have been found in Scotland and only five including Curriestanes have been excavated. Curriestanes is rare in having an entrance gap in one of its terminals, a feature known from only a handful of sites in the UK. The cursus is particularly wide at 100m, with a known area of at least three hectares. Only 3 other cursus monuments in Scotland are wider: East Linton, Brioch and Monktonhill. The ditches are irregular and do not appear to have been intended to be exactly straight which suggests that they may have been built in short segments. The ditches are wide, 7m, and shallow, no deeper than 0.6m.

== Context ==
Unlike England, where cursus monuments have been known and studied for hundreds of years, the study of cursus monuments is a recent phenomenon. Before 1976, when RCAHMS began its aerial photography programme, only one definite cursus site was known in Scotland: Gallaberry in Dumfries and Galloway. Over 50 Scottish sites have now been identified. These are found in two main geographical concentrations, in lowland Angus and Perthshire and another in Dumfries and Galloway, for the most part in and around the Nith valley. Curriestanes is one of twelve such monuments in Dumfries and Galloway.

200m to the south of the terminal of the monument, there is a ring-ditch, also only visible as a cropmark.
