= Robert Bennet of Chesters =

17th c. Scottish Presbyterian

Robert Bennet
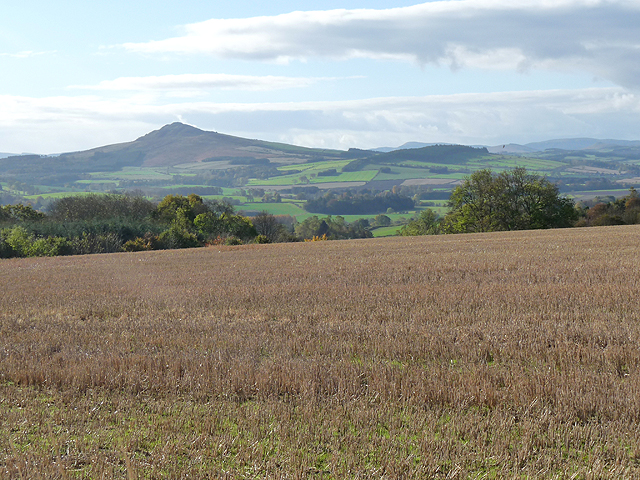
- Field of stubble above Chesters Glen

Religious life
- Religion: Christianity
- School: Presbyterianism

The sheriff of Roxburgh confronted by his sister at a Blackadder conventicle on Sunday 26 November 1676. Bennet was in the crowd and eventually dismissed them; they would not be dismissed by the soldiers.

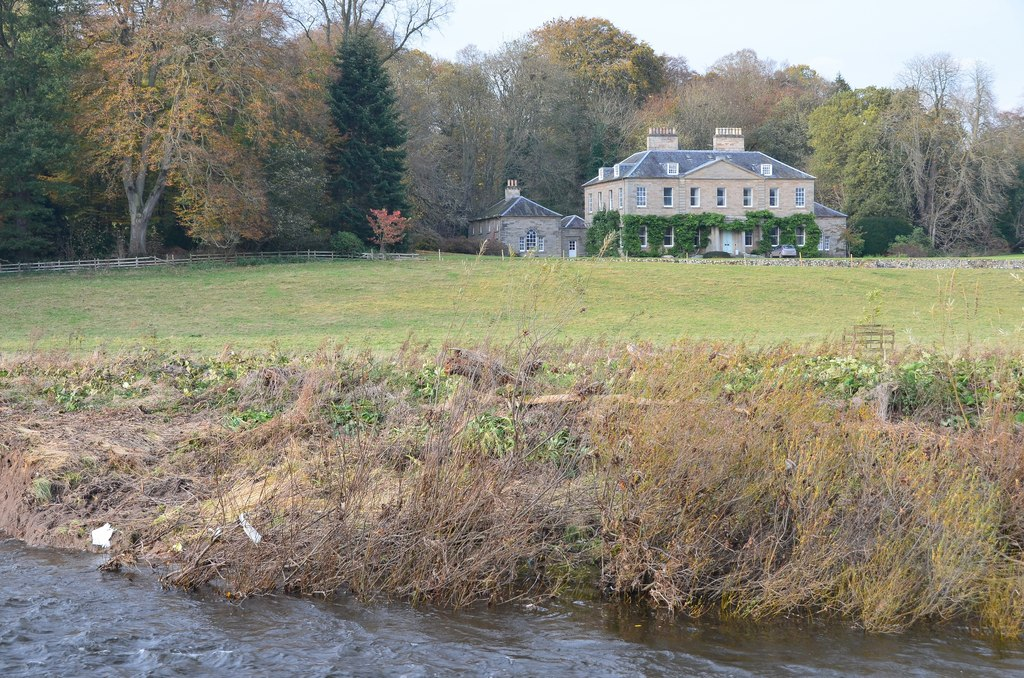
Chesters House

Robert Bennet of Chesters was a 17th-century Scottish gentleman. He lived in the Scottish Borders. Chesters or Grange lies on the banks of the Teviot and is close to the town of Ancrum in Roxburghshire.

== The conventicles of Lilliesleaf Moor ==
Lilliesleaf Moor, which then extended westward to Satchels and Grundistone, was the scene of many a conventicle. From Government papers we are warranted to infer that field-meetings were held for some time regularly nearly every Sabbath during summer and winter on Lilliesleaf and Hassendean moors, Blackriddel hill, and other places in the neighbourhood. Meldrum, the notorious Border persecutor, made the following statement before the Privy Council : — "The shire of Selkirk and the country there about is notoriously known to be the most disorderly part of the kingdom, and there have been always more conventicles there than in any other shire." The place in the neighbourhood of Selkirk where conventicles were most frequently held seems to have been Lilliesleaf Moor.

== Life ==
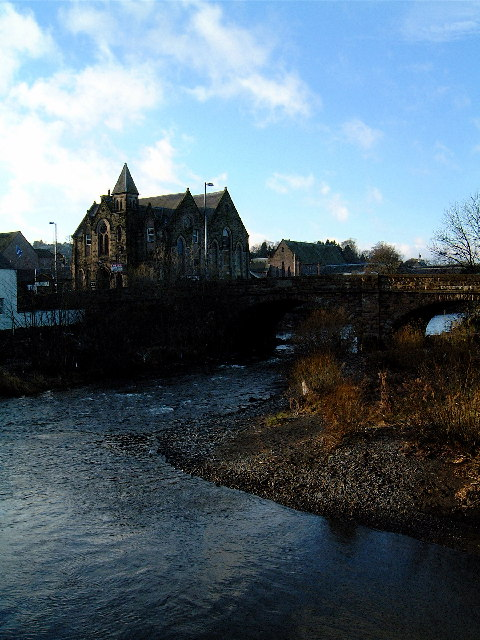
Wilton Church, Hawick

Robert Bennet became a religious man. His own minister was the famous John Livingstone of Ancrum. He in his own writings records how he was greatly affected following the preaching of Rutherford (possibly Samuel Rutherford) at a communion service, led by Livingstone, in Wilton church on Sunday 22 June 1656.

Afterwards Bennet, who was around 35 years old at the time, made a personal covenant with God:

"The Lord, who is rich in mercy to all that call on Him, by providence in my portion of Scripture that morning, did not leave me comfortless, but held forth the sweet promise of Isaiah chapter 55 verse 7, 'Let the wicked forsake his ways, and the unrighteous man his thoughts, and let him return unto the Lord, and he will have mercy upon him and to our God, for He will abundantly pardon.' Quhairunto as I could with heart and goodwill, I engaged, with my hands lifted up, to the Most High to forsake all my wicked ways; and, as He would enable, to devote myself to His feare; and solemlie vowes myself to be a Nazarite unto God; and earnestly beggs a heart to call Him my God and Father, and nocht depairt from His wayes, and mak me mindfull of my vowes, and enable me with strenth from above to perform the sam. So help me God. (Signed) ROBERT BENNET."

The Covenant thus made had a most powerful influence on Bennet's walk and conversation. He renewed it each year on 16 January as long as he lived. His wife's extravagance brought him into troublesome debt, but he faced all trials in a noble spirit.

In 1676, Robert Bennet of Chesters was declared an outlaw and had all his possessions seized due to the fact he had attended conventicles by John Blackadder and others. The conventicles took place on Lilliesleaf moor. He was known as a prisoner from the Bass Rock. He was heavily fined and repeatedly imprisoned on the island in the Firth of Forth for stating that he would not attend open air church services. The main reason behind his detention in the Bass was his taking part in "armed conventicles". He was sentenced on 2 May 1677 and transferred from the Tolbooth to the Bass by 3 horsemen and 6 footmen. He was fined 4000 merks on 28 June 1677. Other counts were preferred against him, such as refusing to wait upon the "preaching of the curates" and to forego the ministrations of one "John Welsh; a declared rebel and traitor". He was fined four thousand merks Scots, and ordained to be carried to the Bass until he made payment thereof. He was ordered to be set free on 9 October 1677.

== Family ==
He married Anna Douglas. He was given leave to visit her from the Bass when she was on her deathbed on 18 February 1678. He was ordered to be put into house arrest on 13 June 1678. Robert seems to have had a least one daughter: Christian who married Walter Scot. He also had a son named Archibald.
