= Broadlea henge =

Henge monument in southern Scotland

- Location within Dumfries and Galloway
- 55.060180°N 3.2235547°W

Scheduled monument
- Reference no.: SM666

Broadlea henge (grid reference NY 21946 74651) is a Neolithic or Bronze Age monument in the parish of Middlebie, Dumfries and Galloway. It is one of very few henge monuments in southern Scotland. The only other well preserved site is the considerably smaller Pict's Knowe near Dumfries. While Pict's Knowe is a single entrance, Class I henge, Broadlea has two entrances, making it a Class II henge. It measures 50m by 45m inside its ditch, which is as wide as 10m. The banks have been flattened over time but still rise in parts to around four feet high.

The henge overlooks the Mein Water valley; the Roman fort of Birrens is located on the opposite side of the valley. The aerial photographs which identified the henge also identified a Roman marching camp, whose ditch passes through the north-west entrance of the henge and out through the south-east entrance.

The monument is scheduled as "Birrens to Broadlee, Roman forts & camps & henge".
