= John Blackadder (preacher) =

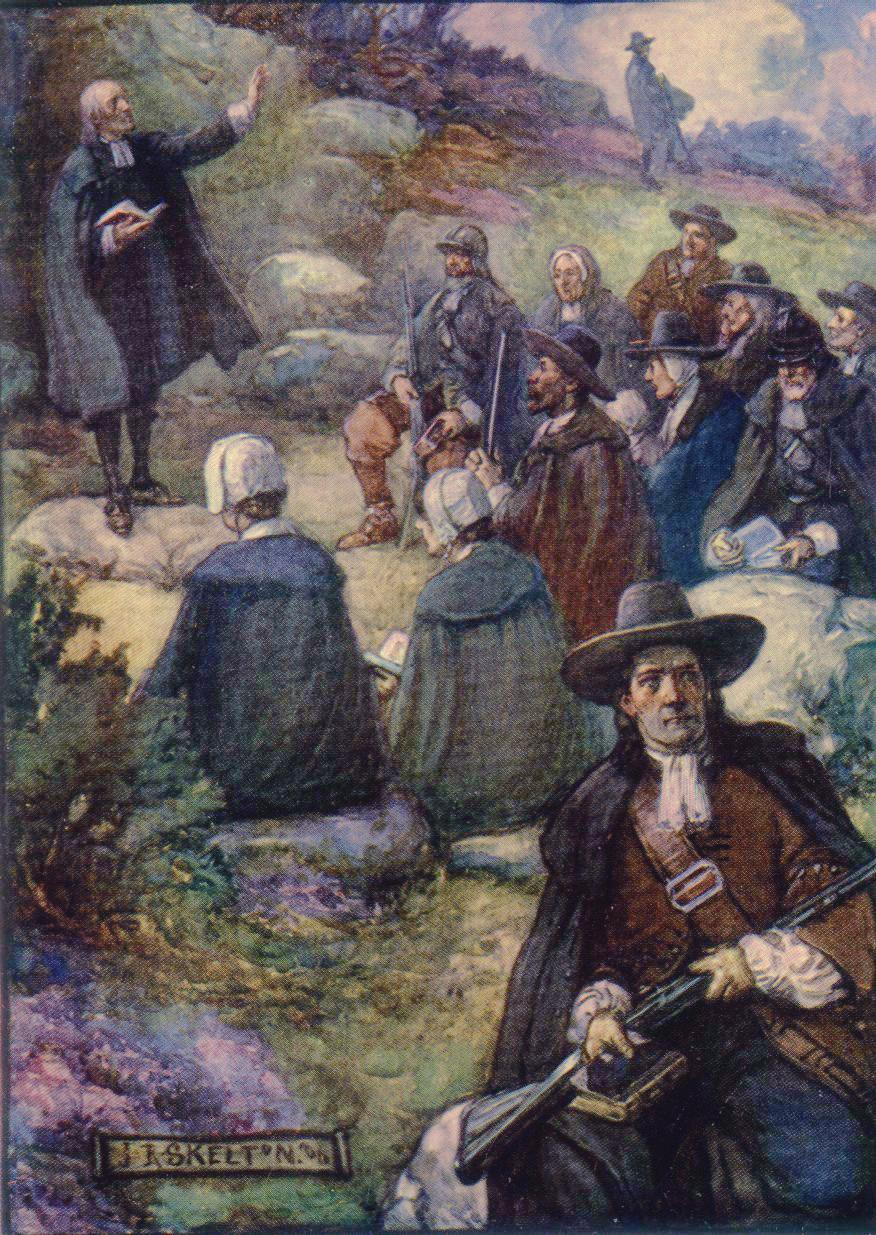
- Depiction of a conventicle in progress, from H. E. Marshall's Scotland's Story 1906
- Title: Mr. (he was a graduate)

Personal life
- Born: 1615
- Died: 1685 (aged 69–70) Bass Rock
- Resting place: North Berwick

Religious life
- Religion: Christianity
- School: Presbyterianism
- Profession: Preacher

John Blackadder (or Blackader) (1615–1685) was an eminent Presbyterian Covenanter preacher in Scotland during the period of the Commonwealth of England (1649–1660). Of the times MacPherson said that "after the first rejoicings of the Restoration were over, the Covenanters — Resolutioners as well as Protesters — were speedily disillusioned, and it became evident that the aim of Charles II and the junta of self-seeking noblemen who were in control of the affairs of Scotland was to establish in Scotland something approximating to an oriental despotism. The Presbyterian system, in which an Assembly of ministers and elders controlled the affairs of the Kirk, had to be supplanted by an Episcopal, with a hierarchy controlled by the Crown and easily manipulated in the interests of tyrannical rule." Despite a government ban he continued to preach in the fields. He was arrested and imprisoned in 1681 and died in jail on the Bass Rock.

== Early career ==
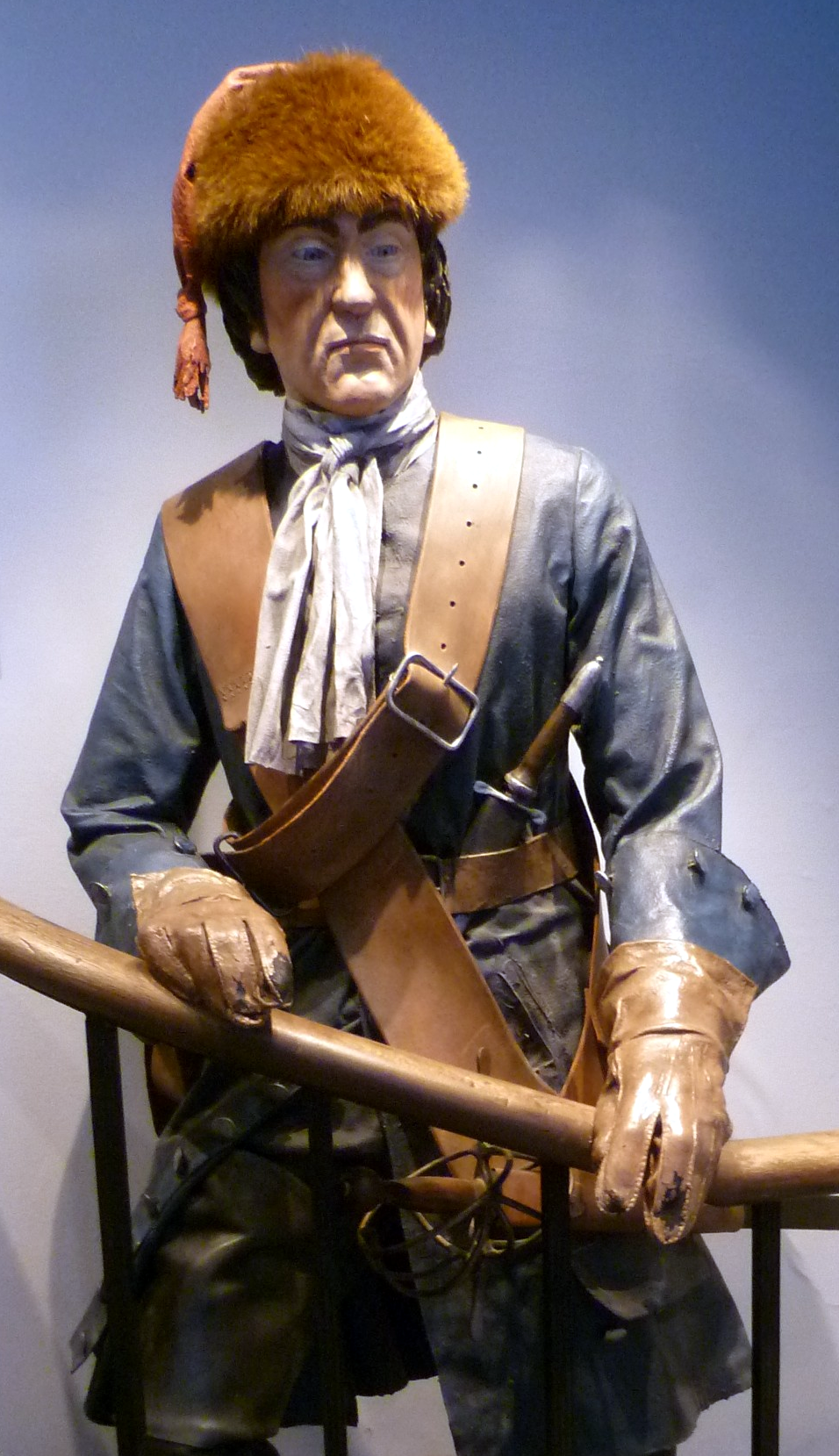
17th century government dragoon

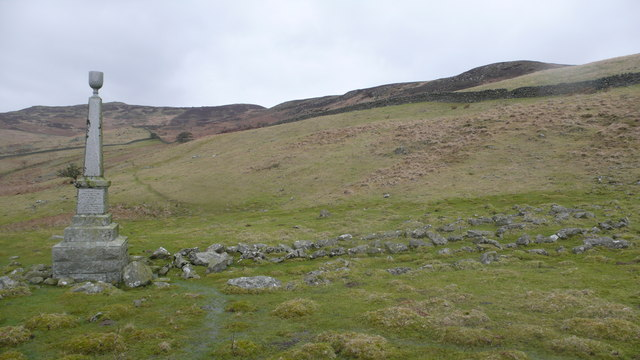
Covenanters' Communion Monument and stones- Skeoch Hill

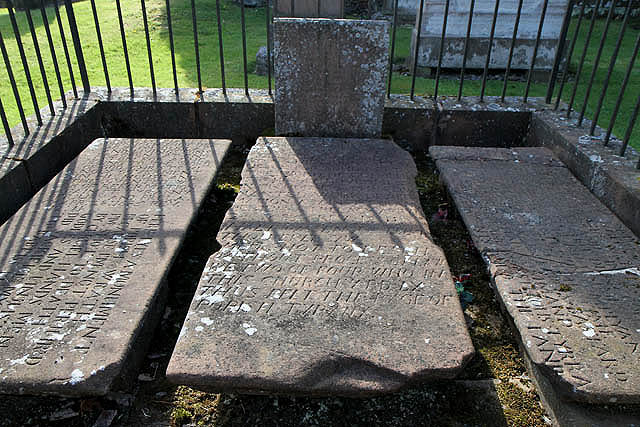
Covenanters' gravestones at Glencairn where Blackadder lived with his family

Blackadder was born between 1615 and 1623. (Note: There is uncertainty about Blackadder's birthdate. Stuart (1883) says Blackadder was born in 1622. Anderson (1877) gives 1615. The Dictionary of National Biography (1886) also gives 1615, but notes that another source gives 1623.) He was grandson of Adam Blackadder of Blairhall, a cadet of the Blackadder Baronetcy of Tulliallan, and became heir to the title after the extinction of the male issue of Sir John Blackadder of Tullialan, the first baronet. However, he did not assume the title. Blackadder studied divinity at Glasgow University, where his mother's brother, John Strang, was principal. In 1646 Blackadder married Janet Haining of Dumfries and they had five sons and two daughters. He graduated as a Master of Arts in 1650 and was subsequently licensed, probably by the Presbytery of Glasgow.

On 7 June 1653 Blackadder was ordained by the Presbytery of Dumfries as minister of Troqueer, near Dumfries, during the time of the Commonwealth, when the monarchy was deposed. The minister in the neighbouring parish was John Welsh of Irongray. Blackadder then began an intensive campaign for moral and spiritual reform. Besides holding a second service on Sundays, he instituted weekly services every Tuesday, "except in the throng of seedtime and harvest." These Tuesday meetings became so popular that people came from other parishes to attend them. He ordered all who could read to procure copies of the Scriptures, and those who were too poor to comply were provided with money to buy Bibles, catechisms, and similar books. Those who could not read were told to hear the sacred book read in neighbouring houses. Every half-year he catechised the entire parish; he visited many homes. He instituted societies, meetings for “family prayer and Christian fellowship"; and he announced that for all those who were specially anxious as to their moral and spiritual condition he would set apart a day, every fortnight, for communion and conference about their spiritual case. The reforming movement met with considerable success. The improved state of the parish was reflected in the attendances at public worship, for so many commenced to come that there was not seating accommodation for all.

Blackadder was expelled from his parish in 1662 after the restoration of Charles II because he refused to comply with the Episcopacy, which the government had imposed in Scotland. Blackadder, in his sermons on several Sundays, energetically exposed its unlawfulness, and, to use his own phrase, "entered his dissent in heaven" against it. In consequence of this, and the refusal of the presbytery of Dumfries to celebrate, by order of parliament, the anniversary of the Restoration, a troop of fifty horse were sent from Edinburgh to his home parish. He was prepared for a visit from the military; in fact, he ordered the gallery to be kept open for "the gentlemen of the guard," who made their appearance according to his expectation. He then preached from Hosea ix. 10-12. In the course of his sermon, he stated that he would not allow his freedom of speech to be interfered with by the presence of such unusual hearers, and he took up the same uncompromising attitude in the afternoon. The whole atmosphere was electric; many expected that he would be arrested, instead of which "the gentlemen of the guard courteously saluted the minister." He had almost persuaded them that he was right, for some of them observed "that he spake nothing he had not backed with Scripture."

Next day, however, an order was issued to all ministers within the bounds to appear before the commander and accompany him as prisoners to Edinburgh. The authorities at this stage were evidently not prepared to go to extreme lengths, for on the Friday the ministers were asked if they would agree to preach annually on 29 May. All of them were willing to agree to this, except Blackadder and his co-presbyter, Archibald. These two stood firm. On the following Tuesday, they were asked if they had yet "clearness of conscience," and their reply was that no severity would change their opinions. Naturally, they expected severe treatment; and they were both surprised when they were dismissed without further questions and told that they were at liberty to return to their parishes.

He was deprived by the Acts of Parliament on 11 June 1662, and Decreet of the Privy Council on 1 October 1662. The Privy Council, went to Glasgow and held the memorable meeting which earned for them the title of "the Drunken Council." With every member but one "flustered with drink," the Council proceeded to enact that all ministers who had not received Episcopal reordination were commanded to remove, along with their families, by 1 November, beyond the bounds of the Presbytery, otherwise they would be expelled by the military. This was the Act which drove Blackadder from Troqueer.

== Fugitive preacher ==
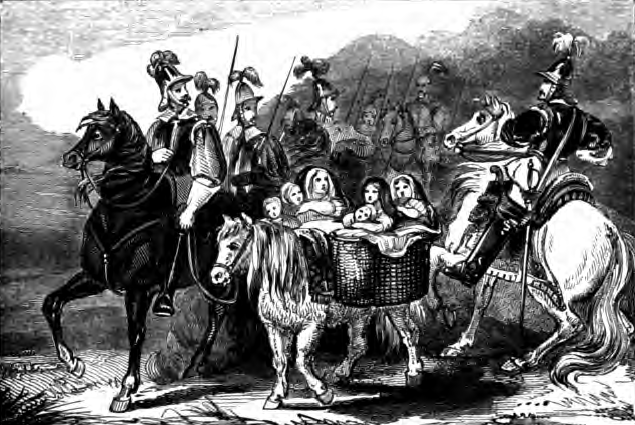
Blackadder's children ejected from the manse

Sheriff confronted by his sister at a Blackadder conventicle on Lilliesleaf moor. Robert Bennet of Chesters was in the crowd.

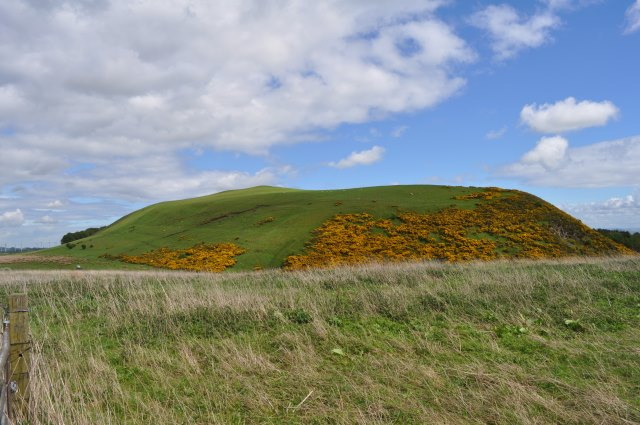
Hill of Beath site of a large armed conventicle by Blackadder and Dickson in June 1670.

Map of Rotterdam by Frederick de Wit (1690) where Blackadder fled in 1678. Blackadder was the grand nephew of Timothy Pont.

During the first three months of the year in which he came to Glencairn, he did not preach publicly, though he did so privately in his own house, to many of the neighbours who assembled. But after that he preached publicly at his own house, sometimes twice, sometimes thrice on the Sabbath, to great multitudes who flocked to hear him, not only from that parish, which was the largest in that part of the country, but out of eight or nine surrounding parishes in Nithsdale and Galloway.

He lived for a time at Caitloch, Ingleston, and Bardennoch, all in Glencairn, and at other places, and up to 1678 preached repeatedly at conventicles in the fields and in private houses. Numerous warrants were issued for his arrest, but he contrived to escape imprisonment. When the authorities heard about his activities, he moved again, and began a wandering life. On 25 January 1666 letters of Council were directed against Blackadder and other ministers who were preaching, praying and baptizing without authority.

Finding that his whereabouts in Glencairn were too well known, and being harassed by Turner's troopers, he decided to leave the South-west and settle for the time being in Edinburgh, of all places. He felt he was safer in a crowded city than in a remote country district. On the very night of his departure, Turner and a party of soldiers went to apprehend him, and finding him gone, made a great commotion at his house. The home was broken up, and the family dispersed all over the district.

Blackadder preached in Dumfriesshire and Galloway and in most other counties of southern Scotland, and was often joined in these conventicles by other preachers. He participated in meetings of the Covenanters at Hill of Beath in Fife and at East Nisbet in what is now Berwickshire. The meeting at Beath Hill on 18 June 1670 was one of the first where the attendees brought arms to protect themselves against the military, who had been ordered to enforce a court ban on conventicles. After exaggerated stories of this conventicle had spread, he was called to appear before the privy council, but instead went into hiding. He later resumed preaching.

On one occasion Blackadder preached at a conventicle on the crag beside Balcarres House in Fife. There was "a great confluence of people, and many of distinction". Blackadder took for his text "O that I knew where I might find Him" (Job 23:3). At the meeting, a notorious sinner was converted. Blackadder said that instances of the power and irresistible grace of God such as this rejoiced his heart, and did him more good than twenty years’ stipend. On another occasion Blackadder preached to a large crowd at Kinkell, near St Andrews. When Archbishop Sharp asked the provost to call out the militia to disperse the crowd, the provost said he could not do so, since the militia had joined the worshipers.

In 1674 Blackadder was made an outlaw, with a heavy reward for his capture, but continued to preach. In 1678 the Battle of Bothwell Bridge was fought between militant covenanters and government troops, in which the latter were victorious. Blackadder was not involved.

He fled to Rotterdam in 1678, and returned to Scotland by June 1679. He went again to Holland in May 1680, taking his eldest son, who was to study medicine. After placing his son at Leyden, and: visiting the Hague, Amsterdam, and some other cities, he returned to Rotterdam, where he remained for fifteen weeks preaching every Sabbath. Towards the end of September, he returned in a vessel belonging to Prestonpans, and arrived in Edinburgh on the same day that Mr John Dickson was sent to the Bass. During his stay at Rotterdam, Blackadder appears to have been very useful in allaying the animosities which prevailed among his banished countrymen resident in that city, among whom he found that the same divisions had taken place in consequence of the indulgence, as existed in Scotland. He is said, in particular, to have been instrumental in bringing about a better understanding between Robert M'Ward and Robert Fleming.

He returned to Scotland in September that year. By 1681 he resumed preaching, taking Edinburgh as his base and speaking at meetings in several neighboring parishes. Howie says his last public work, at a muir-side in the parish of Livingstone on 28 March 1681, he spoke on the text "That the nearer our delivery, our pains and showers would come thicker and sorer upon us" (Micah 4:9). Others say his last sermon was at Whitekirk hill which overlooks the Bass.

== Imprisonment and death ==
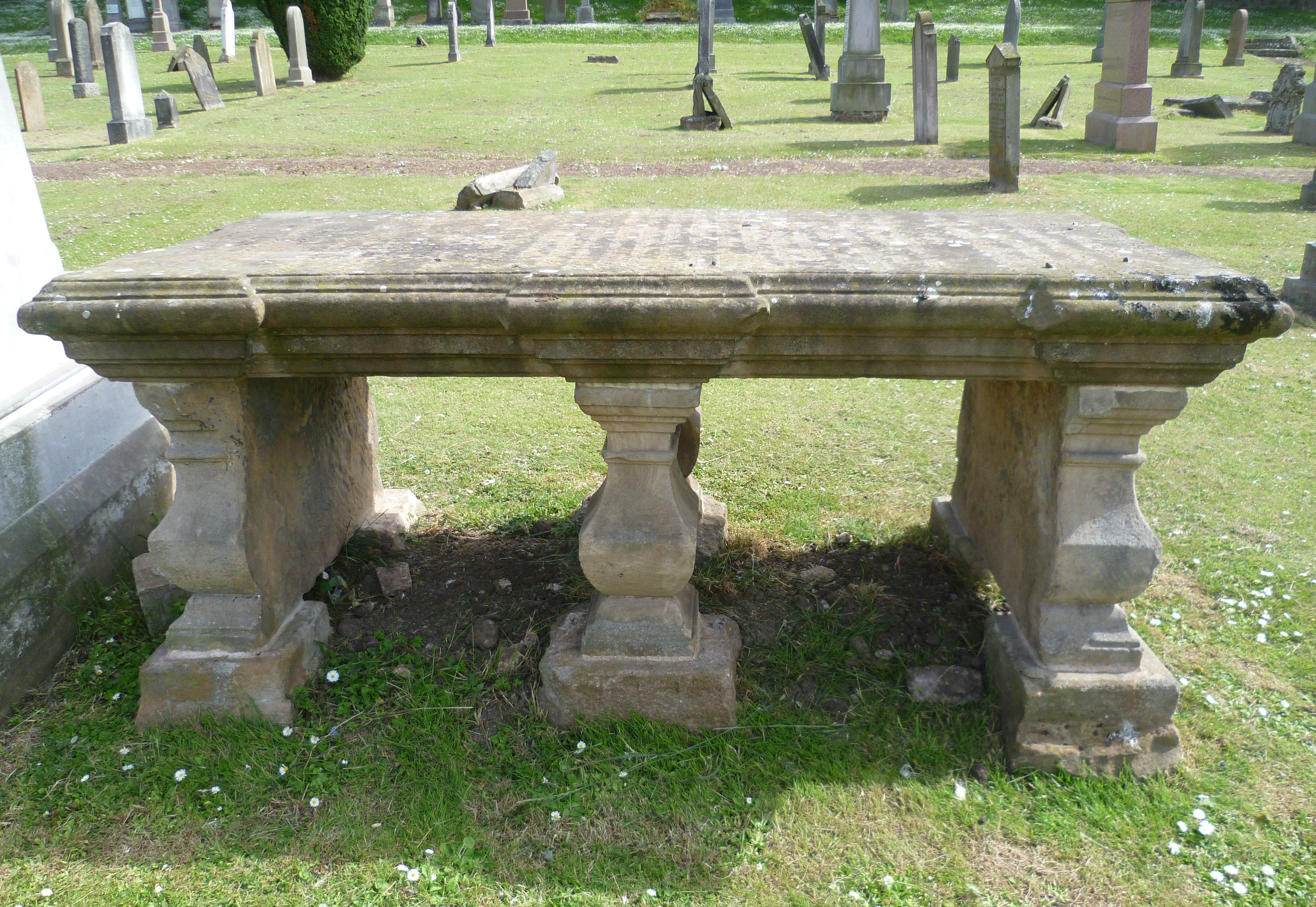
Blackadder's tombstone, in the Old Churchyard, North Berwick. It was restored in 2009.

On 6 April 1681 Blackadder was arrested in Edinburgh by Major Johnston. He was tried and found guilty, and imprisoned on the Bass Rock for four years. He was confined in a cell with three small iron-barred windows facing west. His health deteriorated due to the harsh conditions.

His health being much impaired by the dampness and closeness of his place of confinement, his friends applied to government for his liberation; but unwilling to grant him his release, it was at first proposed to remove him to the jail either of Haddington or Dunbar. At length he was offered his freedom, with permission to reside at Edinburgh, on condition of his granting a bond for five thousand merks. So much delay, however, took place, that, before he could regain his liberty, he sunk under the cruel hardships to which he was subjected, among which "hope deferred" was not one of the least. He died in the prison of the Bass in December 1685. He is buried in North Berwick churchyard

== Personal life ==
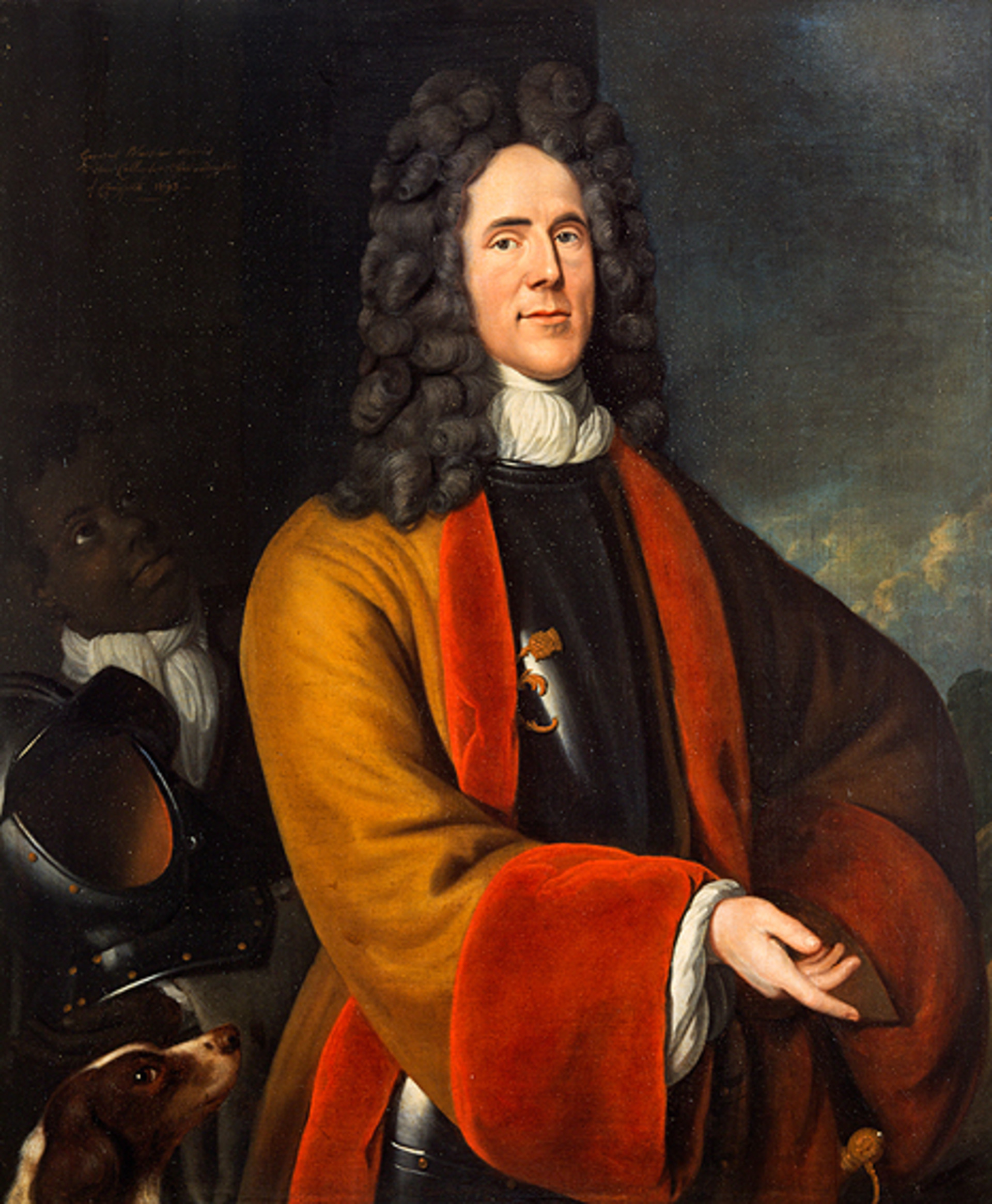
Lieutenant-Colonel John Blackadder, the 5th and youngest son of Blackadder

John Blackadder married in 1640, Janet (died 9 November 1688, and was buried in Greyfriars, Edinburgh, the following day), daughter of Homer Haining, merchant, Dumfries. Blackadder had five sons and two daughters. The first four sons were:

- William (1647–1704), the eldest son, who became physician to William III. William Blackadder, was born in 1659, and studied medicine. In 1665, he was sent to the University of Edinburgh. He was present at Bothwell Brig, and took an active part in that affair. He graduated at Leyden in Holland in 1680. In 1685 he returned to Scotland with the earl of Argyle in his unfortunate expedition, and was taken prisoner on his landing at Kirkwall in Orkney. After he had been more than a year in prison, a remission came down from London in his favour, and he was set at liberty, on which he proceeded to Holland, where he remained till 1688, some weeks before the prince of Orange came over. In the month of August that year, he and Colonel Cleland were sent to Scotland, to prepare the way for the Prince's landing in the subsequent November. Having imprudently ventured up to the castle of Edinburgh, to see one Captain Mackay, a patient of his, he was apprehended by the duke of Gordon, the governor of the castle. After being subjected to several examinations before a committee of the council, on rumours of the prince of Orange's invasion reaching Edinburgh, he was set at liberty, without being put to the torture, though it was frequently threatened. After the Revolution Dr. Blackadder was appointed physician to King William, and died, without issue, about the year 1701.
- Adam (born 1659), a merchant in Sweden and Edinburgh. The second son, Adam Blackadder, was bred to the mercantile profession in Stirling, and in the month of November 1674, while yet an apprentice, was, with several others, apprehended for not subscribing the black bond, as it was called, and for attending conventicles. His brother, Dr. Blackadder, presented a petition to the council, and after some time obtained his freedom. He was twice afterwards imprisoned, once in Fife, and another time in Blackness. The latter was for being at his father's preaching at Borrowstounness, where he baptized twenty-six children. He was afterwards a merchant in Sweden, where he resided for about nine years, and married a Swedish woman, whom he converted from Lutheranism to Calvinism, on account of which he was obliged to fly with her from her country, escaping with great difficulty, it being at that time death in Sweden for a native Swede to turn either Catholic or Calvinist. About the end of 1684 he returned to Scotland, and settled in Edinburgh. He wrote an account of his father's sufferings, which he transmitted to the historian Wodrow, and some political tracts concerning the Dairien expedition, and the state of parties in Scotland. The late Mr. John Blackadder, accountant-general of excise, was his grandson.
- Robert, who died in 1689 while a student of theology in Utrecht.
- Thomas, who emigrated and became a merchant in Maryland.
- His youngest son was Colonel John Blackadder (born 14 September 1664), later governor of Stirling Castle.
- His daughters were Elizabeth (married 25 October 1687, James Young, writer, Edinburgh). Having fallen into difficulties, he went to London, with a design to improve his circumstances. While there he wrote an excellent consolatory letter to his wife in Edinburgh, which has often been printed under the title of 'Faith Promoted, and Fears Prevented, from a proper view of affliction as God's rod.' Mrs. Young appears to have been a lady of remarkable piety and superior learning. She kept a diary or 'Short Account of the Lord's providence towards her,' which gives a summary of the memorable events of her life from 1700 until 1724.
- He had another daughter who died young in Glencairn.

== Legacy ==
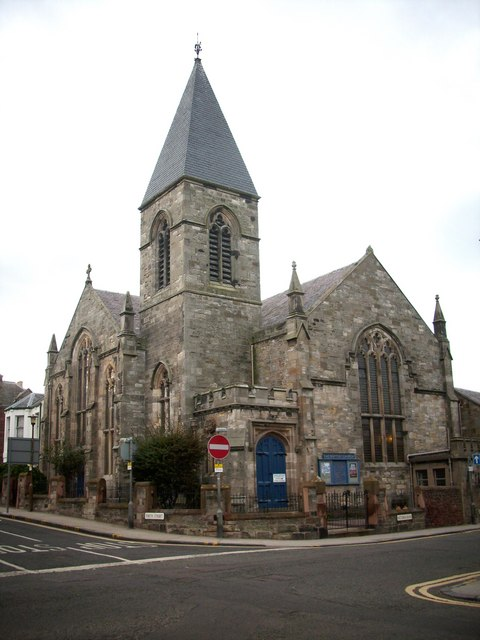
The original Blackadder Kirk, was at first a "church without the steeple". Since 1989 the building has been used by an independent Baptist church.

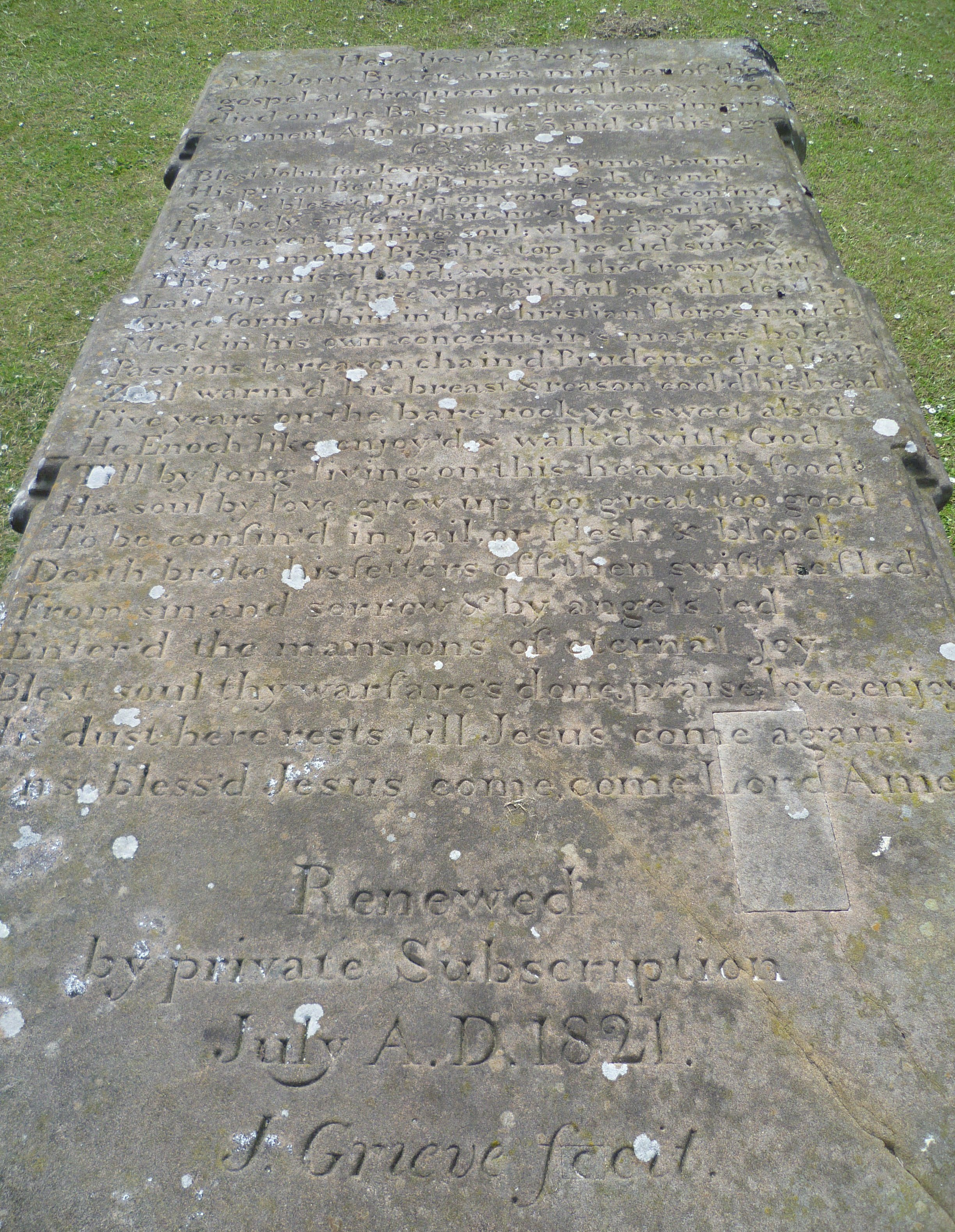
Blackadder's tombstone inscription (transcribed left)

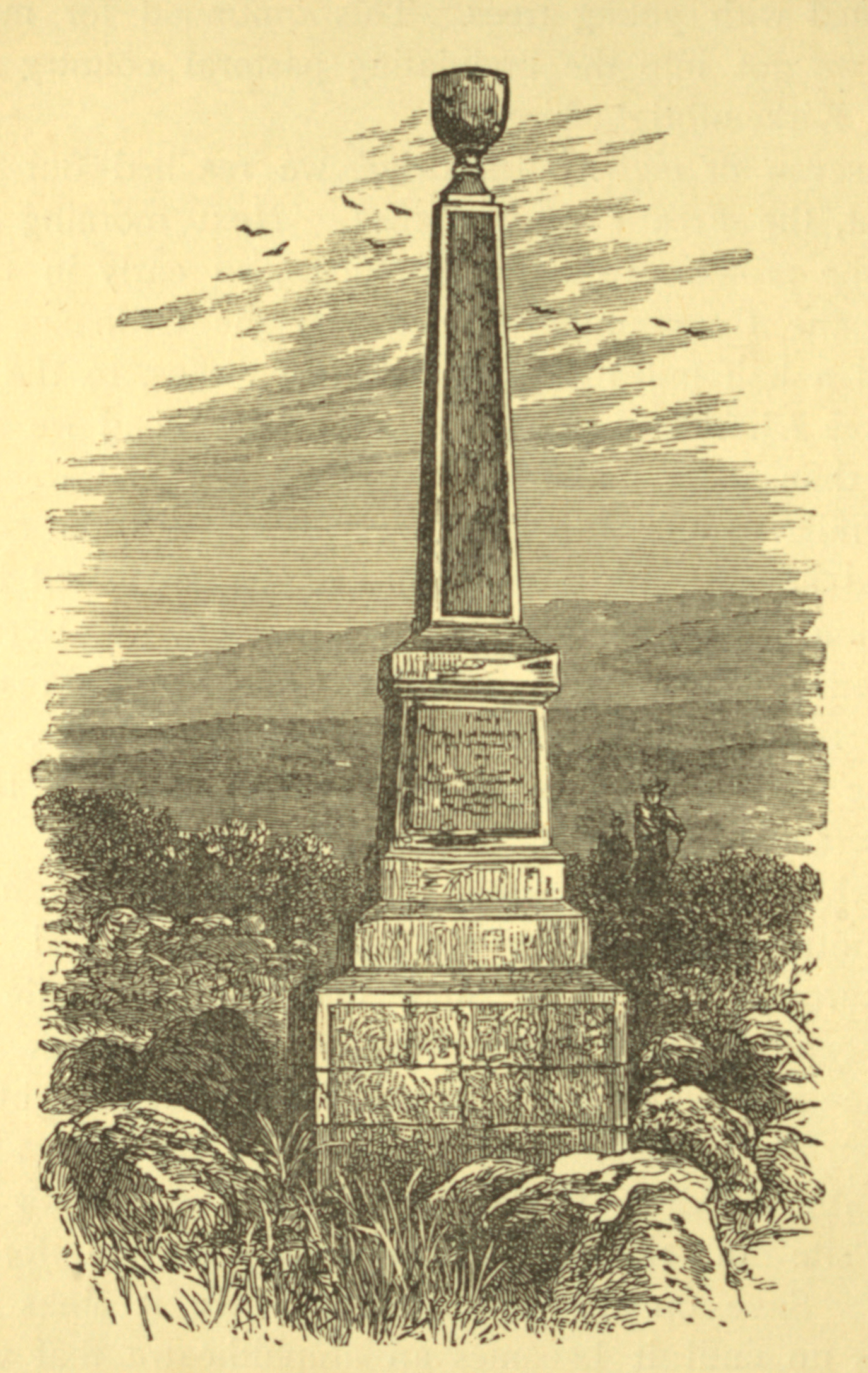
obelisk at Irongray

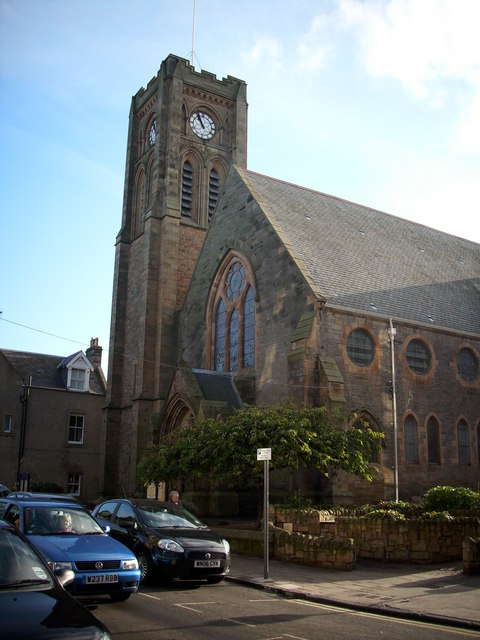
St Andrew Blackadder Church, North Berwick, named after John Blackadder

Andrew Crichton, author of the Life of Colonel Blackadder, compiled the Memoirs of the Rev. John Blackadder in 1826, mostly unpublished manuscripts written during his imprisonment.

John Blackadder is commemorated by the Blackadder kirk in North Berwick, originally a congregation of the Free Church of Scotland opened in 1845, following the Disruption of 1843. The Marine Hotel guide relates: "Soon after the Disruption of 1843, Mr James Crawford, W.S., at that time of the Rhodes, near North Berwick, conceived the idea of building a Free Church in North Berwick, in commemoration of the Martyrs of the Bass, because, as he believed, the principles for which the Martyrs suffered were the same as those for which the Free Church had seceded. This was the object set forth on the collecting cards circulated among his friends, which bore the picture of the Bass. And it was to raise funds for this purpose that he persuaded his friends M'Crie the Historian, Anderson the Martyrologist, Hugh Miller the Geologist, and Professors Fleming and Balfour to unite together in writing that most exhaustive and interesting of all books on the Bass: The Bass Rock." The congregation joined the United Free Church of Scotland in 1900 and became part of the Church of Scotland in 1929. The Church of Scotland congregation united with its sister congregation of St Andrew's in 1989, to form the congregation of St Andrew Blackadder.

There is a plaque in Troqueer his parish church.

The inscription on his tombstone in North Berwick reads: "Here lies the body of Mr John Blackadder, minister of the gospel at Troqueer, in Galloway, who died on the Bass, after five years' imprisonment. Anno Dom: 1685, and of his age 63 years.

Blest John, for Jesus' sake, in Patmos bound.
His prison Bethel, Patmos Pisgah found.
So the bless'd John, on yonder rock confined,
His body suffer'd, but no chains could bind
His heaven-aspiring soul; while day by day.
As from Mount Pisgah's top, he did survey
The promised land, and view'd the crown by faith,
Laid up for those who faithful are till death.
Grace formed him in the Christian Hero's mould
Meek in his own concerns in's Master's bold;
Passions to Reason chained, Prudence did lead
Zeal warmed his breast, and Reason cool'd his head.
Five years on the lone rock, yet sweet abode.
He Enoch-like enjoyed, and walk'd with God;
Till, by long living on this heavenly food,
His soul by love grew up too great, too good
To be confined to jail, or flesh and blood.
Death broke his fetters off, then swift he fled
From sin and sorrow, and by angels led,
Enter'd the mansions of eternal joy;
Blest soul, thy warfare's done, praise, love, enjoy.
His dust here rests, till Jesus come again,
Even so, blest Jesus, come come, Lord Amen.

== Bibliography ==
- Select Passages from the Diary and Letters of John Blackader (Edinburgh, 1806)
- Crichton's Memoirs of Rev. John Blackader (Edinburgh, 1823)
- Life and Diary of Lieut. -Colonel J. Blackader (1824)
- Edin. Guild Reg. (Bur.)
- Wodrow's Hist., iii., 266
- Tombstone
- Corrie's Annals of Glencairn
- Dictionary of National Biography
- Scott's Fasti, i. 604
- Anderson's Scottish Nation
- Min. Glasg. Univ. 111
- Edin. Guild and Reg. (Bass)
- Wodrow and Kirkton's Hist.
- Wodrow's Analecta;
- Edin. Christian Instructor, xxiii.
- New Statistical Acc. ii. iv. viii. &c.
- Crichton's Memoirs, 2nd ed. 1826, full and valuable
- Two Sermons on Isaiah liii. 11, in Howie of Lochgoin's Faithful Contendings, 1780, pp. 72–104
- Bishop Burnet's Life.
