= William Blackadder (physician) =

Scottish physician

- Born: 1647
- Died: 1704 (aged 56–57)
- Occupation: Physician

William Blackadder (1647–1704) was a Scottish physician. He was the physician to William III.

== Biography ==
Blackadder was the eldest son of the elder John Blackadder. He was born in 1647. He was sent to the University of Edinburgh in 1665, and he graduated in medicine at Leyden in 1680. Having in Holland made the acquaintance of some of the principal political refugees of England, he was frequently employed by them in important negotiations.

He accompanied the Earl of Argyll in his expedition to Scotland in 1685, and having, along with Spence, the earl's secretary, put ashore at Orkney to obtain information regarding the sentiments of the people, he was apprehended and sent for examination to Edinburgh. After landing at Leith he succeeded by signs in communicating to his sister, who had joined the crowd, the necessity to burn some papers amongst the luggage forwarded to his lodgings. A search therefore revealed nothing of a compromising character: but he was kept in prison for more than a year until, through a clever device of his brother, he obtained writing materials, and sent a letter to Fagel, the pensioner of Holland, who represented the case to the British envoy in such a way that King James ordered his liberation.

Blackadder went to Holland, whence, in 1688, he was sent to Edinburgh to carry on secret negotiations on behalf of the Prince of Orange. Having imprudently ventured into the castle, he was seized by order of the governor and committed for trial; but on the news of the landing of the Prince of Orange he was set at liberty. After the revolution he was, in reward of his services, appointed physician to King William. He died about 1704.
