= Pict's Knowe =

Prehistoric monument in Scotland

- Location within Dumfries and Galloway
- 55.032646°N 3.6383832°W

Scheduled monument
- Designated: 21 May 1928
- Reference no.: SM1092

Pict's Knowe (grid reference NX 9538 7213) is a henge monument in the parish of Troqueer, Dumfries and Galloway. It is one of a small group of henge monuments around Dumfries which includes Broadlea henge near Annan. Pict's Knowe is located 4 km SW of Dumfries on a small sandy bank in the peat covered valley of the Crooks Pow stream.

The site has been badly damaged by livestock, rabbit burrowing and tree rooting. The area around the monument had been occupied since the early Neolithic, but the henge itself appears to date to the early Bronze Age, based on radiocarbon analysis.

The monument has one entrance, making it a Class I henge. It enclosed an area of 20-25m in diameter. In the entrance to the henge, sherds of a carinated urn were found, and fragments of cremated bone, which may have been animal rather than human.

During the Iron Age the henge's bank was added to and the ditch recut, with a timber platform built over it.

The site was scheduled in 1928 as a prehistoric fort. Richard Bradley identified the monument as a henge in 1990. Although the site had been recognised as a henge some decades before, this information did not make its way into official records, and Pict's Knowe was classed as an 'earthwork' by the National Monuments Record of Scotland. The site was excavated by Julian Thomas between 1994 and 1998.
