= Troqueer =

Coordinates: 55.058266°N 3.606219°W

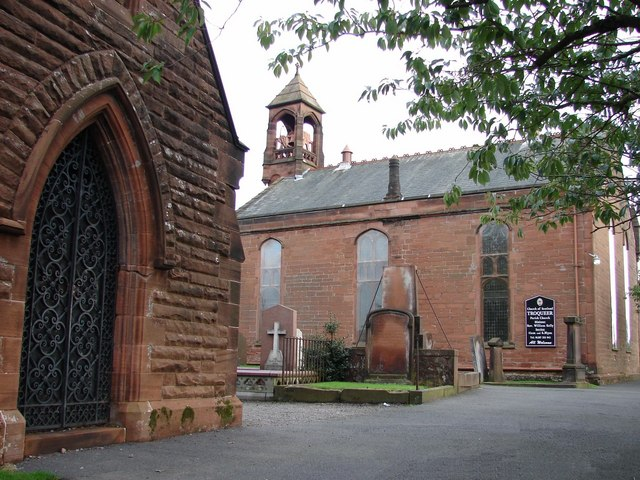
- Troqueer Parish Church

- Location within Dumfries and Galloway
- OS grid reference: NX976762
- Council area: Dumfries and Galloway
- Lieutenancy area: Dumfries
- Country: Scotland
- Sovereign state: United Kingdom
- Post town: DUMFRIES
- Postcode district: DG1/2
- Dialling code: 01387
- Police: Scotland
- Fire: Scottish
- Ambulance: Scottish
- UK Parliament: Dumfries and Galloway; Dumfriesshire, Clydesdale and Tweeddale
- Scottish Parliament: Dumfries; South Scotland

Troqueer is a former village and a parish in the historic county of Kirkcudbrightshire in Dumfries and Galloway on the west side of the River Nith. The eastern-side was merged with Dumfries to the east in 1929, and today eastern Troqueer is a suburb of Dumfries.

== Location ==
Troqueer lies on the west side of the Nith, and was originally in Kirkcudbrightshire. The parish has an area of 11,675 acres (4,725 ha) including the former burgh of Maxwelltown in the northeastern portion. It is about 7.5 miles (12.1 km) from north to south and 4.5 miles (7.2 km) from east to west, and is bordered on the east by the Nith.

An 1846 account said the parish included some woodland and plantations, but was mainly arable, meadow, and pasture. It went on: "The surface is intersected by three nearly equidistant and parallel ranges of heights, the first of which, rising gradually from the river, has been long in a high state of cultivation, and contains several nursery grounds and gardens of great fertility. The valley between it and the second ridge is also fruitful, and is watered by the Cargen, which flows into the Nith.

The second ridge, of greater elevation, produces excellent crops of turnips and potatoes, with wheat, barley, and oats; and the interval between it and the third ridge is partly good meadow land, but chiefly moss, which might at a moderate expense be brought into tillage. The third ridge, and the highest, extends through the whole length of the parish; it is arable on the acclivities nearly to the summit, and though less fertile than the others, yields remunerating crops.

The Nith, of which the water is beautifully limpid, abounds with salmon, grilse, and herlings, even beyond what is necessary for the supply of the surrounding district. The plantations consist of oak, ash, elm, and other foresttrees, with fir and larch; they are carefully managed, and in a flourishing condition".

== Etymology ==
The name Troqueer is of Cumbric origin. The first element is treβ 'farmstead'. The second is likely *wejr 'a bend, something curved or twisted', referring to the bend in the Nith, beneath Troqueer Motte. Andrew Breeze proposes the meaning ‘farmstead on the (river-)bend’.

== History ==
There are two scheduled monuments in the parish: Pict's Knowe and Curriestanes cursus.

In the 12th century Alan filius Roland, constable of Scotland, built an earthwork motte and bailey fortress, the Mote of Troqueer, against the banks of the Nith. In the early 13th century the fortress was held by Durand filius Christin. Part of the flat-topped motte survives, but some of the motte is now covered by the suburbs, and the position of the bailey has been lost.

John Blackadder, the eminent Covenanter, was ordained minister of the Troqueer parish on 7 June 1653 during the time of the Commonwealth. Blackadder was expelled from his parish in 1662 after the restoration of Charles II because he refused to comply with the Episcopacy, which the government had introduced in Scotland.

The community around the Troqueer parish church was made a separate burgh of Maxwelltown in 1810, with its own council and court. In 1846 the parish containing 4,351 inhabitants, of whom 3,230 were in the burgh. As of 1887 the parish had a population of 5,524. During the 19th century Maxwelltown grew steadily as it acquired tanneries, a brewery, iron foundries, weaving shops, a brick and tile works, saw mills and the Troqueer and Rosefield Mills.

The burgh of Maxwelltown was absorbed into the burgh of Dumfries on 3 October 1929, which had the effect of transferring the part of Troqueer parish within the burgh to Dumfriesshire, whilst the more rural part of the parish outside the burgh stayed in Kirkcudbrightshire. The parish then straddled the two counties until further local government reform in 1975 abolished the administrative counties, and both parts of the parish became part of the Nithsdale district in the Dumfries and Galloway region. The whole parish has therefore been included in the Dumfries lieutenancy area since 1975.

== Today ==
Troqueer has a primary school with 253 pupils as of 2024. The present building has ten classrooms. It was built at a cost of £5.1 million, and opened in October 2009. The Troqueer Community Centre is home to the Over 50's Club. It is used for bingo, events and parties. The centre provides a base for various community activities. The Troqueer Parish Church overlooks the River Nith. The church is home to a number of community groups who meet there weekly.

== List of listed buildings ==
List of listed buildings in Troqueer, Dumfries and Galloway

== Gallery ==
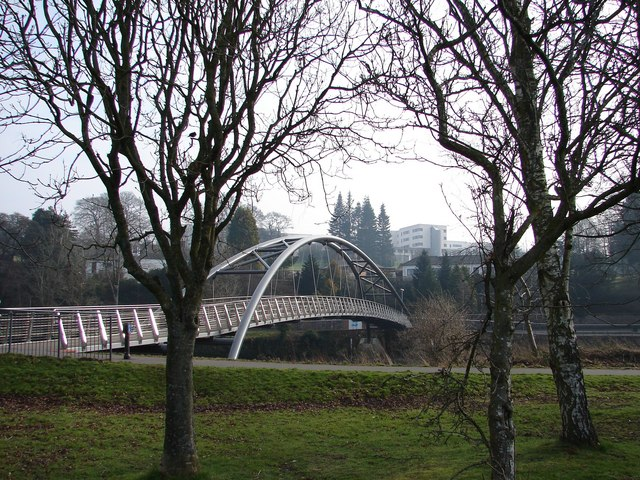
Kirkpatrick Macmillan Footbridge (2006): Southernmost Nith bridge connects Troqueer with Castledykes Park, Crichton complex and the Dumfries & Galloway Royal Infirmary

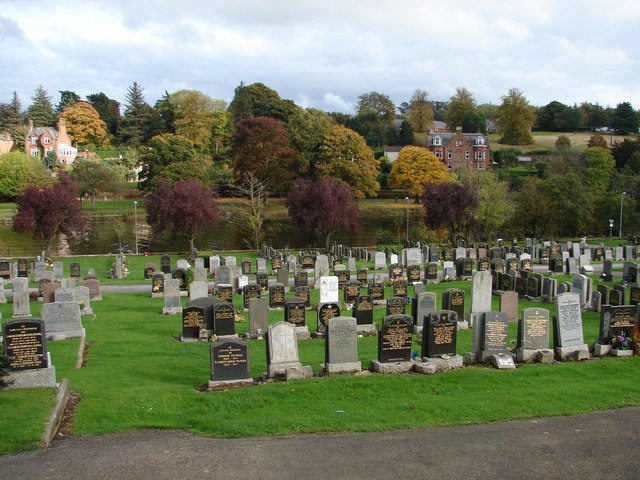
Troqueer Cemetery (South) View from the upper path of Troqueer Cemetery (S) across the River Nith

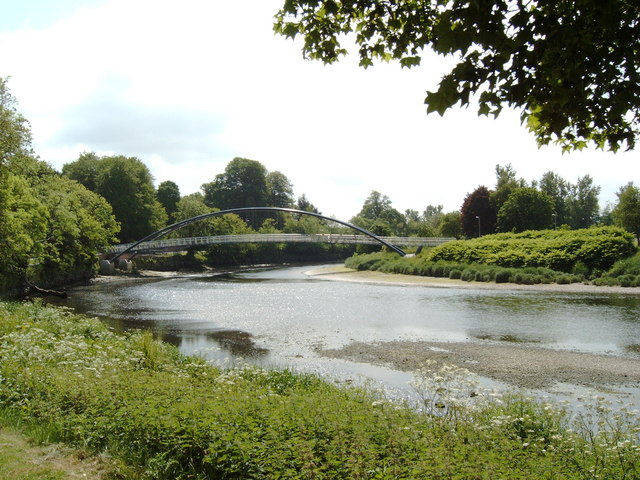
Footbridge over the River Nith Walkway linking Castledykes and Troqueer
