= John Blackadder (soldier) =

Scottish soldier

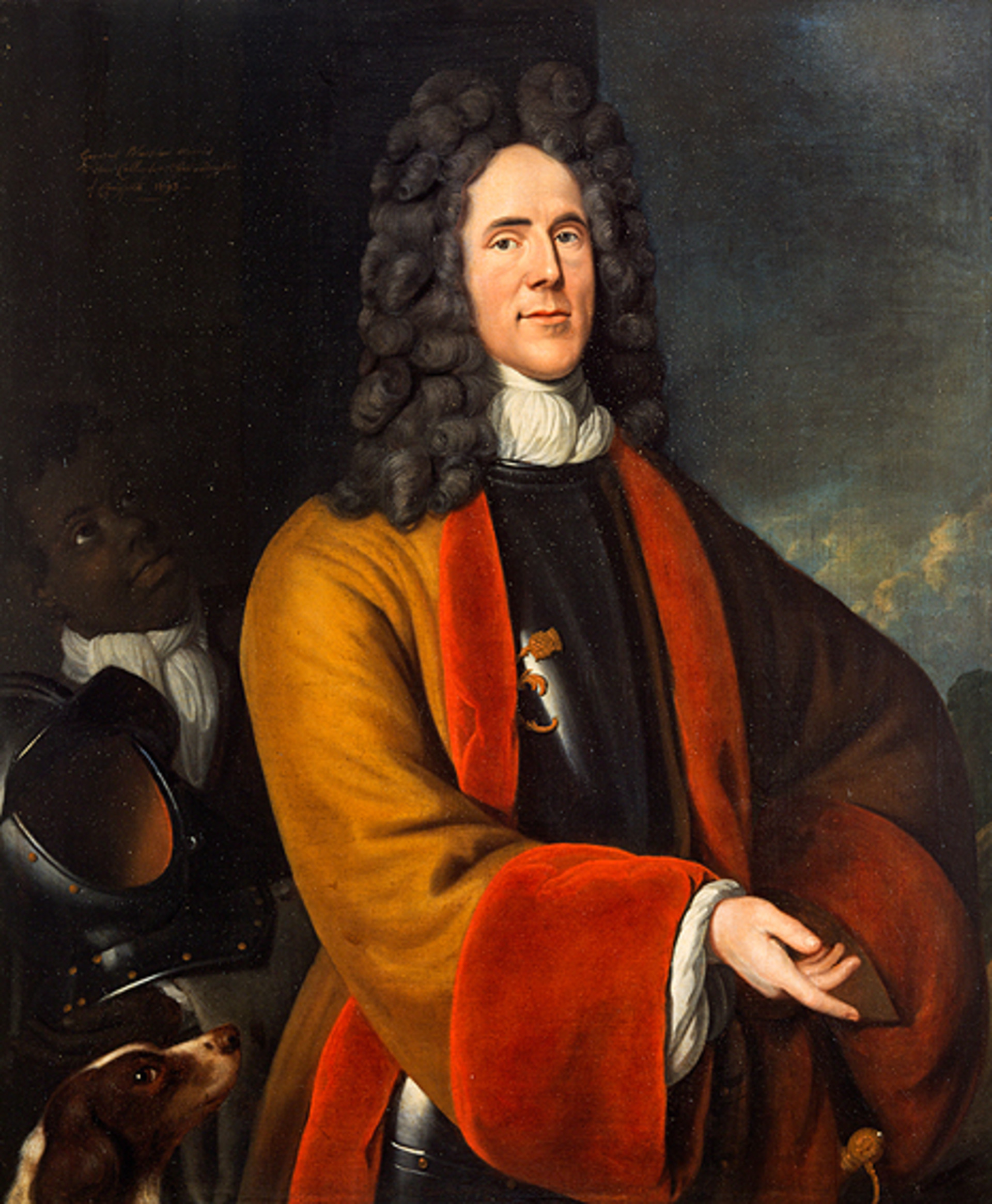
- Portrait of Lieutenant-Colonel John Blackadder (or Blackader), 1664–1729; published 1824
- Born: 14 September 1664; Glencairn, Dumfriesshire, Scotland
- Died: 31 August 1729 (aged 64); Stirling, Scotland
- Occupation: Soldier
- Known for: Lieutenant-colonel of the Cameronian Regiment

Lieutenant-Colonel John Blackadder (14 September 1664 – 31 August 1729) was a Scottish soldier who served with the Cameronian Regiment during the late seventeenth and early eighteenth centuries.

The fifth son of dissenting minister John Blackadder, he was a devout Calvinist, and joined the Cameronians – a predominantly religious regiment – as a volunteer cadet when they were raised in 1689 to fight for King William III. He soldiered with the regiment through the campaign in Flanders, where he was court-martialled and later pardoned for killing an officer in a duel, and then during the War of the Spanish Succession. He was wounded at the Battle of Blenheim, and twice wounded at the siege of Lille; after the Battle of Malplaquet he was promoted to lieutenant-colonel, and took command of the regiment. He resigned his commission two years later, and retired to Edinburgh.

In later life he focused his work on ecclesiastical matters, becoming a member of the General Assembly of the Church of Scotland. During the Jacobite rising of 1715 he was appointed colonel of a regiment raised in Glasgow to guard the city, and after the war made deputy-governor of Stirling Castle.

== Early years ==
John Blackadder was born in September 1664 at Glencairn in Dumfriesshire, the fifth son of John Blackadder and Janet Haining. His father was a Presbyterian minister who had been removed from his parish in 1662, forbidden to preach, and imprisoned on the Bass Rock where he died. John's brothers included William, the eldest son, later a doctor and conspirator with William of Orange, and Adam, the second son, who wrote a history of the covenanting movement.

Shortly after Blackadder's birth, his father began preaching illegally at conventicles in the countryside. A warrant was issued for his arrest in 1666, and the family home was raided by soldiers of the local bishop, after which point the family dispersed to live separately. Blackadder spent some time with his father during this period, from whom he received a basic classical education, and attended humanities classes at the University of Edinburgh in the 1680s. However, he did not formally matriculate as a student.

== Military career ==
Blackadder had developed firm religious views, very much in the mould of his father, and in 1689, on learning that a regiment of soldiers was being raised from among the members of the Cameronian movement, a Presbyterian sect, he volunteered as a cadet.th He was quickly promoted to lieutenant, probably through his connections to the lieutenant-colonel, William Cleland, who he had known at the university. He was originally lieutenant of the fourteenth company.

The regiment had been raised for service in the Jacobite rising of 1689, and was present at the final Battle of Dunkeld in August of that year; here, it fortified the town and held off a strong force of Highlanders. Blackadder himself was uninjured, despite "several falling on my right and left hand".

After garrison duty in Montrose, the Cameronians were moved to Flanders, to fight in the Nine Years' War; Blackadder, now lieutenant of the thirteenth company, went with them. In December 1691, whilst the regiment was quartered at Maastricht, Blackadder was challenged to a duel by Lieutenant Robert Murray of the Royal Scots, which resulted in Murray's death. He was court-martialled for this, but pardoned by the King the following May and restored to his position; it did not seem to affect his standing in the regiment significantly, as he was promoted to captain, commanding a company, in January 1693.

The regiment served at the battles of Steenkirk, in August 1692, and Landen, in July 1693. The regiment remained in the Low Countries for some time, before moving to Perth; in 1702, following the outbreak of the War of the Spanish Succession, they returned to Europe as part of an army under Marlborough. With his regiment, Blackadder fought at Schellenberg and Blenheim in 1704; at Blenheim, he was wounded, but recovered and was promoted to Major in October 1705. He then served at Ramillies in 1706, and Oudenarde and Wynendaele in 1708; the same year, the regiment besieged Lille, where Blackadder was again wounded twice.

At the Battle of Malplaquet in 1709, the regiment's colonel, Cranston, was wounded; Blackadder was promoted lieutenant-colonel and took over command. He led the regiment for two years, through the sieges of Douai and Bouchain, before selling the colonelcy to George Forrester, 5th Lord Forrester in 1711. He left the Army on 12 October.

== Later life ==
After leaving the regiment in the Netherlands, Blackadder returned to Scotland, where he lived in Edinburgh and later Stirling. He was closely involved with the Church of Scotland, becoming an elder of his parish church and a member of the General Assembly.

During the Jacobite rising of 1715, a regiment of loyalist volunteers was raised in Glasgow. It was ordered to garrison Stirling, then under threat from the Highlanders who had occupied Perth. After it had arrived in the city, Blackadder was made its colonel on 20 September. He drilled the volunteers through late September and October, and on 12 November was alerted that a Jacobite force was advancing south. The regiment was posted to guard the bridge which controlled access to the city from the north, and Blackadder remained with them through the night. The Jacobite force was engaged by regular forces the next day at the Battle of Sherrifmuir, about eight miles north-east of the city, and forced to retreat. The battle was at first inconclusive, however, and Blackadder held his forces on the bridge throughout the day in the belief that the Hanoverian army had been routed and the city would shortly be besieged. The volunteer regiment was stood down and marched home on the 22nd, after the news of the Battle of Preston on the 18th had made it clear the Jacobite threat was now passed. Blackadder then joined the main force of the government army, and accompanied them until early February, when Perth was recaptured.

For his services during the rebellion he was appointed the deputy-governor of Stirling Castle in March 1717. He was later made a Justice of the Peace in 1719, and was again appointed to the General Assembly in 1725.

He died on 31 August 1729, aged sixty-four, and was buried in the West Church of Stirling, where a marble tablet was put up by his great-nephew. His wife outlived him, and later married Sir James Campbell of Ardkinglas and Dunderave Castle.
