= List of Falkirk F.C. players =

This is a list of association footballers notable for their contributions to Falkirk F.C., from the formation of the club in 1876 to present. It generally includes players who have made more than 100 league appearances for the club, but some players with fewer than 100 appearances are also included. This includes players who represented their national team while with the club, and players who have set a club record, such as most appearances, most goals or biggest transfer fee.

== Notable players ==
Players who represented their country while at the club.
Club record holder.

Bold type indicates that the player currently plays for the club.

Name	Nationality	Position^{[note]}	Falkirk career	League appearances	League goals	Notes
William Allan	Scotland	GK	1901–04; 1906–08; 1916–21	144	0	
Scott Arfield	Canada	MF	2005–10; 2025	136	23	
Doug Baillie	Scotland	DF	1964–69	104	7	
Crawford Baptie	Scotland	FW	1984–93	223	37	
Darren Barr	Scotland	DF	2003–10	146	6	
Brian Brown	Scotland	DF	1977–84	229	19	
Stuart Burgess	Scotland	DF	1987–90	107	18	
Sandy Burrell	Scotland	DF	1977–82	120	1	
Jim Cameron	Scotland	DF	1973–77	101	2	
Bobby Campbell	Scotland	MF	1946–47	16	6	
Scott Crabbe	Scotland	FW	1996–2000	113	29	
Patrick Cregg	Republic of Ireland	MF	2005–09	107	8	
Jimmy Croal	Scotland	MF	1910–14; 1918–19	107	31	
William Davidson	Scotland	FW	1906–10	110	9	
Kenny Dawson	Scotland	FW	1934–51	208	127	^{[note 1]}
Jim Dempsey	Scotland	DF	1984–88	135	9	
Archie Devine	Scotland	MF	1908–10	43	17	
Ally Donaldson	Scotland	GK	1971–76	138	0	
Jock Drummond	Scotland	DF	1886–92; 1904–06	13	0	
Neil Duffy	Scotland	MF	1990–94	121	19	
Alex Ferguson	Scotland	FW	1969–73	95	37	
Thomas Ferguson	Scotland	GK	1919–32	451	0	^{[note 2]}
Jim Fiddes	Scotland	MF	1946–51	130	16	
Carl Finnigan	England	FW	2006–11	113	25	
Billy Fulton	Scotland	FW	1962–67	130	17	
Jimmy Gallacher	Scotland	DF	1946–54	141	1	
George Gibson	Scotland	DF	1966–77	289	9	
Tom Glancy	Scotland	MF/FW	1914–24	204	36	
Joe Gowdy	Ireland	MF/FW	1920–21; 1924–28	114	29	
Johnny Graham	Scotland	MF	1964–78	175	58	
David Hagen	Scotland	FW	1995–2000	139	11	
John Harvie	Scotland	MF	1915–20	137	23	
John Hay	Scotland	MF	1977–82	153	21	
John Henry	Scotland	MF	1998–2005	111	26	
Peter Hetherston	Scotland	MF	1984–91	149	16	
Myles Hogarth	Scotland	GK	1998–2002	108	0	
Wilson Hoggan	Scotland	MF/DF	1968–83	323	31	
Peter Houston	Scotland	MF	1982–91	212	38	
John Hughes	Scotland	DF	1990–2006	212	12	
Ian Hunter	Scotland	DF	1958–69	244	6	
James Hunter	Scotland	DF	1919–24	136	1	
John Hunter	Scotland	FW	1920–28	199	41	
John Hutcheson	Scotland	MF	1927–34	185	11	
Gareth Hutchison	Scotland	FW	1998–2001	102	22	
Alan Irvine	Scotland	FW	1982–87	110	18	
Kevin James	Scotland	DF	1994–2005	118	15	
Stuart Kennedy	Scotland	DF	1971–76	110	1	
Mark Kerr	Scotland	MF	1998–2003; 2015–2018	205	10	
Robert Keyes	Scotland	FW	1935–41	140	101	
John Lambie	Scotland	DF	1960–69	199	16	
Russell Latapy	Trinidad and Tobago	MF	2003–09	166	23	
Andy Lawrie	Scotland	DF	1995–2006	226	21	
Paul Leetion	Scotland	MF	1976–81	117	23	
Tommy Logan	Scotland	FW/DF	1910–13; 1917–18	99	29	
Alex Low	Scotland	DF	1929–1938	130	6	
Scott MacKenzie	Scotland	MF	1991–2005	309	10	
Alan Mackin	Scotland	DF	1980–84	141	16	
Roddy Manley	Scotland	DF	1984–89	159	2	
John Markie	Scotland	DF	1964–76	347	13	
Gordon Marshall	Scotland	GK	1986–91	171	0	
Eddie May	Scotland	MF	1990–2004	158	32	
Kevin McAllister	Scotland	FW	1983–2002	302	52	
Stephen McDonald	Scotland	MF	1909–17	222	6	
Sam McGivern	Scotland	FW	1986–93	137	32	
Michael McGovern	Northern Ireland	GK	2011–14	105	0	
Jamie McGowan	England	DF	1993–98	131	8	
Jimmy McIntosh	Scotland	DF	1955–63	157	2	
Ralph McKenzie	Scotland	DF	1950–56	110	0	
Vic McKinney	Northern Ireland	MF	1964–68	56	9	
John McLaughlin	Scotland	DF	1967–77	137	12	
Craig McPherson	Scotland	DF	2002–06	121	2	
Jim McPhie	Scotland	DF	1937–53	164	3	
Tommy McQueen	Scotland	DF	1990–95	118	7	
Jamie McQuilken	Scotland	DF	1998–2003	157	5	
Ally McRoberts	Scotland	FW	1977–82	129	35	
John McTavish	Scotland	FW	1905–10; 1917–18	162	37	
Derek McWilliams	Scotland	FW	1987–91	120	41	
George Miller	Scotland	DF	1968–72	107	25	
Lee Miller	Scotland	FW	2000–03; 2015–2018; 2019–2021	143	43	
Doug Moran	Scotland	FW	1956–68	213	82	
John Morrison	Scotland	FW	1907–19	120	18	
Evelyn Morrison	Scotland	FW	1927–30	58	75	^{[note 3]}
Callumn Morrison	Scotland	MF	2020–2025	118	52	
Pedro Moutinho	Portugal	FW	2004–2008; 2009–2010; 2011	140	21	
**Aidan Nesbitt**	Scotland	MF	2021–present	104	17	
David Nicholls	Scotland	MF	1999–2005	123	24	
Andy Nicol	Scotland	DF	1978–91	307	2	
Bobby Olejnik	Austria	GK	2007–11	102	0	
Neil Oliver	England	DF	1991–99	170	3	
Robert Orrock	Scotland	DF	1908–17	195	1	
Alex Parker	Scotland	DF	1952–58	121	2	^{[note 4]}
Tony Parks	England	GK	1992–96	112	0	
John Perry	Scotland	MF	1975–83	201	23	
Jim Pierson	Scotland	DF	1960–65	125	1	
Angus Plumb	Scotland	FW	1949–55	103	57	
Syd Puddefoot	England	FW	1922–25	113	44	^{[note 5]}
Ian Rae	Scotland	DF	1951–66	292	4	
Brent Rahim	Trinidad and Tobago	MF	2003–05	29	0	
Stuart Rennie	Scotland	GK	1968–73	105	0	
Brian Rice	Scotland	MF	1991–96	101	8	
Collin Samuel	Trinidad and Tobago	FW	2002–03	34	11	
Thomas Scott	Scotland	DF	1917–29	387	15	
Andy Seaton	Scotland	DF	1995–2001	112	0	
Jim Shirra	Scotland	MF	1968–77	184	27	
Craig Sibbald	Scotland	MF	2011–18	214	30	
Jock Simpson	England	FW	1905–11; 1916–19	277	115	
Bert Slater	Scotland	GK	1953–59	134	0	
Charlie Smith	Scotland	MF	1965–75	106	11	
Willie Stevenson	Scotland	MF	1978–84	142	11	
Charlie Thomson	Scotland	GK	1930–34	122	0	
Les Thomson	Scotland	DF	1955–64	130	15	
Robert Thomson	Scotland	DF	1925–27	28	0	
Tom Townsley	Scotland	DF	1919–25	244	14	
George Watson	Scotland	GK	1975–87	354	0	
William Watson	Scotland	GK				
David Weir	Scotland	DF	1992–96	133	8	
Willie Whigham	Scotland	GK	1960–67	186	0	
John White	Scotland	MF	1958–59	30	8	
Sammy Wilson	Northern Ireland	FW	1963–66	60	28	

== Key to positions ==
- GK — Goalkeeper
- DF — Defender
- MF — Midfielder
- FW — Forward

== Notes ==
- ^Note: for a full description of positions see Association football positions.
- ^1. Kenny Dawson holds the club record of most league goals.
- ^2. Tom Ferguson holds the club record of most league appearances.
- ^3. Evelyn Morrison holds the club record of most league goals in one season with 39 in 1928–29.
- ^4. Alex Parker holds the record of most international caps earned whilst at the club with 14.
- ^5. In 1922 Syd Puddefoot was transferred from West Ham United to Falkirk for a fee of £5,000 - a world record at the time
