= 1997 Scottish Challenge Cup final =

- Event: 1997–98 Scottish Challenge Cup
Falkirk	Queen of the South
1	0
- Date: 2 November 1997
- Venue: Fir Park, Motherwell
- Referee: R. T. Tait (East Kilbride)
- Attendance: 9,735

The 1997 Scottish Challenge Cup final was an association football match between Falkirk and Queen of the South on 2 November 1997 at Fir Park in Motherwell. It was the eighth final of the Scottish Challenge Cup since it was first organised in 1990 to celebrate the centenary of the Scottish Football League.

The tournament was contested by clubs below the Scottish Premier Division; Falkirk from the First Division and Queen of the South from the Second Division. The match was Falkirk's first national cup final in only six months since contesting the final of the Scottish Cup the previous season in May. It was also the club's second appearance in the Scottish Challenge Cup Final since winning in 1993. The match was Queen of the South's first national cup final in its 78-year history. David Hagen scored the only goal, which was enough for Falkirk to win the match 1–0 and the tournament for the second time.

== Route to the final ==
Round	Opposition	Score
First round	Dumbarton (a)	2–0
Second round	Forfar Athletic (h)	3–1
Quarter-final	Stranraer (h)	3–0
Semi-final	Hamilton Academical (a)	2–1

=== Falkirk ===
Falkirk were drawn against Dumbarton away from home in the first round and produced a 2–0 victory over The Sons. The second round saw Forfar Athletic travel to Brockville Park and be beaten 3–1. Another home game for Falkirk was drawn in the quarter-finals against Stranraer which saw The Bairns triumph 3–0 winners to progress to the semi-finals. The opposition provided was Hamilton Academical which saw Falkirk win with a 2–1 victory and send the club to a Scottish Challenge Cup final for the second time in its history.

=== Queen of the South ===
Round	Opposition	Score
First round	Inverness Caledonian Thistle (a)	2–0
Second round	Stirling Albion (h)	2–0
Quarter-final	Airdrieonians (a)	3–2
Semi-final	Greenock Morton (a)	2–0

Queen of the South faced a long trip to Inverness Caledonian Thistle in the first round which saw the team emerge 2–0 winners. The second round was a home game with the visitors in the form of Stirling Albion with The Doonhamers producing a second consecutive 2–0 victory. A trip to Airdrieonians was the reward for reaching the quarter-finals with Queen of the South edging the opposition out to win 3–2. Morton provided the opposition for the Dumfries club in the semi-finals with the team producing their third 2–0 victory of the tournament. Queen of the South reached the Scottish Challenge Cup final for the first time.

== Pre-match ==
=== Analysis ===
Before the final, after four games played each, both Falkirk and Queen of the South had only conceded four goals between them. Queen of the South earned three clean sheets bettering Falkirk's two. At the other end Falkirk had scored ten goals to Queen of the South's nine.

== Match summary ==
Queens performed creditably against the Falkirk side who at the time were playing in a higher division of the Scottish football set up, cheered on noisily by the QoS supporters witnessing their team in their first national cup final since the Scottish Qualifying Cup win of 1923/24. The decisive moment of the game was when Falkirk's David Hagen scored in the sixty fifth minute. Queens' had a late opportunity to equalise when Tommy Bryce teed up Derek Townsley in a good shooting position just outside the Falkirk penalty area. Townsley's shot however failed to trouble Paul Mathers in the Falkirk goal as the ball went over the cross bar. Hagen's goal was enough to separate the sides with Bryce taking the man of the match award.

== Match statistics ==
2 November 1997
15:00

Falkirk	1–0	Queen of the South
Hagen 65'	Report

Fir Park, Motherwell
Attendance: 9,735
Referee: R Tait

=== Teams ===
FALKIRK:
GK	1	(Scotland) Paul Mathers
DF	2	(Scotland) Martyn Corrigan
DF	3	(England) Jamie McGowan
MF	4	(Scotland) Scott MacKenzie
DF	5	(Scotland) Kevin James
DF	6	(Scotland) Neil Berry
MF	7	(Scotland) Kevin McAllister
MF	8	(Scotland) Albert Craig
FW	9	(Scotland) Paul McGrillen	(substituted off) 74'
MF	10	(England) David Moss
FW	11	(Scotland) David Hagen
Substitutes:
DF	12	(Scotland) Neil Oliver
MF	14	(Scotland) Brian Hamilton
FW	15	(Scotland) Marino Keith	(substituted on) 74'
Manager:
(Scotland) Alex Totten

QUEEN OF THE SOUTH:
GK	1	(Scotland) David Mathieson
DF	2	(Scotland) David Kennedy
DF	3	(Scotland) Andy Aitken
DF	4	(Scotland) George Rowe
DF	5	(Scotland) Jim Thomson
MF	6	(England) Derek Townsley
MF	7	(Scotland) Marc Cleeland	(substituted off) 74'
MF	8	(Scotland) Tommy Bryce
FW	9	(Scotland) Stevie Mallan
FW	10	(Scotland) Ken Eadie	(substituted off) 48'
MF	11	(Scotland) Des McKeown	(substituted off) 83'
Substitutes:
MF	12	(Scotland) Craig Irving	(substituted on) 74'
DF	14	(Scotland) Jamie McAllister	(substituted on) 83'
FW	15	(Scotland) Craig Flannigan	(substituted on) 48'
Manager:
(Scotland) Rowan Alexander
