= 1997–98 Scottish Challenge Cup =

Tournament details
- Country: Scotland
- Teams: 30

Final positions
- Champions: Falkirk
- Runners-up: Queen of the South

Tournament statistics
- Matches played: 29
- Goals scored: 81 (2.79 per match)

The 1997–98 Scottish Challenge Cup was the eighth season of the competition, competed for by the 30 member clubs of the Scottish Football League. The defending champions were Stranraer, who defeated St Johnstone 1–0 in the 1996 final; and lost 3–0 to Falkirk in the Quarter final.

The final was played on 2 November 1997, between Falkirk and Queen of the South at Fir Park in Motherwell. Falkirk won 1–0, to win the tournament for the second time after winning the tournament in 1993.

== Schedule ==
Round	First match date	Fixtures	Clubs
First round	Sat/Tue/Wed 12/13/16 August 1997	14	30 → 16
Second round	Tuesday 26 August 1997	8	16 → 8
Quarter-finals	Tue/Wed/Fri 2/3/5 September 1997	4	8 → 4
Semi-finals	Mon/Wed 15/17 September 1997	2	4 → 2
Final	Sunday 2 November 1997	1	2 → 1

== First round ==
Brechin City and Ross County received random byes into the second round.

9 August 1997	Stranraer	4 – 4 (a.e.t.) (4–2 p)	Arbroath	Stair Park, Stranraer
	Young 15'; Docherty 25'; Friels 70'; Crawford 119'		Thomson 3'; Peters 86'; Gallagher 90'; Spence 116'

12 August 1997	Ayr United	3–0	Queen's Park	Somerset Park, Ayr
	Kerrigan 9', 58' (pen.); Wordsworth 72'

12 August 1997	Berwick Rangers	1–0	Montrose	Shielfield Park, Berwick-upon-Tweed
	Walton 53'

12 August 1997	Clyde	2–4	Raith Rovers	Broadwood Stadium, Cumbernauld
	Gauley 36'; Gibson 61'		Wright 13'; Cameron 18'; Lennon 64'; Dair 74'

12 August 1997	Cowdenbeath	0–1	Clydebank	Central Park, Cowdenbeath
			Lovering 4'

12 August 1997	Dumbarton	0–2	Falkirk	Boghead Park, Dumbarton
	Reilly (red card) 90'		Corrigan 8'; McGraw 44'

12 August 1997	East Fife	1 – 0 (a.e.t.)	St Mirren	Bayview Park, Methil
	Dyer 114'; Gillies (red card) 89'

12 August 1997	Forfar Athletic	2–1	East Stirlingshire	Station Park, Forfar
	Mann 3'; Glennie 83'		Parks 72'; Campbell (red card) 58'

12 August 1997	Hamilton Academical	2–1	Partick Thistle	Firhill Stadium, Glasgow
	Ritchie 72', 87'		Hetherston 23'

12 August 1997	Greenock Morton	3–1	Albion Rovers	Cappielow, Greenock
	Flannery 2' (pen.), 35'; Anderson 76'		Bruce 72'

12 August 1997	Stenhousemuir	1 – 1 (a.e.t.) (4–5 p)	Livingston
	Henderson 106'		Magee 116'

13 August 1997	Airdrieonians	1–0	Dundee	Broadwood Stadium, Cumbernauld
	Cooper 88'

13 August 1997	Inverness Caledonian Thistle	0–2	Queen of the South	Caledonian Stadium, Inverness
			Flannigan 54'; Rowe 59'

13 August 1997	Stirling Albion	2–1	Alloa Athletic	Forthbank Stadium, Stirling
	Paterson 18'; McKechnie 81'		Irvine 48'

Source: Soccerbase

== Second round ==
26 August 1997	Ayr United	0 – 1 (a.e.t.)	Clydebank	Somerset Park, Ayr
			McCall 110'

26 August 1997	Berwick Rangers	1–4	Airdrieonians	Shielfield Park, Berwick-upon-Tweed
	Walton 47'		Lawrence 10'; Connelly 28'; Black 44'; Cooper 48'

26 August 1997	Brechin City	2–1	Livingston	Glebe Park, Brechin
	Brand 4'; Feroz 27'		Raynes 73'

26 August 1997	Falkirk	3–1	Forfar Athletic	Brockville Park, Falkirk
	Craig 18' (pen.), 45', 76'		Morgan 35' (pen.)

26 August 1997	Hamilton Academical	2–1	East Fife	Firhill Stadium, Glasgow
	Cunnington 44'; Davidson 82'		Moffat 27'

26 August 1997	Queen of the South	2–0	Stirling Albion	Palmerston Park, Dumfries
	Mallan 54', 55'

26 August 1997	Raith Rovers	0–1	Stranraer	Stark's Park, Kirkcaldy
			Young 69'

26 August 1997	Ross County	1–2	Greenock Morton
	Wood 89'		Blaikie 33', 74'

Source: Soccerbase

== Quarter-finals ==
2 September 1997

Queen of the South	3–2	Airdrieonians
Mallan 26', 42'; Flannigan 66'	Report	McPhee 45', 80'

Palmerston Park, Dumfries

3 September 1997

Falkirk	3–0	Stranraer
Craig 72'; McGrillen 77'; Hagen 90'	Report

Brockville Park, Falkirk

3 September 1997

Greenock Morton	1–0	Clydebank
McArthur 85'	Report

Cappielow, Greenock

5 September 1997

Hamilton Academical	4–0	Brechin City
McFarlane 48'; Cunnington 52'; Geraghty 62', 85'	Report

Firhill Stadium, Glasgow

== Semi-finals ==
15 September 1997

Hamilton Academical	1–2	Falkirk
Clark 89'; Quintongo (red card) 44'	Report	McAllister 22'; McGowan 57'

Firhill Stadium, Glasgow

17 September 1997

Greenock Morton	0–2	Queen of the South
	Report	Flannigan 2'; Mallan 54'

Cappielow, Greenock

== Final ==
2 November 1997
15:00

Falkirk	1–0	Queen of the South
Hagen 65'	Report

Fir Park, Motherwell
Attendance: 9,735
Referee: R. Tait

== Notes ==
A. The 1998–99 tournament was suspended due to lack of sponsorship
