= Ronnie Bradford (football chairman) =

Scottish football chairman (1942–2009)

Ronald John Bradford (Ronnie) (24 February 1942 – 16 July 2009) was the Scottish former chairman of Queen of the South football club. Bradford was the second of the three chairman to re-build and revitalise the Dumfries club from the mid '90s replacing the previous regime under which the club had gone into stagnation and decline from the late 1960s.

== Queens pre Bradford ==
Norman Blount became chairman of Queen of the South in April 1994. Very quickly new ideas came along that showed that the club was in a new era:-

- The new stand was built within one year of Blount becoming chairman.
- The club became the first senior club in the UK to establish a club museum.
- Queen of the South became the first club in the world to deploy astro turf on the outside of the touch line on a grass pitch (for linesmen to run along). Initially the Scottish Football Association agreed to this as a 12-month experiment. However, such was the success of the astro turf that the SFA brought the experiment to an early close and sanctioned use of this idea for any other club interested.
- The first senior club in the UK to use a lottery scheme to decide the annual shirt sponsor. Such was the success of the idea that the club became inundated with calls from other clubs enquiring on the best way to set such a scheme up.

The highlight on the pitch of the Blount regime was Queens making it to the final of the Scottish Challenge Cup for the first time. This was in 1997 where a battling Queens side lost out by 1-0 to Falkirk. Man of the match was Queens' Tommy Bryce. However, in November 1999 Blount candidly announced that he felt that he had taken the club as far as he could and resigned from being chairman.

Two time divisional player of the year Andy Thomson was transferred for a Queens record fee of £250,000 in 1994. As Thomson was to say on his return over a decade later, "Things have changed quite a bit while I've been away - a new stand, a completely new set-up and a more modern type of training system". Thomson added, "Norman Blount was an excellent chairman."

Players to have signed for Queens during the Blount regime include Jamie McAllister, Derek Townsley, Jim Thomson, David Lilley, David Mathieson and Andy Aitken.

== The Bradford era ==
The chairmanship was taken over by Ronnie Bradford who continued the progressive ambition started under Blount. It has been under Bradford that the seeds at 'New Queens' further came to fruition, namely:-

- Winning the 2001-02 Scottish Second Division to return to the top half of Scottish football
- Winning the 2002-03 Scottish Challenge Cup

Players to have joined Queens in the Bradford era include Robbie Neilson, Andy Goram and Willie Gibson.

Ronnie Bradford left due to ill health in June 2003.

== Queens post Bradford ==
The Queens chairmanship was taken over by Davie Rae.

Queens progressed to the 2006-07 Scottish Cup quarter final before losing 2-1 to Hibernian. At the end of that season Davie Rae announced that Queens were to go full-time for the 2007-08 season. This was to produce remarkable success.

Queens surpassed the 2006-07 Scottish Cup run by progressing beyond the quarter finals and then eliminating Aberdeen in the 2007-08 semi final. In the club's first ever Scottish Cup final Queens went down 3-2 to Rangers but still qualified for the 2nd qualification round of the UEFA Cup. After an injury plagued start to the season Queens recovered to finish fourth in the second tier of Scottish football.

In the 2008-09 UEFA Cup second qualification round Queens were eliminated after a battling away leg against FC Nordsjælland in Denmark.
