= 2004 Scottish Challenge Cup final =

- The match programme cover
- Event: 2004–05 Scottish Challenge Cup
| Falkirk | Ross County |
| 2 | 1 |
- Date: 7 November 2004
- Venue: McDiarmid Park, Perth
- Referee: K. Clark (Paisley)
- Attendance: 7,471

The 2004 Scottish Challenge Cup final, also known as the Bell's Cup final for sponsorship reasons, was an association football match between Falkirk and Ross County on 7 November 2004 at McDiarmid Park in Perth. It was the 14th final of the Scottish Challenge Cup since it was first organised in 1990 to celebrate the centenary of the Scottish Football League.

Falkirk emerged winners after defeating Ross County 2–1 with goals from Neil Scally and Darryl Duffy to win the tournament for a third time after winning the 1993 and 1997 finals.

== Route to the final ==
=== Falkirk ===
| Round | Opposition | Score |
|---|---|---|
| First round | Ayr United (a) | 3–0 |
| Second round | Stirling Albion (h) | 5–3 |
| Quarter-final | Gretna (h) | 3–0 |
| Semi-final | St Johnstone (a) | 2–1 |

The first round draw paired The Bairns with Ayr United at Somerset Park with the home team emerging 3–0 victors. The second round was a home game against neighbours Stirling Albion for Falkirk at Ochilview Park producing a high scoring 5–3 win to progress to the quarter-finals. The opponents drawn were Gretna at home in the quarter-finals and Falkirk won with their second 3–0 victory of the tournament. The reward for reaching the semi-final was an away game at St. Johnstone with Falkirk edging out the opponents to win 2–1 to book a place in the final. Falkirk reached the Scottish Challenge Cup final for the third time, since winning the 1993 final against St Mirren and defeating Queen of the South in the 1997 final.

=== Ross County ===
| Round | Opposition | Score |
|---|---|---|
| First round | St Mirren (h) | 2–1 |
| Second round | Peterhead (a) | 2–1 |
| Quarter-final | Partick Thistle (h) | 1–1 (a.e.t.) (5–3 pen.) |
| Semi-final | Forfar Athletic (h) | 5–2 |

Ross County were drawn against St. Mirren at home in the first round and County produced a 2–1 victory over the club. The second round draw saw The Staggies drawn against Peterhead away from home with Ross County emerging 2–1 winners for the second consecutive game. The quarter-final draw brought with Partick Thistle all the way to Victoria Park which saw Ross County edging out a 5–3 win on penalties after a 1–1 draw after extra time to progress to the semi-finals. The opposition provided in the semi-final draw was Forfar Athletic and another home game which saw the Dingwall outfit triumph with a 5–2 victory to proceed to the Scottish Challenge Cup final for the first time in the club's history.

== Pre-match ==
=== Analysis ===
Falkirk had played two games at their shared home of Ochilview Park and two away in the games preceding the final with Ross County playing a total of three games at Victoria Park and one away from home. In the process Falkirk amassed a total of thirteen goals scored and a mere four goals conceded whilst keeping two clean sheets. Ross County scored ten goals before the final and conceded a total of five, managing to keep no clean sheets. Falkirk progressed winners through all four games in 90 minutes of play, whereas it took penalties before Ross County emerged as winners over Partick Thistle in the quarter-final. This was Falkirk's third time competing in the Scottish Challenge Cup final, whilst holding a 100% record after winning both the 1993 and 1997 finals. Ross County were appearing in the final for the first time in the club's history.

== Match ==
7 November 2004
15:00 GMT

| Falkirk | 2–1 | Ross County |
|---|---|---|
| Scally 70'; Duffy 75' | Report | Winters 56' |

McDiarmid Park, Perth
Attendance: 7,471
Referee: Kenny Clark (Paisley)

| Falkirk | Ross County |

=== Teams ===
Falkirk:
| GK | 1 | (Scotland) Allan Ferguson |
| RB | 2 | (Scotland) Andy Lawrie |
| LB | 3 | (Scotland) Craig McPherson |
| CM | 4 | (Scotland) Scott MacKenzie |
| CB | 5 | (Scotland) Mark Campbell | Booked |
| CB | 6 | (Scotland) Kevin James (c) |
| RM | 7 | (Scotland) John O'Neil | | (substituted off) 25' |
| LM | 8 | (Scotland) David Nicholls | | (substituted off) 50' |
| CF | 9 | (Scotland) Andy Thomson | | (substituted off) 72' |
| CM | 10 | (Trinidad and Tobago) Russell Latapy |
| CF | 11 | (Scotland) Darryl Duffy |
Substitutes:
| FW | 12 | (Portugal) Pedro Moutinho | | (substituted on) 50' |
| MF | 14 | (Scotland) Neil Scally | | (substituted on) 25' |
| FW | 15 | (Australia) Daniel McBreen | | (substituted on) 72' |
| MF | 16 | (Scotland) Kieran McAnespie |
| GK | 17 | (Scotland) Darren Hill |
Manager:
(Scotland) John Hughes

Ross County:
| GK | 1 | (Scotland) Stuart Garden |
| RB | 2 | (Scotland) John Robertson |
| LB | 3 | (Scotland) Mark McCulloch |
| CM | 4 | (Scotland) Jamie McCunnie |
| CB | 5 | (Scotland) Martin Canning |
| CB | 6 | (Scotland) Jim Lauchlan (c) |
| CM | 7 | (Scotland) Don Cowie |
| LM | 8 | (Scotland) Charlie Adam | (substituted off) 60' |
| CF | 9 | (Scotland) Sean Higgins | (substituted off) 66' |
| RM | 10 | (Scotland) John Rankin |
| CF | 11 | (Scotland) David Winters | (substituted off) 80' |
Substitutes:
| DF | 12 | (Scotland) Stuart Malcolm | (substituted on) 80' |
| MF | 14 | (Scotland) Sean Kilgannon | (substituted on) 60' |
| FW | 15 | (Scotland) Steven McGarry | (substituted on) 66' |
| FW | 16 | (Scotland) Gary McSwegan |
| GK | 17 | (Scotland) Colin Stewart |
Manager:
(Scotland) Alex Smith

MATCH RULES

- 90 minutes
- 30 minutes of extra time if necessary
- Penalty shootout if scores still level
- Five named substitutes
- Maximum of 3 substitutions
