= George Rowe (footballer) =

Scottish footballer

Personal information
- Date of birth: 23 August 1968 (age 58)
- Place of birth: Glasgow, Scotland
- Position: Centre-back

Youth career
- 1987–1989: Kilpatrick Juveniles

Senior career*
Years	Team	Apps	(Gls)
1989–1992	Clydebank	91	(10)
1992–2000	Queen of the South	184	(17)
2000–2002	Arbroath	64	(9)
2002–2005	Stirling Albion	84	(7)
Total		423	(43)

Managerial career
- Queen of the South
- * Club domestic league appearances and goals

George Rowe (born 23 August 1968) is a Scottish former professional footballer who played as a centre-back for Clydebank, Arbroath, Queen of the South and Stirling Albion.

== Clydebank ==
Rowe started his senior career with Clydebank at the start of the 1989-90 season, having previously played with Kilpatrick Juveniles for a few years. Rowe played in 91 league appearances and scored 10 goals in three seasons at the Kilbowie Park club.

== Queen of the South ==
Rowe then signed for Queen of the South in Dumfries at the start of the 1992-93 season where he remained for the next 8 years. In his final season at Palmerston Park, Rowe was appointed joint player-manager alongside Ken Eadie and towards the end of that season Hamilton Academical were deducted 15 points for failing to play a match because of a players' strike. This resulted in Queens escaping relegation to the bottom tier of Scottish football by 4 points, as the club had 29 points to the Accies 25 points. With Queens chairman Norman Blount injecting much needed capital into Queens revival, some of Rowe's team-mates included Tommy Bryce, Jim Thomson and Andy Aitken, as the Doonhamers reached the 1997–98 Scottish Challenge Cup Final, narrowly defeated 1-0 by Falkirk in a battling performance. Most notably, Derek Townsley, who moved on to play for Motherwell, Hibernian and Gretna, missed a gilt-edged chance to equalise in the closing minutes of the match. Jamie McAllister, who went on to play for Aberdeen, Livingston and Hearts in Scotland and also Bristol City, Yeovil Town and Exeter City in England was also a used substitute in the closing minutes of the match.

Rowe played in 184 league matches for the Doonhamers and scored 17 goals in his 8 years with the Dumfries club.

== Arbroath ==
Rowe then signed for the Red Lichties at the start of the 2000-01 season and stayed at Gayfield Park for two years, playing in 64 league matches and scored 9 goals.

== Stirling Albion ==
Rowe then signed for Stirling Albion at the start of the 2002-03 season and stayed at Forthbank for three years, playing in 84 league matches and scored 7 goals before retiring through injury at the end of the 2004-05 season.
