= 1997–98 Livingston F.C. season =

Livingston
1997–98 season
- Manager: Ray Stewart
- Stadium: Almondvale Stadium
- Scottish Second Division: Third place
- Scottish Cup: Third round
- League Cup: Second round
- Challenge Cup: Second round
- Top goalscorer: League: Graham Harvey (14); All: Graham Harvey (16)
Home colours	Away colours

Season 1997–98 saw Livingston compete in the Scottish Second Division. They also competed in the Challenge Cup, League Cup and the Scottish Cup.

== Summary ==
In their second season in the Second Division, Livingston finished third, narrowly missing out on promotion by one point. They reached the second round of the Challenge Cup, the second round of the League Cup and the third round of the Scottish Cup.

== Results & fixtures ==
Win Draw Loss

=== Scottish Second Division ===
6 August 1997 1	Inverness Caledonian Thistle	1 – 1	Livingston	Caledonian Stadium
	Thomson 89'		Thomson 47'

16 August 1997 2	Livingston	1 – 0	Stranraer	Almondvale Stadium
	Harvey 80'

23 August 1997 3	Stenhousemuir	1 – 1	Livingston	Ochilview Park
	Little 74'		Raynes 80'

30 August 1997 4	Livingston	3 – 1	Queen of the South	Almondvale Stadium
	Harvey 2 pen.', 24 pen.', 49'		Flannigan 74'

13 September 1997 5	Brechin City	0 – 2	Livingston	Glebe Park
			Forrest 20'; Young 32'

20 September 1997 6	East Fife	2 – 3	Livingston	Bayview Park
	Cusick (red card) 15'; Moffat 42'; Callaghan 63 o.g.' Ryan (red card) 89'		Williamson (red card) 23'; Duthie 39 pen.' Magee 65'; Foster 75'

27 September 1997 7	Livingston	0 – 0	Clydebank	Almondvale Stadium
			McLaughlin (red card) 42'

4 October 1997 8	Clyde	1 – 0	Livingston	Broadwood Stadium
	Rice 21 pen.'

18 October 1997 9	Livingston	4 – 3	Forfar Athletic	Almondvale Stadium
	Tralist 1'; McLeod 49'; Magee 53'; Bailey 79'		Honeyman 20', 90'; Cargill (red card) 56'; McLaughlin 68'

25 October 1997 10	Livingston	2 – 1	Stenhousemuir	Almondvale Stadium
	McLeod 25'; Young 48'		Hunter 68'

1 November 1997 11	Stranraer	1 – 1	Livingston	Stair Park
	Knox 59'		Forrest 75'

8 November 1997 12	Queen of the South	1 – 0	Livingston	Palmerston Park
	Bryce 44'

15 November 1997 13	Livingston	5 – 2	Brechin City	Almondvale Stadium
	Harvey 4'; Bailey 30'; Raynes 53'; Maskrey 60'; Christie 75 o.g.'		Christie 69'; McNeill 74'

22 November 1997 14	Clydebank	1 – 1	Livingston	Boghead Park
	Lovering 34'		Foster 87'

3 December 1997 15	Livingston	1 – 0	East Fife	Almondvale Stadium
	Bailey 10'

13 December 1997 16	Forfar Athletic	2 – 2	Livingston	Station Park
	Watson 20 o.g.' McLaughlin 37'		Conway 5'; Young 67'

20 December 1997 17	Livingston	0 – 2	Clyde	Almondvale Stadium
			Carrigan 7'; Gibson 32'

27 December 1997 18	Stenhousemuir	1 – 2	Livingston	Ochilview Park
	Little 40'; Christie (red card) 69'		Bailey 41'; Harvey 73'

31 January 1998 19	East Fife	2 – 0	Livingston	Bayview Park
	Ronald 62'; Allan 73'

7 February 1998 20	Livingston	4 – 0	Forfar Athletic	Almondvale Stadium
	Young 4'; Forrest 8', 49'; Harvey 44'		Glennie (red card) 79'

10 February 1998 21	Livingston	0 – 3	Clydebank	Almondvale Stadium
			Teale 36', 56'; McLaughlin 47'

17 February 1998 22	Clyde	0 – 3	Livingston	Broadwood Stadium
	King (red card) 59'		McLeod 30'; Graham 70'; Harvey 75 pen.'

21 February 1998 23	Inverness Caledonian Thistle	2 – 2	Livingston	Caledonian Stadium
	Shearer 37'; McCulloch 44'		Raynes 16'; Harvey 22'

25 February 1998 24	Livingston	0 – 1	Stranraer	Almondvale Stadium
			Young 59'

3 March 1998 25	Livingston	2 – 2	Inverness Caledonian Thistle	Almondvale Stadium
	Harvey 20 pen.', 37'		Robson 19'; Calder (red card) 36'; Wilson 81'

14 March 1998 26	Clydebank	0 – 2	Livingston	Boghead Park
			McLeod 9 pen.' Callaghan 21'

17 March 1998 27	Brechin City	0 – 2		Glebe Park
			Callaghan 31'; Moore 43'

21 March 1998 28	Livingston	2 – 2	East Fife	Almondvale Stadium
	Callaghan 40'; Fleming 79'		Allan 44'; Dyer 56'

25 March 1998 29	Livingston	1 – 1	Queen of the South	Almondvale Stadium
	Callaghan 53'		Watson 63 o.g.'

28 March 1998 30	Forfar Athletic	2 – 1	Livingston	Station Park
	McLaughlin 4'; Allison 84'		Harvey 90 pen.'

7 April 1998 31	Livingston	4 – 0	Clyde	Almondvale Stadium
	Harvey 61', 69'; Callaghan 78', 83'

11 April 1998 32	Queen of the South	0 – 1	Livingston	Palmerston Park
			Conway 5'

18 April 1998 33	Livingston	1– 0	Brechin City	Almondvale Stadium
	Fleming 10'

25 April 1998 34	Livingston	1 – 1	Stenhousemuir	Almondvale Stadium
	Watson (red card) 44'; Wright 47'		Little 84'

2 May 1998 35	Stranraer	2 – 0	Livingston	Stair Park
	George 57'; English 73'

9 May 1998 36	Livingston	1 – 2	Inverness Caledonian Thistle	Almondvale Stadium
	Graham 47'		Stewart 34'; Sheerin 74'

=== Scottish League Cup ===
9 August 1987 Second round	Livingston	0 – 2	Heart of Midlothian	Almondvale Stadium
			McCann 25', 26'	Attendance: 4,869

=== Scottish Challenge Cup ===
12 August 1987 First rond	Stenhousemuir	1 – 1 (a.e.t.) (4–5 p)	Livingston	Ochilview Park
	Henderson 106'		Magee 116'

26 August 1997 Second round	Brechin City	2 – 1	Livingston	Glebe Park
	Brand 4'; Feroz 27'		Raynes 73'

=== Scottish Cup ===
7 January 1998 Second round	Livingston	2 – 1	Berwick Rangers	Almondvale Stadium

24 January 1998 Third round	Livingston	3 – 3	Albion Rovers	Almondvale Stadium

2 February 1998 Third round replay	Albion Rovers	0 – 0 (a.e.t.) (6–5 p)	Livingston	Cliftonhill

== Statistics ==
=== League table ===
Pos	Team	Pld	W	D	L	GF	GA	GD	Pts	Promotion or relegation
1	Stranraer (C, P)	36	18	7	11	62	44	+18	61	Promotion to the First Division
2	Clydebank (P)	36	16	12	8	48	31	+17	60	Promotion to the First Division
3	Livingston	36	16	11	9	56	40	+16	59	
4	Queen of the South	36	15	9	12	57	51	+6	54	
5	Inverness CT	36	13	10	13	65	51	+14	49	

Source: "1997-1998 Second Division - SPFL Archive". SPFL (in Malay).
Rules for classification: 1) points; 2) goal difference; 3) number of goals scored.
(C) Champions; (P) Promoted
