= Heurelho Gomes =

Brazilian footballer (born 1981)

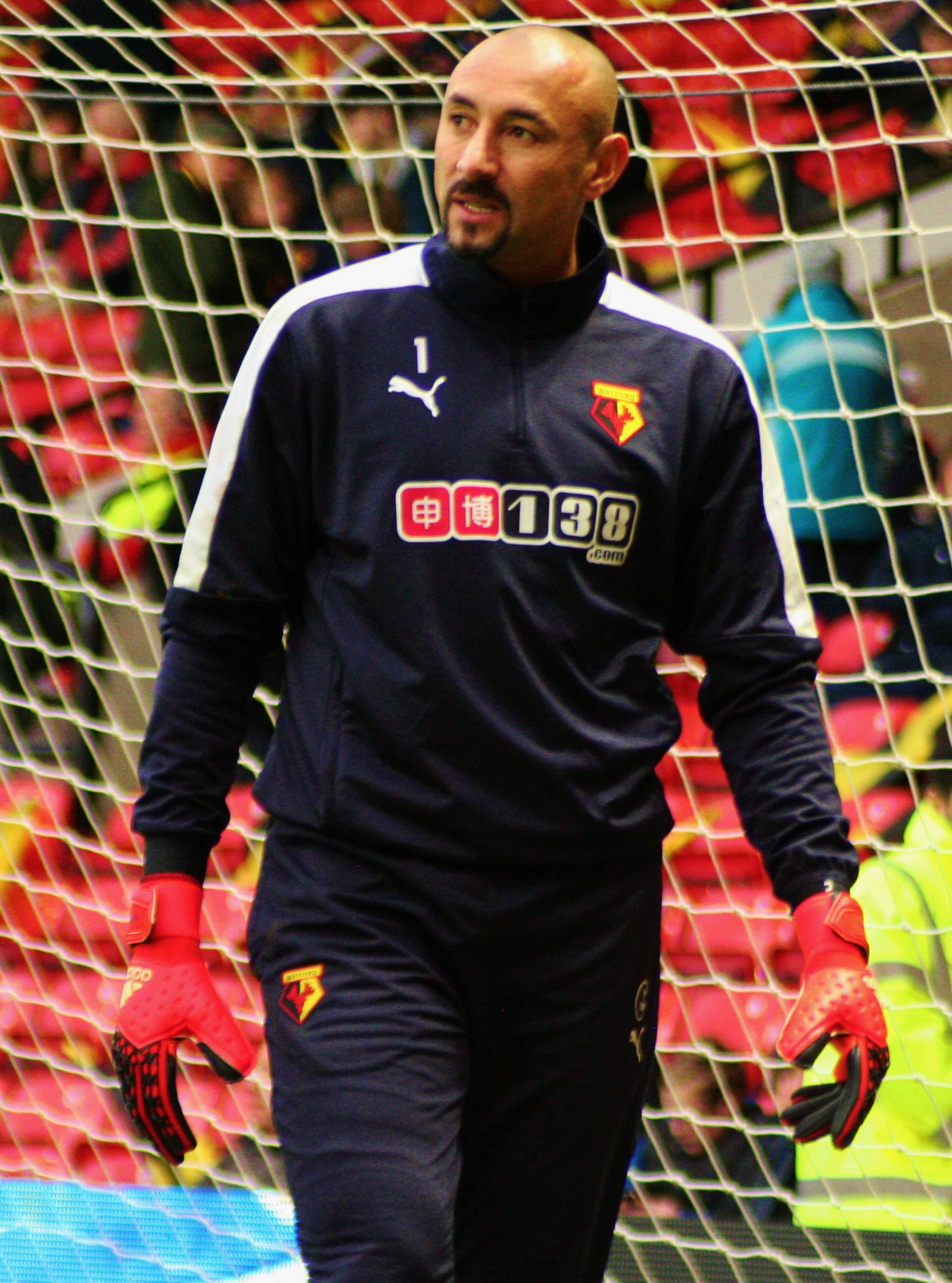
- Gomes at Watford in 2015

Personal information
- Full name: Heurelho da Silva Gomes
- Date of birth: 15 February 1981 (age 45)
- Place of birth: João Pinheiro, Minas Gerais, Brazil
- Height: 1.91 m (6 ft 3 in)
- Position: Goalkeeper

Youth career
- 1999–2001: Democrata SL
- 2001: Cruzeiro

Senior career*
Years	Team	Apps	(Gls)
2002–2004	Cruzeiro	59	(0)
2004–2008	PSV	128	(0)
2008–2014	Tottenham Hotspur	95	(0)
2013	→ 1899 Hoffenheim (loan)	9	(0)
2014–2020	Watford	144	(0)
2021	Democrata SL	0	(0)
Total		435	(0)

International career
2003–2004	Brazil U23	14	(0)
2003–2010	Brazil	11	(0)
Medal record
Representing Brazil
FIFA Confederations Cup
Winner	2005 Germany
- * Club domestic league appearances and goals

Heurelho da Silva Gomes (born 15 February 1981) is a Brazilian former professional footballer who played as a goalkeeper.

He played for Premier League clubs Tottenham Hotspur and Watford, having previously made a name for himself at Dutch club PSV Eindhoven.

Gomes made 11 appearances for the Brazil national team between 2003 and 2010 and was part of their 23-man 2010 World Cup squad.

== Club career ==
=== Cruzeiro ===
Gomes began as a forward, only becoming a goalkeeper at age 19. Gomes started his career in his native country Brazil at Cruzeiro, where he played 59 games between 2001 and 2004. Here, he was scouted by Piet de Visser and in July 2004, he was sold to PSV.

=== PSV ===
Gomes made his debut for the Eindhoven club against Serbian side Red Star Belgrade on 11 August 2004. He conceded two goals in his league debut against RBC Roosendaal, which PSV won 5–2, but secured his first team place and played a major part in PSV's four consecutive titles in the Eredivisie and European achievements. In his first season, PSV reached the semi-finals of the UEFA Champions League, where in their 14 previous attempts, they had not reached the second round. In the following seasons, PSV progressed each time from the group stage.

In the Eredivisie, Gomes was known for his reflexes, which saved points for PSV more than once. He was also able to throw the ball deep into the opponent's half. In a match against Feyenoord, Gomes injured himself whilst celebrating a goal scored by his teammate Phillip Cocu. However, he managed to continue and later managed to make an important save, keeping his side in the game, which they went on to draw.

=== Tottenham Hotspur ===
Following the appointment of manager Juande Ramos, Gomes signed for Tottenham Hotspur on 27 June 2008 for a fee was believed to be around £7.8 million. Gomes played his first game in Tottenham colours in a pre-season friendly match on 19 July 2008 against Spanish Segunda División B side Dénia, which Tottenham won 4–2.

Gomes eventually obtained a work permit to play in the United Kingdom, despite playing less than the 75% required number of games for Brazil in the last two years. Gomes made his home debut on 10 August 2008, keeping a clean sheet with a 5–0 victory over Roma on Tottenham's last pre-season friendly, before the 2008–09 Premier League began.

Tottenham lost their two opening games 2–1 to Middlesbrough and Sunderland respectively, but his presence in goal helped Spurs earn their first point of the season with a draw against rival club Chelsea at Stamford Bridge. His reputation took a hit a week later, however, when he conceded a weak shot from Ashley Young in Spurs' 2–1 home defeat against Aston Villa. These blunders continued as he conceded an own goal in a London derby against Fulham on 15 November 2008, which kept his club mired deep in the relegation zone and also caused Spurs goalkeeping coach Hans Leitert to be sacked on 19 November 2008, with the appointment of former Spurs goalkeeper Tony Parks made shortly after.

Gomes went on to put in a strong performance against West Ham United, saving two shots deep into the match in which Tottenham won 2–0, before making two important saves to deny Park Ji-sung and Ryan Giggs in a 0–0 draw with Manchester United.

Gomes was injured in Spurs' 5–1 win over Hull City in the second game of the 2009–10 Premier League season and had to be replaced by second-choice goalkeeper Carlo Cudicini. After an MRI scan, it was revealed that Gomes suffered damage to his groin which would keep him out for up to a month. He made his return to first team action in the 5–1 victory over Preston North End in the League Cup on 23 September 2009, and made his Premier League comeback in the 2–1 win at Portsmouth on 17 October. During this match, the Brazilian made a handful of brilliant saves, one of which was compared by former Spurs goalkeeper Pat Jennings to a famous save made by Gordon Banks against Brazil in the 1970 FIFA World Cup.

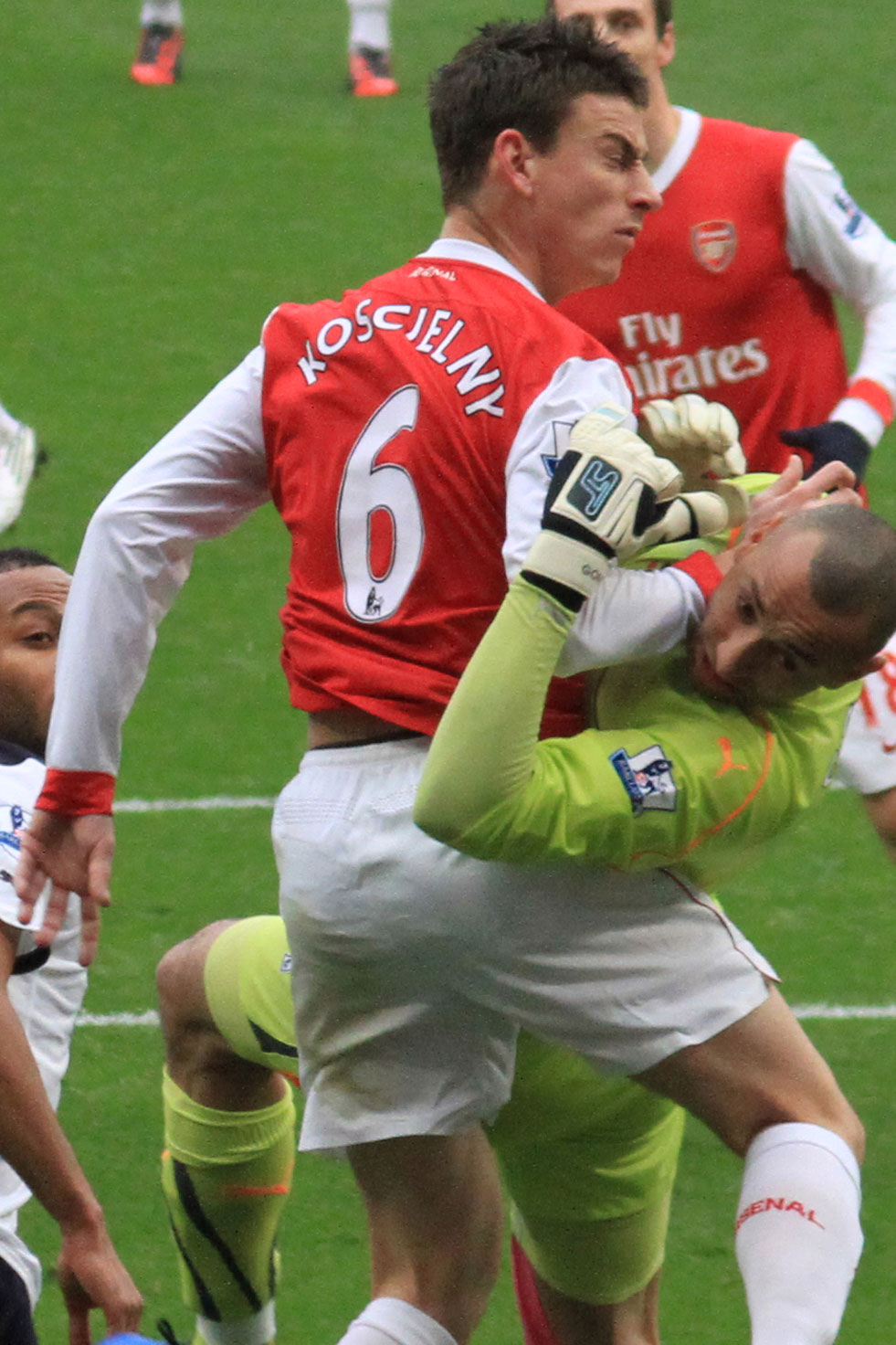
Gomes (in green) clashing with Arsenal defender Laurent Koscielny in a North London derby in November 2010

On 3 April 2010, he made two penalty saves out of three against in a 3–1 defeat away at Sunderland, then on 14 April, Gomes' fine form aided Spurs in picking up their first Premier League victory over Arsenal in 21 meetings; he saved a Robin van Persie free kick and several other attempts on goal in succession. The following week, on 17 April, Gomes again made several crucial saves as Tottenham beat Chelsea 2–1 as the team passed Manchester City to sit fourth in the League standings. He kept a clean sheet in a 1–0 win over Bolton Wanderers and then played a vital role in the 1–0 victory against Manchester City with two crucial saves which saw Tottenham get into the UEFA Champions League for the first time ever.

On 20 October 2010, Gomes received a red card for fouling Jonathan Biabiany within the first ten minutes of the first half against European Champions Inter Milan at the San Siro in the Champions League. Tottenham Hotspur lost the match 4–3 after going 4–0 down inside the first 35 minutes, despite a second half hat-trick from Gareth Bale.

Gomes' goalkeeping ability was called into question on 13 April 2011 in the second leg tie against Real Madrid after a long-shot from Cristiano Ronaldo slipped out of Gomes' hands over his head and into the goal to put Real Madrid 5–0 up on aggregate. Gomes took blame for another controversial goal against Chelsea on 30 April after a shot from Frank Lampard slipped between his legs and although Gomes scrambled back and appeared to clear the ball, the goal was allowed. Spurs went on to lose the game 2–1.

After several high-profile errors and misjudgements by Gomes, Tottenham signed 40-year-old keeper Brad Friedel on a free transfer from Aston Villa to provide competition in the first team. Friedel began the season as the starter with Gomes being relegated to the bench and later being left out of match day squads entirely, which led to immediate speculation regarding his future at the club. Gomes played his first match of the 2011–12 season in a League Cup defeat to Stoke City 6–7 in a penalty shoot-out after Massimo Luongo missed a penalty. Subsequently, Gomes played in the 2011–12 UEFA Europa League, keeping a clean sheet in the 1–0 victory over Rubin Kazan. Following Spurs' deadline day capture of goalkeeper Hugo Lloris from Lyon, Gomes slipped to fourth-choice at Spurs, but following the sale of Carlo Cudicini to the LA Galaxy, he rose back to third-choice, behind Lloris and Friedel.

==== Loan to 1899 Hoffenheim ====
On the final day of the January 2013 transfer window, Gomes agreed to join German Bundesliga side 1899 Hoffenheim on loan until the end of the season. On 2 February, he made his debut as Hoffenheim won 2–1 against SC Freiburg. After the match, manager Marco Kurz praised Gomes, saying, "Gomes has shown a very solid performance. Although he has only trained once with us, his aura was strong." Throughout the match, Gomes made four crucial saves and looked assured in claiming six crosses, commanding his penalty area. By his third match for Hoffenheim, he was already captaining the team, although his season ended prematurely when, on 6 April 2013, he broke his metacarpus during an important 3–0 home win over Fortuna Düsseldorf. He had to undergo hand surgery.

==== Return to Tottenham ====
After his injury, Gomes returned to Tottenham and started the 2013–14 season with Spurs. Gomes' role remained as third-choice, however, as the backup to Brad Friedel and the club number one Hugo Lloris. On 22 May 2014, Tottenham announced that Gomes would leave the club the following month when his contract expired.

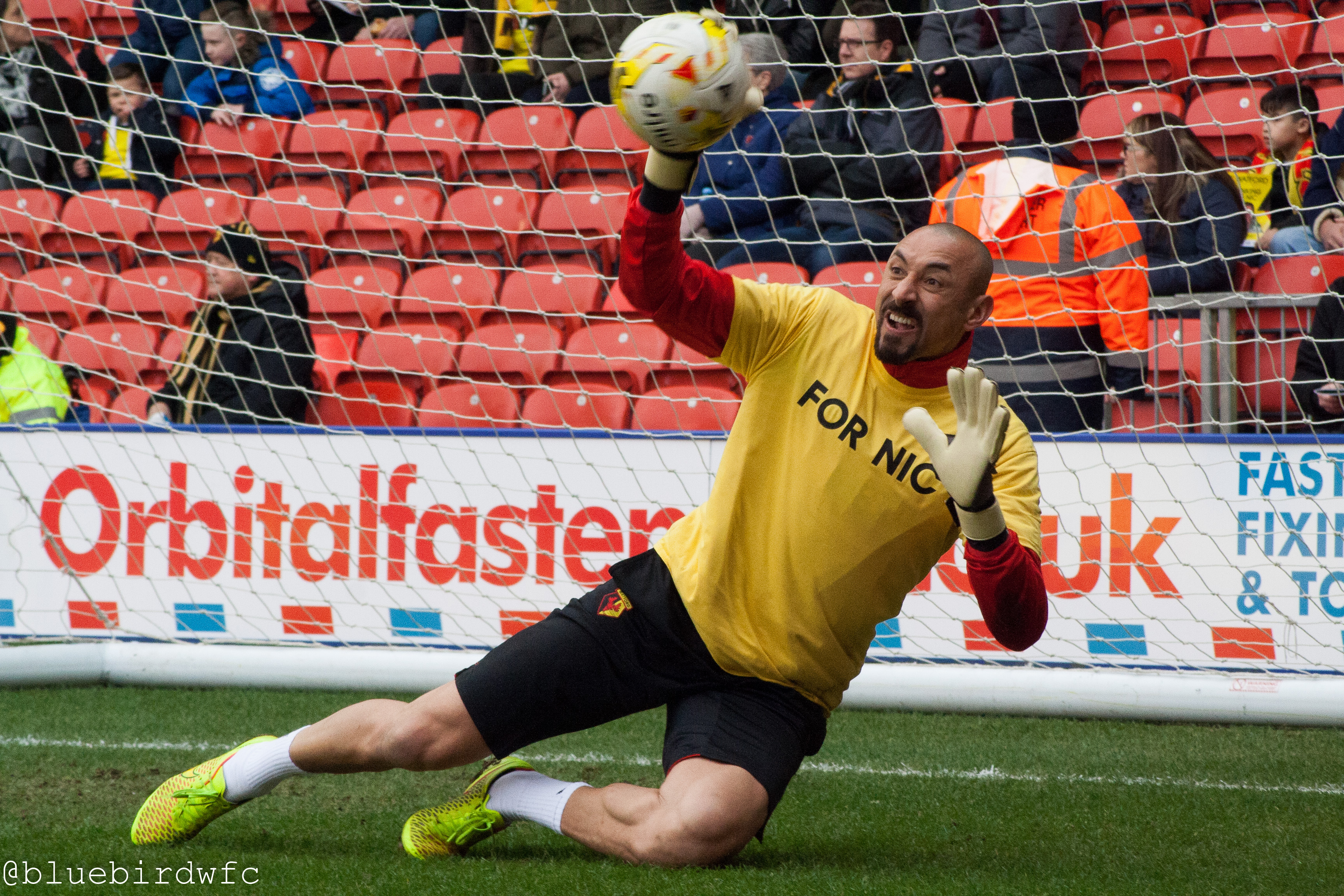
Gomes warming-up for Watford.

=== Watford ===
Gomes signed a one-year deal with Championship side Watford on 24 May 2014. The club retained the option to extend his contract by a further year. In his first season with the club Gomes played in 44 games helping the club gain automatic promotion to the Premier League.

Following the Hornets' promotion to the Premier League, Gomes signed a new three-year contract with Watford on 20 May 2015. On 16 April 2016, Gomes saved two penalties from Saido Berahino as Watford won 1–0 at West Bromwich Albion. Having played in every league game in 2015–16, he won the Player of the Season award at the end of the campaign and improved the terms of his contract. In 2016–17 he again started every league game as Watford retained their Premier League status. He lost his starting place to Orestis Karnezis for what proved to be Marco Silva's last match in charge of Watford on 20 January 2018 and did not return to the starting line-up until the final game of the 2017–18 season.

On 27 July 2020, Gomes confirmed on his Instagram that he would be leaving Watford after their relegation to the Championship. He confirmed his retirement in an interview with ESPN Brasil on 16 October, saying that he did not want to play for another club after Watford.

=== Democrata SL ===
Gomes returned to Brazil in June 2021 and signed for Democrata SL. He, however, left the club in July without making an appearance, after bureaucracy delayed his registration to the squad past the start of the Módulo II season.

== International career ==
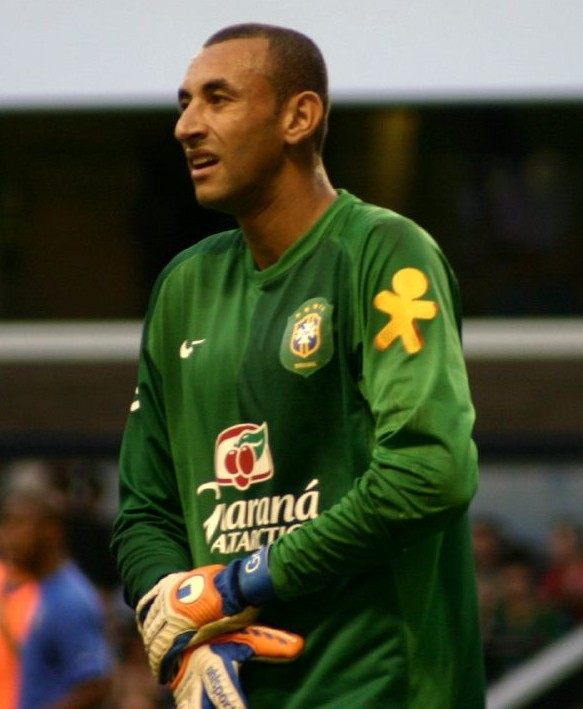
Gomes in an international friendly against Wales in 2006.

Gomes made his debut for Brazil in the 2003 CONCACAF Gold Cup. Although the competition is for senior national teams, Brazil chose to send an under-23 squad to the competition. Gomes made five appearances as Brazil went to the final and finished second after being beaten by Mexico 1–0.

Despite being part of the Brazilian squad that won the 2005 FIFA Confederations Cup as the third-choice keeper behind Dida and Marcos, Gomes did not receive any playing time. He was also excluded from Carlos Alberto Parreira's final 23-man roster for the 2006 FIFA World Cup in Germany.

It was not until his inclusion in the team for a series of late-summer friendlies, as a consequence of new Brazil coach Dunga's desire to play many of the Seleção's younger stars, that Gomes finally gained some consistent playing time in goal. On 14 August 2006, he was called up for a friendly against Norway, which ended in a 1–1 draw. On 3 September 2006, he played in Brazil's 3–0 win over rivals Argentina at Emirates Stadium in England. Two days later, Gomes kept a second consecutive clean sheet in a 2–0 victory over Wales at White Hart Lane. He also featured for the team in a 2–1 win over Ecuador on 10 October 2006.

On 11 May 2010, it was announced that Gomes would be part of the Brazilian squad which would compete at the 2010 World Cup in South Africa, alongside Júlio César and Doni. Gomes made a rare appearance for Brazil in a World Cup warm-up game, replacing Brazil's number one keeper Júlio César as a substitute.

== Personal life ==
Gomes has stated his intention to become a pastor and football agent. According to Gomes he had been offered coaching positions but turned them down saying that he felt it would not leave him time for his pastoral life, saying that he felt a call from God. Gomes was raised Catholic though has since converted to Pentecostalism.

Gomes is a supporter of Brazilian president Jair Bolsonaro, although he is not a committed right-winger and supported Lula and Dilma Rousseff of the Workers' Party in previous elections.

== Career statistics ==
=== Club ===
Appearances and goals by club, season and competition
Club	Season	League			National cup		League cup		Europe		Other		Total	
Club	Season	Division	Apps	Goals	Apps	Goals	Apps	Goals	Apps	Goals	Apps	Goals	Apps	Goals
Cruzeiro	2002	Brasileiro Série A	14	0	0	0	—		0	0	—		14	0
Cruzeiro	2003	Brasileiro Série A	40	0	11	0	—		14	0	—		65	0
Cruzeiro	2004	Brasileiro Série A	5	0	0	0	—		22	0	—		27	0
Cruzeiro	Total		59	0	11	0	—		36	0	—		106	0
PSV Eindhoven	2004–05	Eredivisie	30	0	3	0	—		11	0	—		44	0
PSV Eindhoven	2005–06	Eredivisie	32	0	4	0	—		8	0	1	0	45	0
PSV Eindhoven	2006–07	Eredivisie	32	0	3	0	—		10	0	0	0	45	0
PSV Eindhoven	2007–08	Eredivisie	34	0	1	0	—		12	0	1	0	48	0
PSV Eindhoven	Total		128	0	11	0	—		41	0	2	0	182	0
Tottenham Hotspur	2008–09	Premier League	34	0	1	0	0	0	8	0	—		43	0
Tottenham Hotspur	2009–10	Premier League	31	0	8	0	3	0	0	0	—		42	0
Tottenham Hotspur	2010–11	Premier League	30	0	1	0	0	0	10	0	—		41	0
Tottenham Hotspur	2011–12	Premier League	0	0	0	0	1	0	3	0	—		4	0
Tottenham Hotspur	2012–13	Premier League	0	0	0	0	0	0	0	0	—		0	0
Tottenham Hotspur	2013–14	Premier League	0	0	0	0	0	0	0	0	—		0	0
Tottenham Hotspur	Total		95	0	10	0	4	0	21	0	—		130	0
1899 Hoffenheim (loan)	2012–13	Bundesliga	9	0	0	0	—		—		—		9	0
Watford	2014–15	Championship	44	0	0	0	0	0	—		—		44	0
Watford	2015–16	Premier League	38	0	2	0	0	0	—		—		40	0
Watford	2016–17	Premier League	38	0	1	0	0	0	—		—		39	0
Watford	2017–18	Premier League	24	0	1	0	1	0	—		—		26	0
Watford	2018–19	Premier League	0	0	6	0	2	0	—		—		8	0
Watford	2019–20	Premier League	0	0	0	0	3	0	—		—		3	0
Watford	Total		144	0	8	0	6	0	—		—		160	0
Career total			435	0	40	0	10	0	98	0	2	0	587	0

=== International ===
Appearances and goals by national team and year
National team	Year	Apps	Goals
Brazil	2003	5	0
Brazil	2005	0	0
Brazil	2006	0	0
Brazil	2009	0	0
Brazil	2010	4	0
Brazil	2011	2	0
Total		11	0

== Honours ==
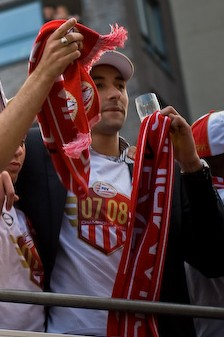
Gomes celebrates winning the 2007–08 Eredivisie with PSV

Cruzeiro

- Campeonato Brasileiro Série A: 2003
- Copa do Brasil: 2003
- Campeonato Mineiro: 2002, 2003, 2004

PSV

- Eredivisie: 2004–05, 2005–06, 2006–07, 2007–08
- KNVB Cup: 2004–05

Tottenham Hotspur

- Football League Cup runner-up: 2008–09

Watford

- Football League Championship runner-up: 2014–15
- FA Cup runner-up: 2018–19

Brazil

- FIFA Confederations Cup: 2005, 2009
- CONCACAF Gold Cup runner-up: 2003
