= Leslie Thompson =

Les, Leslie or Lesley Thompson may refer to:

- Leslie Thompson (skier) (born 1963), American cross country skier
- Leslie Thompson (musician) (1901–1987), Jamaican jazz trumpeter
- Leslie Thompson (cricketer) (1908–1990), English cricketer
- Leslie A. Thompson (1806–1874), Florida Supreme Court Justice
- Lesley Thompson (born 1959), Canadian coxswain
- Les Thompson (Australian footballer) (1928–2018), Australian footballer for Collingwood
- two English association football players:
  - Les Thompson (footballer, born 1968), played for Hull City, Scarborough, Maidstone United and Burnley
  - Les Thompson (footballer, born 1988), played for Stockport County

== See also ==
- Lesley Thomson (disambiguation)
