= 2004–05 Scottish Challenge Cup =

2004–05 Challenge Cup
Tournament details
- Country: Scotland
- Teams: 30

Final positions
- Champions: Falkirk
- Runners-up: Ross County

Tournament statistics
- Matches played: 29
- Goals scored: 86 (2.97 per match)

The 2004–2005 Scottish Challenge Cup was the 14th season of the competition, competed for by all 30 members of the Scottish Football League. The defending champions were Inverness Caledonian Thistle, who defeated Airdrie United 2–0 in the 2003 final. Inverness Caledonian Thistle did not compete in the tournament after being promoted to the Scottish Premier League.

The final was played on 7 November 2004, between Falkirk and Ross County, at McDiarmid Park, Perth. Falkirk won 2–1.

== Schedule ==
Round	First match date	Fixtures	Clubs
First round	Saturday 31 July 2004	14	30 → 16
Second round	Tuesday 31 August 2004	8	16 → 8
Quarter-finals	Tue/Wed 14/15 September 2004	4	8 → 4
Semi-finals	Tuesday 28 September 2004	2	4 → 2
Final	Sunday 7 November 2004	1	2 → 1

== First round ==
Clyde and Stranraer received random byes into the second round.

31 July 2004	Airdrie United	0–2	Queen of the South	New Broomfield, Airdrie
15:00		Report		Attendance: 1,481; Referee: M McCurry

31 July 2004	Alloa Athletic	2–0	Elgin City	Recreation Park, Alloa
15:00		Report		Attendance: 301; Referee: C Hardie

31 July 2004	Arbroath	2–4	Peterhead	Gayfield Park, Arbroath
15:00		Report		Attendance: 449; Referee: A Hunter

31 July 2004	Ayr United	0–3	Falkirk	Somerset Park, Ayr
15:00		Report		Attendance: 1,797; Referee: C Thomson

31 July 2004	Dumbarton	1–2	Stirling Albion	Strathclyde Homes Stadium, Dumbarton
15:00		Report		Attendance: 709; Referee: W Young

31 July 2004	East Fife	0 – 0 (a.e.t.) (3–4 p)	Cowdenbeath	Bayview Stadium, Methil
15:00		Report		Attendance: 468; Referee: T Brown

31 July 2004	East Stirlingshire	1–2	Berwick Rangers	Firs Park, Falkirk
15:00		Report		Attendance: 264; Referee: C Boyle

31 July 2004	Forfar Athletic	3–1	Greenock Morton	Station Park, Forfar
15:00		Report		Attendance: 752; Referee: C Murray

31 July 2004	Gretna	3–0	Montrose	Raydale Park, Gretna
15:00		Report		Attendance: 454

31 July 2004	Partick Thistle	3–0	Brechin City	Firhill Stadium, Glasgow
15:00		Report		Attendance: 1,803; Referee: I Fyfe

31 July 2004	Queen's Park	1 – 1 (a.e.t.) (4–2 p)	Stenhousemuir	Hampden Park, Glasgow
15:00		Report		Attendance: 461; Referee: E Smith

31 July 2004	Raith Rovers	0–2	Albion Rovers	Stark's Park, Kirkcaldy
15:00		Report		Attendance: 1,207; Referee: S Conroy

31 July 2004	Ross County	2–1	St Mirren	Victoria Park, Dingwall
15:00		Report		Attendance: 950; Referee: C MacKay

31 July 2004	St Johnstone	2–0	Hamilton Academical	McDiarmid Park, Perth
15:00		Report		Attendance: 1,850; Referee: D McDonald

Source: ESPN Soccernet

== Second round ==
31 August 2004	Albion Rovers	1–2	Partick Thistle	Cliftonhill, Coatbridge
19:30		Report		Attendance: 1,050; Referee: A Hunter

31 August 2004	Alloa Athletic	1–2	Berwick Rangers	Recreation Park
19:30		Report		Attendance: 268; Referee: D Somers

31 August 2004	Falkirk	5–3	Stirling Albion	Ochilview Park, Stenhousemuir
19:30		Report		Attendance: 2,631; Referee: C Richmond

31 August 2004	Forfar Athletic	2 – 2 (a.e.t.) (4–3 p)	Queen's Park	Station Park, Forfar
19:30		Report		Attendance: 421; Referee: A Freeland

31 August 2004	Peterhead	1–2	Ross County	Balmoor, Peterhead
19:30		Report		Attendance: 565; Referee: K Toner

31 August 2004	Clyde	1–0	Stranraer	Broadwood Stadium, Cumbernauld
19:45		Report		Attendance: 759; Referee: S Conroy

31 August 2004	Gretna	1–0	Cowdenbeath	Raydale Park, Gretna
19:45		Report		Attendance: 551; Referee: B Winter

31 August 2004	St Johnstone	3–0	Queen of the South	McDiarmid Park, Perth
19:45		Report		Attendance: 1,201; Referee: C Murray

Source: ESPN Soccernet

== Quarter-finals ==
14 September 2004
19:30

Falkirk	3–0	Gretna
Latapy 38'; Thomson 62'; Duffy 72'	Report

Ochilview Park, Stenhousemuir
Attendance: 1,416
Referee: H Dallas

14 September 2004
19:45

Berwick Rangers	0–1	St Johnstone
	Report	Moore 1'

Shielfield Park, Berwick-upon-Tweed
Attendance: 279
Referee: D McDonald

15 September 2004
19:45

Clyde	1–2	Forfar Athletic
Harty 9'; Mensing (red card) 70'	Report	Tosh 34'; McClune 72'

Broadwood Stadium, Cumbernauld
Attendance: 532

15 September 2004
19:45

Ross County	1 – 1 (a.e.t.) (5 – 3 pen.)	Partick Thistle
Winters 65'	Report	Panther 71'; Milne (red card) 3'

Victoria Park, Dingwall
Attendance: 1,050
Referee: A Freeland

== Semi-finals ==
28 September 2004
19:45

St Johnstone	1–2	Falkirk
Rutkiewicz 5'	Report	Duffy 9'; Lawrie 62'

McDiarmid Park, Perth
Attendance: 2,328
Referee: M McCurry

28 September 2004
19:45

Ross County	5–2	Forfar Athletic
Winters 18', 22', 65'; Burke 46'; Cowie	Report	Shields 7', 30'

Victoria Park, Dingwall
Attendance: 2,328
Referee: H Dallas

== Final ==
7 November 2004
15:00

Falkirk	2–1	Ross County
Scally 70'; Duffy 75'	Report	Winters 56'

McDiarmid Park, Perth
Attendance: 7,471
Referee: Kenny Clark
