= David Mathieson =

Scottish footballer

Personal information
- Date of birth: 18 January 1978 (age 48)
- Place of birth: Dumfries, Scotland
- Position: Goalkeeper

Youth career
- St.Mary's
- St Cuthbert Wanderers
- Maxwelltown Thistle
- Rangers

Senior career*
Years	Team	Apps	(Gls)
1994–1996	St Johnstone	0	(0)
1996–2001	Queen of the South	112	(0)
2001–2008	Gretna	105	(0)

International career
1997–1999	Scotland U21	3	(0)
- * Club domestic league appearances and goals

David Mathieson (born 18 January 1978) is a Scottish retired professional footballer who played as a goalkeeper for Queen of the South and Gretna and made three appearances for Scotland under-21s.

== Queen of the South ==
David Mathieson joined Queen of the South in 1996 with new chairman Norman Blount getting the wheels moving on the club's revival.

In 1997 Queen of the South reached the Scottish Challenge Cup final for the first time. Second Division Queens lost 1-0 to 1st Division Falkirk despite a rousing Queens display at Motherwell's Fir Park; a performance that included the man of the match award going to Queens veteran central midfield playmaker Tommy Bryce and an early career appearance for Jamie McAllister. A late chance for a Derek Townsley equaliser went agonisingly over for Queens. David Mathieson played in goals for Queens.

At the end of season 1998-99 David Mathieson was the Queen of the South fan club player of the year. While at Queen of the South David Mathieson gained 3 Scotland under 21 caps. The opponents were Latvia, Colombia and Germany. Mathieson left Palmerston Park in 2001 after five seasons.

== Gretna ==
After leaving Palmerston Park he rejoined the former Queens player and manager, Rowan Alexander who was now the manager of non-league club Gretna. Gretna however successfully applied for admission to the Scottish League in 2002. The club were soon taken over by millionaire Brooks Mileson. Bank-rolled by Mileson, Gretna embarked upon an ambitious recruitment strategy. With high calibre players for the division on board, Mathieson picked up the 2005 Scottish Third Division championship. Mathieson then found himself out of favour when the club signed former St Johnstone goalkeeper Alan Main. Mathieson only had four appearances in season 2005-06 and his final appearance was in the Scottish Challenge Cup, early in season 2006-07.

== Coaching career ==
In February 2022, Mathieson was appointed Queen of the South's goalkeeping coach. This was after Ross Ballantyne departed the Doonhamers alongside the management team of Allan Johnston and Sandy Clark.

== Honours ==
- Queen of the South — 1997 Scottish Challenge Cup Final Runner Up
- Gretna — 2004–05 Scottish Third Division Winner
