= Alex Lowe =

Alex Lowe may refer to:

- Alex Lowe (mountaineer) (1958–1999), American mountaineer
- Alex Lowe (actor) (born 1968), English actor
- Alex Lowe, singer/guitarist with Hurricane No. 1
- Alex Lowe (American Horror Story), a character in American Horror Story: Hotel

== See also ==
- Alexander Low (disambiguation)
- Alex Lowes, English motorcycle racer
