= Lesley Thomson =

Lesley Thomson may refer to:

- Lesley Thompson, rower
- Lesley Thomson (lawyer), Solicitor General for Scotland
- Lesley Thomson (novelist) (born 1958), English novelist and creative writing tutor
- Les Thomson, footballer, see List of Falkirk F.C. players
- Leslie Thomson (died 1966), member of the Kansas House of Representatives

== See also ==
- Leslie Thompson (disambiguation)
