= Ken Eadie =

Scottish footballer

Personal information
- Full name: Kenneth William Eadie
- Date of birth: 26 February 1961 (age 65)
- Place of birth: Paisley, Scotland
- Position: Striker

Youth career
- Johnstone Thistle

Senior career*
Years	Team	Apps	(Gls)
1980–1983	Kilmarnock	26	(4)
1983–1986	Brechin City	89	(44)
1986–1987	Falkirk	52	(9)
1987–1996	Clydebank	276	(149)
1996–1997	Airdrieonians	15	(7)
1997–2000	Queen of the South	52	(17)
Total		510	(230)

Managerial career
- 1999–2000: Queen of the South
- * Club domestic league appearances and goals

Kenneth William Eadie (born 26 February 1961 in Paisley) is a Scottish retired footballer who played for, amongst others, Clydebank, Airdrieonians and Queen of the South during his career.

== Career ==
Eadie played as a striker and spent the longest part of his playing career with Clydebank, hitting 149 goals on his 276 league games; he is the club's all-time leading scorer. Eadie won the 'Daily Record Golden Boot' in 1991, clinching it on the final day of the season with 4 second half strikes in a 7–1 victory over Partick Thistle at New Kilbowie Park which saw him pip Gordon Dalziel and finish the season with 30 goals. Eadie was inducted into the Clydebank Hall of Fame alongside Jim Fallon, Jim Gallacher and Davie Cooper.

Included amongst his time at Queen of the South, Eadie was joint manager along with George Rowe. The management of the pair helped turn round a difficult first season, thanks in large part to the performances of then youngsters Jamie McAllister and David Lilley.

== See also ==
- List of footballers in Scotland by number of league appearances (500+)
- List of footballers in Scotland by number of league goals (200+)
