= 1993–94 Scottish Challenge Cup =

Tournament details
- Country: Scotland
- Teams: 26

Final positions
- Champions: Falkirk
- Runners-up: St Mirren

Tournament statistics
- Matches played: 25
- Goals scored: 83 (3.32 per match)

The 1993–94 Scottish Challenge Cup was the fourth season of the competition, which was also known as the B&Q Cup for sponsorship reasons. It was competed for by the 26 clubs in the Scottish Football League Division One and Two. The defending champions were Hamilton Academical, who defeated Morton 3–2 in the 1992 final; and lost 3–1 in the Second round to Airdrieonians.

The final was played on 12 December 1993, between Falkirk and St Mirren at Fir Park in Motherwell. Falkirk won 3–0, to win the tournament for the first time.

== Schedule ==
Round	First match date	Fixtures	Clubs
First round	Wed/Thu 6/7 October 1993	10	26 → 16
Second round	Tue/Wed 19/20 October 1993	8	16 → 8
Quarter-finals	Tue/Wed 26/27 October 1993	4	8 → 4
Semi-finals	Tuesday 2 November 1993	2	4 → 2
Final	Sunday 12 December 1993	1	2 → 1

== First round ==
Airdrieonians, Dunfermline Athletic, Hamilton Academical, Morton, Queen's Park and Stirling Albion entered the second round.

6 October 1993	Albion Rovers	2 – 2* (a.e.t.)	Cowdenbeath	Cliftonhill, Coatbridge
			Cowdenbeath won on penalties

6 October 1993	Ayr United	3–1	East Fife	Somerset Park, Ayr

6 October 1993	Dumbarton	1–2	Stranraer	Boghead Park, Dumbarton

7 October 1993	Brechin City	3 – 1 (a.e.t.)	Arbroath	Glebe Park, Brechin

7 October 1993	Clyde	0–1	St Mirren	Douglas Park, Hamilton

7 October 1993	Falkirk	2–1	Alloa Athletic	Brockville Park, Falkirk

7 October 1993	Forfar Athletic	2 – 3 (a.e.t.)	Meadowbank Thistle	Station Park, Forfar

7 October 1993	Montrose	5–0	East Stirlingshire	Links Park, Montrose

7 October 1993	Queen of the South	2–1	Berwick Rangers	Palmerston Park, Dumfries

7 October 1993	Stenhousemuir	0–5	Clydebank	Ochilview Park, Stenhousemuir

Source: SFL

== Second round ==
19 October 1993	Airdrieonians	3–1	Hamilton Academical	Broomfield Park, Airdrie

19 October 1993	Ayr United	2 – 1 (a.e.t.)	Brechin City	Somerset Park, Ayr

19 October 1993	Falkirk	3–0	Cowdenbeath	Brockville Park, Falkirk

19 October 1993	Morton	2–4	St Mirren	Cappielow, Greenock

19 October 1993	Queen's Park	0–1	Clydebank	Hampden Park, Glasgow

20 October 1993	Meadowbank Thistle	2–0	Stirling Albion	Meadowbank Stadium, Edinburgh

20 October 1993	Montrose	0* – 0 (a.e.t.)	Stranraer	Links Park, Montrose
	Montrose won on penalties

20 October 1993	Queen of the South	0–6	Dunfermline Athletic	Palmerston Park, Dumfries

Source: SFL

== Quarter-finals ==
26 October 1993

Airdrieonians	0 – 1 (a.e.t.)	St Mirren

Broomfield Park, Airdrie

26 October 1993

Ayr United	2–0	Clydebank

Somerset Park, Ayr

27 October 1993

Falkirk	4–1	Dunfermline Athletic

Brockville Park, Falkirk

27 October 1993

Meadowbank Thistle	1 – 1 (a.e.t.)	Montrose
Meadowbank Thistle won on penalties

Meadowbank Stadium, Edinburgh

== Semi-finals ==
2 November 1993

Ayr United	1–2	St Mirren

Somerset Park, Ayr

2 November 1993

Falkirk	3–2	Meadowbank Thistle

Brockville Park, Falkirk

== Final ==
12 December 1993
15:00

Falkirk	3–0	St Mirren
Duffy; Cadette; Hughes	Report

Fir Park, Motherwell
Attendance: 13,763
Referee: D. Hope
