= Greg Shaw (footballer) =

Scottish footballer

Personal information
- Date of birth: 15 February 1970 (age 56)
- Place of birth: Dumfries, Scotland
- Position: Forward

Youth career
- Dalbeattie Star

Senior career*
Years	Team	Apps	(Gls)
1988–1992	Ayr United	58	(10)
1992–1995	Falkirk	37	(12)
1995–1998	Dunfermline Athletic	37	(11)
1998	Airdrieonians	2	(0)
1998	Clydebank	6	(0)
1998–1999	Berwick Rangers	21	(4)
Total		161	(37)
- * Club domestic league appearances and goals

Greg Shaw (born 15 February 1970) is a Scottish former footballer who played over 160 league games for Ayr United, Falkirk, Dunfermline Athletic, Airdrieonians, Clydebank and Berwick Rangers mostly in the 1990s. Shaw played as a forward.

His son, Oli Shaw, is also a footballer.

== Honours ==
Falkirk

- Scottish Challenge Cup: 1993–94
