= Thomas Scott (footballer, born 1895) =

Scottish footballer

Personal information
- Full name: Thomas Scott
- Date of birth: 6 July 1895
- Place of birth: Crieff, Scotland
- Date of death: 15 September 1976 (aged 81)
- Place of death: Denny, Scotland
- Height: 5 ft 8 in (1.73 m)
- Position: Right back

Senior career*
Years	Team	Apps	(Gls)
–	Denny Hibernian		
1917–1929	Falkirk	387	(15)
1929–1930	Morton	23	(0)
Total		410	(15)

International career
1922	Scottish League XI	1	(0)
- * Club domestic league appearances and goals

Thomas Scott (6 July 1895 – 15 September 1976) was a Scottish footballer who played as a right back, primarily for Falkirk, where he spent 12 years and was the club's regular penalty taker for much of that time (anecdotally it is reported that when such a kick was awarded he would jog up from his defensive position to the penalty spot and strike the ball at goal without pausing).

Scott was selected once for the Scottish Football League XI (goalkeeper Thomas Ferguson, his Falkirk teammate for a decade, also played in that match), and was a member of a Scottish Football Association party which toured North America in 1927, but never received a full cap for Scotland.

He was also an accomplished golfer, challenging for the club championship at his local course.
