= Brian Hetherston =

Scottish footballer

Personal information
- Date of birth: 23 November 1976
- Place of birth: Bellshill, Scotland
- Date of death: 5 March 2006 (aged 29)
- Place of death: Coatbridge, Scotland
- Position: Midfielder

Youth career
- St Mirren

Senior career*
Years	Team	Apps	(Gls)
1992–1998	St Mirren	64	(6)
1998–2000	Sligo Rovers		
2000–2001	Raith Rovers	19	(0)
Total		83	(6)

International career
1996	Scotland U21	1	(0)
- * Club domestic league appearances and goals

Brian Hetherston (23 November 1976 – 5 March 2006) was a Scottish professional footballer who played as a midfielder. His brother is Peter Hetherston.

== Career ==
Born in Bellshill, Hetherston played in Scotland and Ireland for St Mirren, Sligo Rovers and Raith Rovers.

== Later life and death ==
Hetherston retired from professional football after sustaining kidney and lung damage following an epileptic seizure; he died following another seizure on 5 March 2006.
