= Alexander Low =

Alexander Low may refer to:

- Alexander Low (British Army officer) (1817–1904), general
- Alexander Low, Lord Low (1845–1910), Scottish judge
- Alex Low (fl. 1933), Scottish footballer
