= William Davidson (Scottish footballer) =

Scottish footballer

Personal information
- Date of birth: c. 1883 (Note: Other sources suggest 1888, but this would have made him 15 when starting to play for Queen's Park, not impossible but unlikely.)
- Place of birth: Glasgow, Scotland
- Position: Outside left

Senior career*
Years	Team	Apps	(Gls)
1904–1906	Queen's Park	21	(9)
1906–1910	Falkirk	110	(9)
1910	Airdrieonians	14	(3)
1910–1911	Middlesbrough	16	(0)
1911–1913	Everton	38	(3)
1913–1915	St Mirren	15	(3)
Total		204	(27)
- * Club domestic league appearances and goals

William Davidson (born c. 1883) was a Scottish footballer who played as an outside left, featuring for Queen's Park, Falkirk, Airdrieonians and St Mirren in the Scottish Football League, and for Middlesbrough and Everton in the English Football League, competing exclusively in the top division of both systems.

He was a member of the Falkirk teams that finished league runners-up in the 1907–08 and 1909–10 seasons, and experienced the same fate with Everton in 1911–12. He came from a well-off background and chose to play as an amateur for much of his career, a freedom which allowed him to join the Pilgrims exhibition team which toured North America in the autumn of 1909 before going back to Falkirk.
