= Les Thompson (Australian footballer) =

Australian rules footballer (1928–2018)

Personal information
- Full name: Les Thompson
- Born: 30 April 1928
- Died: 25 July 2018 (aged 90)
- Original team: Korumburra
- Height: 178 cm (5 ft 10 in)
- Weight: 79.5 kg (175 lb)

Playing career^{1}
| Years | Club | Games (Goals) |
| 1949–50 | Collingwood | 9 (0) |
- ^{1} Playing statistics correct to the end of 1950.

Les Thompson (30 April 1928 – 25 July 2018) was an Australian rules footballer who played with Collingwood in the Victorian Football League (VFL).
