= Paul McIntyre (footballer) =

Scottish footballer

Paul McIntyre (born 24 November 1987) is a Scottish former footballer, who played for Ayr United, St Mirren, Stranraer, Clydebank in the Scottish Football League.
