= Andy Aitken (footballer, born 1978) =

Scottish footballer

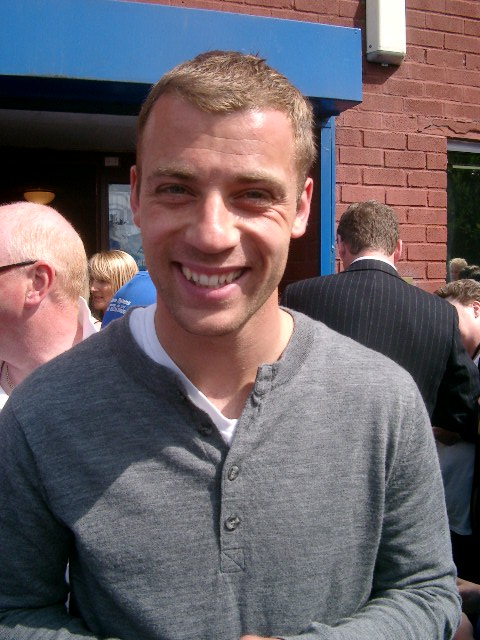

Personal information
- Full name: Andrew Robert Aitken
- Date of birth: 2 February 1978 (age 48)
- Place of birth: Dumfries, Scotland
- Height: 6 ft 1 in (1.85 m)
- Position: Defender

Senior career*
Years	Team	Apps	(Gls)
1996–2004	Queen of the South	237	(4)
2004–2006	Gretna	41	(2)
2006–2009	Queen of the South	54	(0)
2009–2010	Ayr United	22	(1)
2010–2013	Annan Athletic	21	(0)
2013	Celtic Nation	2	(0)
- * Club domestic league appearances and goals as of 7 March 2011

Andrew Robert Aitken (born 2 February 1978) is a Scottish former professional footballer who made over 300 appearances for Queen of the South. A left sided defender, he also played for Gretna and Ayr United. Andrew now works as a first team coach at Annan Athletic.

== Career ==
Aitken joined a Queen of the South in 1996 with new chairman Norman Blount getting the wheels moving on the club's revival. In 1997 Queen of the South reached the Scottish Challenge Cup final for the first time. Second Division Queens lost 1–0 to 1st Division Falkirk despite a rousing Queens display at Motherwell's Fir Park; a performance that included the man of the match award going to Queens veteran central midfield playmaker Tommy Bryce and an early career appearance for Jamie McAllister. A late chance for a Derek Townsley equaliser went agonisingly over for Queens.

Aitken spent two seasons at Gretna playing during the reign of Brooks Mileson. Aitken returned to Palmerston Park & immediately brought some pace to the defence. In combination with Stuart Lovell and Jim Thomson the Annan native managed to secure one of the tightest defences in the league over the last three months of last season. In pre-season 2006, Aitken sustained a knee ligament injury in a friendly match 3–0 victory away against Coleraine on 22 July that meant a lengthy spell on the treatment table.

Andy Aitken was a mainstay of the Queens side that made it to final of the 2008 Scottish Cup Final, where they faced Rangers. The Doonhamers lost 3–2. His appearances for Queen of the South have placed him 15th within the club's record appearances list. Along with Jim Thomson they are the only Queens players to earn four senior Scottish football medals while playing for the club – (winners of the 2001/02 Second Division and 2002/03 Scottish Challenge Cup; runners up in the 1997/98 Scottish Challenge Cup and 2007/08 Scottish Cup).

Aitken joined Ayr United in the 2009 close season. His time there was impacted by an injury that was to keep him out for nine weeks ironically sustained against QoS at Palmerston. At the end of the 2009-10 season rejoined Annan Athletic who had by now joined the Scottish Football League. He became Assistant Manager after the departure of Derek Townsley, Aitken's ex teammate from the '97 Challenge Cup Final team..

He had a spell at Carlisle based Celtic Nation in 2013.
