= Tony Parks =

English footballer & coach (born 1963)

Personal information
- Full name: Anthony Parks
- Date of birth: 28 January 1963 (age 63)
- Place of birth: Hackney, England
- Height: 5 ft 10 in (1.78 m)
- Position: Goalkeeper

Youth career
- Tottenham Hotspur

Senior career*
Years	Team	Apps	(Gls)
1980–1988	Tottenham Hotspur	37	(0)
1986	→ Oxford United (loan)	5	(0)
1987	→ Gillingham (loan)	2	(0)
1988–1990	Brentford	71	(0)
1990	→ Queens Park Rangers (loan)	0	(0)
1990–1991	Fulham	2	(0)
1991–1992	West Ham United	6	(0)
1992	Stoke City	2	(0)
1992–1996	Falkirk	112	(0)
1996–1997	Blackpool	0	(0)
1997–1998	Burnley	0	(0)
1998	→ Doncaster Rovers (loan)	6	(0)
1998–1999	Barrow		
1999	Scarborough	15	(0)
1999–2002	Halifax Town	6	(0)

Managerial career
- 2000: Halifax Town (caretaker manager)
- 2001: Halifax Town (caretaker manager)
- * Club domestic league appearances and goals

Anthony Parks (born 28 January 1963) is an English football coach and former professional footballer who played as a goalkeeper. In a career spanning over 20 years, he was on the books of 15 different clubs, making more than 250 league appearances and won the 1983–84 UEFA Cup with Tottenham Hotspur. After retiring as a player he had two spells as joint caretaker manager of Halifax Town.

== Career ==
Parks was born in Hackney, London, and began his football career with Tottenham Hotspur. Though never a first-team regular, he was on the winning side in the 1984 UEFA Cup Final, in which he saved the final penalty from Anderlecht's Arnór Guðjohnsen in the penalty shootout. While still at Tottenham he had loan spells at fellow First Division club Oxford United and third-tier Gillingham.

Following his departure from Spurs in 1988 he signed for Third Division side Brentford, for whom he played 71 league games. In the 1990–91 season he was loaned to Queens Park Rangers in the First Division and subsequently joined third-tier side Fulham. Spells at West Ham United and Stoke City followed before he started a four-season spell at Scottish side Falkirk. After leaving them in 1996, his career concluded with spells at Blackpool, Burnley, Doncaster Rovers, Barrow, Scarborough and Halifax Town.

After his playing career ended, Parks went on to work as a goalkeeping coach. He held roles at several clubs and also worked with the England youth teams for the Football Association. In November 2008, he returned to Tottenham, succeeding Hans Leitert as goalkeeping coach.

In June 2016, Parks was released from his position of goalkeeping coach by Aston Villa. Prior to the 2018–19 season, Parks was employed as Head of Academy Goalkeeping at Watford. However, he left the club in September 2018 to set up "Tony Parks Goalkeeping" offering private coaching and Coach Education.

== Career statistics ==
Appearances and goals by club, season and competition
Club	Season	League			FA Cup		League Cup		Other		Total	
Club	Season	Division	Apps	Goals	Apps	Goals	Apps	Goals	Apps	Goals	Apps	Goals
Tottenham Hotspur	1981–82	First Division	2	0	0	0	0	0	0	0	2	0
Tottenham Hotspur	1982–83	First Division	1	0	0	0	0	0	1 (Note: Appearance in European Cup Winners' Cup)	0	2	0
Tottenham Hotspur	1983–84	First Division	16	0	3	0	0	0	5 (Note: Appearance in UEFA Cup)	0	24	0
Tottenham Hotspur	1984–85	First Division	0	0	0	0	0	0	0	0	0	0
Tottenham Hotspur	1985–86	First Division	0	0	0	0	0	0	0	0	0	0
Tottenham Hotspur	1986–87	First Division	2	0	0	0	0	0	0	0	2	0
Tottenham Hotspur	1987–88	First Division	16	0	2	0	1	0	0	0	19	0
Tottenham Hotspur	Total		37	0	5	0	1	0	6	0	49	0
Oxford United (loan)	1986–87	First Division	5	0	0	0	0	0	0	0	5	0
Gillingham (loan)	1987–88	Third Division	2	0	0	0	0	0	0	0	2	0
Brentford	1988–89	Third Division	33	0	7	0	3	0	2 (Note: Appearances in Football League Trophy)	0	45	0
Brentford	1989–90	Third Division	37	0	1	0	4	0	3	0	45	0
Brentford	1990–91	Third Division	1	0	0	0	0	0	0	0	1	0
Brentford	Total		71	0	8	0	7	0	5	0	91	0
Queens Park Rangers (loan)	1990–91	First Division	0	0	0	0	0	0	0	0	0	0
Fulham	1990–91	Third Division	2	0	0	0	0	0	0	0	2	0
West Ham United	1991–92	First Division	6	0	3	0	0	0	0	0	9	0
Stoke City	1992–93	Second Division	2	0	0	0	1	0	0	0	3	0
Blackpool	1996–97	Second Division	0	0	0	0	0	0	0	0	0	0
Burnley	1997–98	Second Division	0	0	0	0	0	0	0	0	0	0
Burnley	1998–99	Second Division	0	0	0	0	2	0	0	0	2	0
Burnley	Total		0	0	0	0	2	0	0	0	2	0
Doncaster Rovers (loan)	1997–98	Third Division	6	0	0	0	0	0	0	0	6	0
Scarborough	1998–99	Third Division	15	0	0	0	0	0	0	0	15	0
Halifax Town	1999–2000	Third Division	1	0	0	0	2	0	0	0	3	0
Halifax Town	2000–01	Third Division	5	0	0	0	1	0	0	0	6	0
Halifax Town	Total		6	0	0	0	3	0	0	0	9	0
Career total			152	0	16	0	14	0	11	0	193	0

== Honours ==
=== Club ===
Tottenham Hotspur;

- UEFA Cup: 1983–84

Falkirk

- Scottish Challenge Cup: 1993–94
