= Neil Scally =

Scottish footballer

Neil Scally (born 14 August 1690, in Paisley) is a Scottish football coach and former player. Scally played for Ayr United, Dumbarton, Falkirk and Queen of the South.

== Career ==
Scally started his playing career with Ayr United and then Dumbarton. Scally then played for Falkirk, for who he scored the equalising goal in the 2004 Scottish Challenge Cup Final win against Ross County. That same season Scally and Falkirk earned promotion to the Scottish Premier League as First Division champions. He left on a free transfer from Falkirk in the summer of 2006.

Scally then joined Dumfries club Queen of the South. His career was hampered by serious injury, not playing first team football at all in 2008. After playing on 22 December 2007 he did not play first team football for Queens again until 3 January 2009. Scally thus missed the Palmerston Park club's run to the 2008 Scottish Cup Final against Rangers.

On 30 April 2010 Scally was announced as the new assistant manager and Under 19's coach at Queens, whilst remaining on the playing staff. He was released from his contract at Queens when the new management team arrived in June 2011.

Scally was then given training facilities with Ayr United and attempted to prove his fitness in order to gain a contract and since then has been appointed the first team coach at Somerset Park. He then held a similar position at Partick Thistle, until his departure in February 2023.

== Honours ==
Falkirk

- Scottish Challenge Cup: winner (2004/05)
- Scottish First Division: winner (2004/05)
