= Andy Seaton =

Scottish footballer

Personal information
- Date of birth: 16 September 1977 (age 49)
- Place of birth: Edinburgh, Scotland
- Height: 5 ft 10 in (1.78 m)
- Position: Left back

Youth career
- Stoneyburn

Senior career*
Years	Team	Apps	(Gls)
1996–2001	Falkirk	112	(0)
2001–2004	Alloa Athletic	80	(10)
2004–2005	Berwick Rangers	31	(3)
2005–2007	Penicuik Athletic		
2007–2011	West Calder United		
Total		223	(13)

International career
1997	Scotland U21	1	(0)
- * Club domestic league appearances and goals

Andrew Seaton (born 16 September 1977) is a Scottish former footballer, who played as a defender for Falkirk, Alloa Athletic and Berwick Rangers.
