= Gordon Connelly =

Scottish footballer

Personal information
- Full name: Gordon Paul John Connelly
- Date of birth: 1 November 1976 (age 49)
- Place of birth: Glasgow, Scotland
- Position: Forward

Senior career*
Years	Team	Apps	(Gls)
1995–1998	Airdrieonians	33	(1)
1998–1999	York City	28	(4)
1999–2000	Southend United	42	(2)
2000–2001	Carlisle United	28	(2)
2001–2002	Queen of the South	30	(1)
2002–2006	Berwick Rangers	104	(8)
2006–2007	Stenhousemuir	5	(0)
Total		270	(18)
- * Club domestic league appearances and goals

Gordon Paul John Connelly (born 1 November 1976) is a Scottish professional footballer, who played as a forward for several teams in the Football League.
