= Leslie Thompson (cricketer) =

English cricketer

Leslie Baines Thompson (12 November 1908 – 23 April 1990) was an English first-class cricketer active 1933–51 who played for Middlesex. He was born in Brentford; died in Canada.
