= Norman Blount =

Scottish businessman

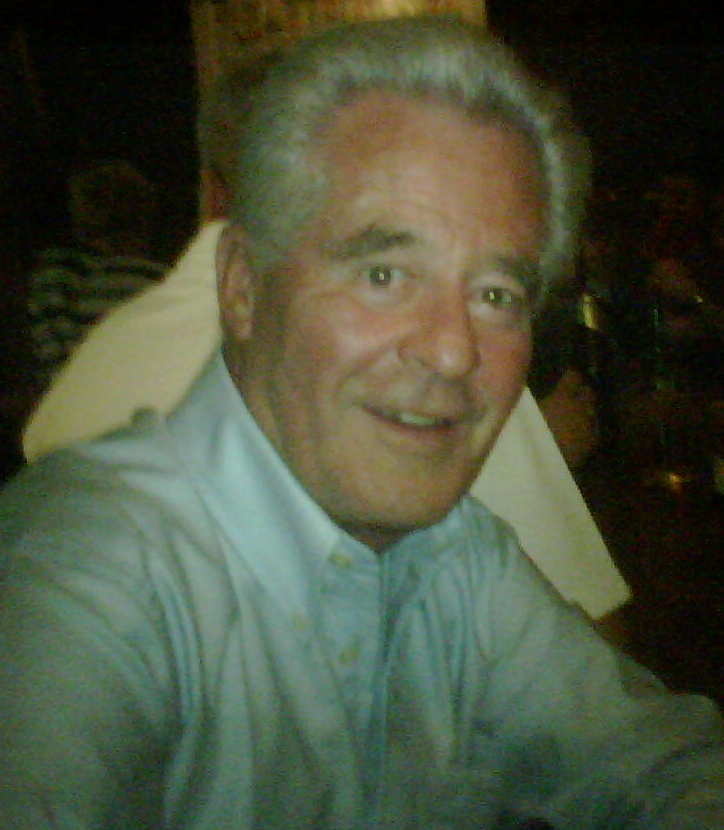
Norman Blount in Copenhagen, 24 August 2008

Norman Blount is the Scottish former chairman of Queen of the South football club. Blount was instrumental as the new broom that swept through the Dumfries club in the mid and late 90s replacing the previous regime under which the club had gone into stagnation and decline from the late 1960s. Blount was the first of the three chairman who combined have rebuilt Queens to the position the club is in today.

== Pre Queens ==
Norman Blount was owner of a successful pharmacy business in Dumfries. His son Mark was part of the Queen of the South youth team that made the 1986 BP Youth Cup final against Aberdeen. The Queens side had beaten Celtic on the way to the final.

== Queens chairman ==
Norman Blount became chairman of Queen of the South in April 1994. Very quickly new ideas came along that showed that the club was in a new era:-

- The new stand was built within 1 year of Blount becoming chairman
- The club became the first senior club in the UK to establish a club museum
- Queen of the South became the first club in the world to deploy astro turf on the outside of the touch line on a grass pitch (for linesmen to run along). Initially the Scottish Football Association agreed to this as a 12-month experiment. However, such was the success of the astro turf that the SFA brought the experiment to an early close and sanctioned use of this idea for any other club interested
- The first senior club in the UK to use a lottery scheme to decide the annual shirt sponsor. Such was the success of the idea that the club became inundated with calls from other clubs enquiring on the best way to set such a scheme up

The highlight on the pitch of the Blount regime was Queens making it to the final of the Scottish Challenge Cup for the first time. This was in 1997 where a battling Queens side lost out by 1-0 to Falkirk. Man of the match was Queens' Tommy Bryce. However in November 1999 Blount candidly announced that he felt that he had taken the club as far as he could and resigned from being chairman.

Two time divisional player of the year Andy Thomson was transferred for a Queens record fee of £250,000 in 1994. As Thomson was to say on his return over a decade later, "Things have changed quite a bit while I've been away - a new stand, a completely new set-up and a more modern type of training system". Thomson added, "Norman Blount was an excellent chairman."

Players to have signed for Queens during the Blount regime include Jamie McAllister, Derek Townsley, Jim Thomson, David Lilley, David Mathieson and Andy Aitken. In a later interview for the club website reflecting on his time at Queens McAllister said, "Norman Blount, the chairman at the time was different class".

== Queens after Blount ==
The chairmanship was taken over by Ronnie Bradford who continued the progressive ambition started under Blount. Bradford left due to ill health in June 2003. It has been under Bradford and then succeeding chairman Davie Rae that the seeds sown by Blount have really come to fruition on the pitch. Since the turn of the millennium Queens have enjoyed both league and cup success by:-

- Winning the 2001-02 Scottish Second Division to return to the top half of Scottish football
- Winning the 2002-03 Scottish Challenge Cup
- Progressing to the 2006-07 Scottish Cup quarter final before losing 2-1 to Hibernian
- Usurping the 2006-07 Scottish Cup run by progressing beyond the quarter-finals and then eliminating Aberdeen in the 2007-08 semi final. In the club's first ever Scottish Cup final Queens went down 3-2 to Rangers but still qualified for the 2nd qualification round of the UEFA Cup.

== Retirement ==
Norman Blount enjoys his retirement playing golf and watching Queens as a spectator. He was among the Queens fans to make the trip in August 2008 to see Queens in the UEFA Cup 2nd qualification round game away to FC Nordsjælland in Denmark. Blount is among the organisers in the events for the Queen of the South testimonial season of Andy Aitken.
