= Paul McGrillen =

Scottish footballer

Personal information
- Full name: Paul McGrillen
- Date of birth: 19 August 1971
- Place of birth: Glasgow, Scotland
- Date of death: 29 July 2009 (aged 37)
- Place of death: Hamilton, Scotland
- Position: Striker

Senior career*
Years	Team	Apps	(Gls)
1990–1995	Motherwell	87	(13)
1995–1998	Falkirk	80	(20)
1998–1999	Airdrieonians	23	(1)
1999	East Fife	3	(1)
1999–2000	Stirling Albion	29	(11)
2000–2001	Partick Thistle	19	(6)
2001–2002	Clydebank	33	(7)
2004–2006	Stenhousemuir	65	(33)
2006–2007	Bellshill Athletic		
2007	Stranraer	8	(1)
2008–2009	Bathgate Thistle		

International career
1993	Scotland U21	2	(0)

Managerial career
- 2006–2007: Bellshill Athletic
- * Club domestic league appearances and goals

Paul McGrillen (19 August 1971 – 29 July 2009) was a Scottish footballer who played as a striker for clubs including Motherwell, Falkirk, Airdrieonians and East Fife in the Scottish leagues. After retiring from senior football, he played in the Scottish minor leagues and was playing for Bathgate Thistle as this level when he died by suicide in July 2009, when aged 37.

== Career ==
McGrillen spent his early career with Motherwell, being part of Motherwell's Scottish Cup-winning squad in 1991 (although not appearing in the Final itself), while also winning the Scottish Challenge Cup with Falkirk in 1997–98. Following his departure from Brockville in 1998, McGrillen began a series of spells with lower league clubs, taking up a player/manager role with Bellshill Athletic between 2006 and 2007. In 2008, McGrillen won the Scottish Junior Cup with his final club Bathgate.

On 11 September 2008, McGrillen played for a Motherwell side in Dougie Arnott's belated testimonial match against an Old Firm select.

== Death ==
McGrillen was found dead at his home in Hamilton on 29 July 2009, as a result of suicide by hanging, but without leaving a note.

== Honours ==
Motherwell

- Scottish Cup: 1

1990–91

Falkirk

- Scottish Challenge Cup: 1

1997–98

Bathgate

- Scottish Junior Cup: 1

2007–08
