= Neil Oliver (footballer) =

English footballer

Personal information
- Date of birth: 11 April 1967 (age 59)
- Place of birth: Berwick-upon-Tweed, England
- Position: Full-back

Senior career*
Years	Team	Apps	(Gls)
- Coldstream
1985–1989	Berwick Rangers	93	(0)
1989–1991	Blackburn Rovers	6	(0)
1991–1999	Falkirk	170	(3)
1998–1999	Hamilton Academical	6	(0)
1999–2000	Clydebank	18	(0)
1999–2001	Berwick Rangers	10	(0)
2000–2001	Hamilton Academical	5	(0)
2001–2002	East Fife	15	(1)
- Linlithgow Rose
Total		323	(4)

Managerial career
- 2009–2013: Duns
- 2014: Coldstream
- * Club domestic league appearances and goals

Neil Oliver (born 11 April 1967) is an English former footballer who played for Berwick Rangers, Blackburn Rovers, Falkirk, Hamilton Academical, Clydebank and East Fife.

Following a spell as a coach of the Berwick Rangers reserve team, Oliver became manager of Duns in 2009, taking them from the Border Amateur League into the East of Scotland League in 2011–12. He parted company with Duns in August 2013, and was appointed manager of East of Scotland League Premier Division side Coldstream on 21 January 2014. On 15 October 2014, Neil resigned as manager of Coldstream.

== Honours ==
Falkirk

- Scottish Challenge Cup: 1993–94
