= 1993 Scottish Challenge Cup final =

- Event: 1993–94 Scottish Challenge Cup
Falkirk	St Mirren
3	0
- Date: 12 December 1993
- Venue: Fir Park, Motherwell
- Referee: Douglas Hope (Erskine)
- Attendance: 13,763

The 1993 Scottish Challenge Cup final, also known as the B&Q Cup final for sponsorship reasons, was an association football match between Falkirk and St Mirren on 12 December 1993 at Fir Park in Motherwell. It was the fourth final of the Scottish Challenge Cup since it was first organised in 1990 to celebrate the centenary of the Scottish Football League.

The match was Falkirk's first national cup final in 36 years since winning the Scottish Cup in 1957; whilst it was St Mirren's first in only six years since lifting the Scottish Cup in 1987. The tournament was contested by clubs below the Scottish Premier Division, with both finalists from the First Division.

The match was goalless after 45 minutes, but Falkirk took the lead two minutes into the second half with a goal from Neil Duffy and only one minute later were 2–0 up with a goal from Richard Cadette. The final goal of the game came from John Hughes, which was enough for Falkirk to win the match 3–0 and the tournament for the first time.

== Route to the final ==
=== Falkirk ===
Round	Opposition	Score
First round	Alloa Athletic (h)	2–1
Second round	Cowdenbeath (h)	3–0
Quarter-final	Dunfermline Athletic (h)	4–1
Semi-final	Livingston (h)	3–2

Falkirk faced neighbours Alloa Athletic at home in the first round with the home team producing a 2–1 victory. The second round draw saw Cowdenbeath travel to Brockville Park, in another home game for Falkirk with the team winning 3–0 to progress to the quarter-final. The reward for reaching the quarter-final was a third home game of the tournament against rivals Dunfermline Athletic with The Bairns emerging 4–1 winners. The semi-final opposition was Livingston, and a fourth consecutive home game at Brockville with Falkirk winning 3–2 to book a place in the Scottish Challenge Cup final for the first time.

=== St Mirren ===
Round	Opposition	Score
First round	Clyde (a)	1–0
Second round	Morton (a)	4–2
Quarter-final	Airdrieonians (a)	1–0
Semi-final	Ayr United (a)	2–1

St Mirren faced a trip to Clyde in the first round which saw the team emerge 1–0 winners. The second round was another game on the road against Renfrewshire rivals Morton with The Saints producing a 4–2 victory to progress to the quarter-finals. A third away game of the tournament saw St Mirren travel to Airdrieonians, winning 1–0. The reward for reaching the semi-final was another away game with the opponents in the form of Ayr United at Somerset Park. St Mirren won 2–1 to book a place in the final. St Mirren reached the Scottish Challenge Cup final for the first time.

== Pre-match ==
=== Analysis ===
Falkirk played all of their games preceding the final at their home of Brockville Park, in the process scoring twelve goals and conceding four. On the other hand, St Mirren played all four of their games on the road with no matches played at their home of Love Street. Despite playing all of their games away from home, St Mirren scored eight goals and conceded only three, whilst keeping two clean sheets compared with Falkirk's one. This was the first appearance for both Falkirk and St Mirren in the Scottish Challenge Cup final since its inauguration in 1990.

== Match ==
12 December 1993
14:30 GMT

Falkirk	3–0	St Mirren
Duffy 47'; Cadette 48'; Hughes 65'	Report

Fir Park, Motherwell
Attendance: 13,763
Referee: Douglas Hope (Erskine)

=== Teams ===
Falkirk:
GK	(England) Tony Parks
DF	(Scotland) Joe McLaughlin
DF	(Scotland) John Hughes
DF	(Scotland) David Weir
DF	(Scotland) Tommy McQueen
MF	(Scotland) Eddie May
MF	(Scotland) Ian McCall	(substituted off) 78'
MF	(Scotland) Brian Rice
MF	(Scotland) Neil Duffy
FW	(England) Kevin Drinkell	(substituted off) 78'
FW	(England) Richard Cadette
Substitutes:
GK	(England) Ian Westwater
DF	(England) Neil Oliver	(substituted on) 78'
FW	(Scotland) Greg Shaw	(substituted on) 78'
Manager:
(Scotland) Jim Jefferies

St Mirren:
GK	(Scotland) Campbell Money
DF	(Scotland) Robert Dawson
DF	(Scotland) Martin Baker
DF	(Scotland) Norrie McWhirter
DF	(Scotland) Barry McLaughlin
MF	(Scotland) Neil Orr
MF	(Scotland) Alex Bone	(substituted off) 55'
MF	(Scotland) Jim Dick
MF	(Scotland) Barry Lavety
FW	(Scotland) David Elliot
FW	(Scotland) John Hewitt	(substituted off) 87'
Substitutes:
GK	(Scotland) Alan Combe
DF	(Scotland) Paul McIntyre	(substituted on) 87'
FW	(Scotland) Ricky Gillies	(substituted on) 55'
Manager:
(Scotland) Jimmy Bone

Match rules

- 90 minutes.
- 30 minutes of extra-time if necessary.
- Penalty shoot-out if scores still level.
