= Peter Hetherston =

Scottish footballer and manager

Personal information
- Date of birth: 6 November 1964 (age 61)
- Place of birth: Bellshill, Scotland
- Position: Midfielder

Senior career*
Years	Team	Apps	(Gls)
1986–1987	Falkirk	70	(7)
1987–1988	Watford	5	(1)
1988	Sheffield United	11	(0)
1988–1991	Falkirk	79	(9)
1991–1994	Raith Rovers	108	(10)
1994–1996	Aberdeen	33	(0)
1996–1997	Airdrieonians	8	(4)
1997–1999	Partick Thistle	5	(1)
1999–2001	Raith Rovers	32	(2)
2003	Queen of the South	1	(0)
Total		352	(33)

Managerial career
- 1999–2001: Raith Rovers
- 2002–2003: Albion Rovers
- * Club domestic league appearances and goals

Peter Hetherston (born 6 November 1964) is a Scottish former professional footballer who played as a midfielder.

== Career ==
Hetherston played over 350 league matches during his seventeen-year playing career, appearing for eight different clubs. Hetherston was appointed as manager of Raith Rovers in 1999, spending two years with Rovers before resigning in December 2001. In May 2002, Hetherston was appointed manager of Albion Rovers, releasing fifteen players just a week later. Hetherston faced a charge in November 2003 for making sexist remarks about women in football and promptly resigned after another charge three weeks later.

Hetherston – who is now a publican – was one of a number of players who featured in the 2001 film A Shot at Glory, starring Robert Duvall and Michael Keaton.

== Family ==
Peter's younger brother, Brian, was also a talented midfielder. During his career he played for St Mirren and Raith Rovers as well as representing Scotland at Under-21 level. In 1997, he was diagnosed with epilepsy but managed to continue with his career. He died at his home in Coatbridge, Scotland on 4 March 2006 from a suspected epileptic seizure. He was 29 years old.

== Personal life ==
In July 2024, Hetherston appeared in court accused of attempted murder following an altercation in a bar in Bellshill in 2022.

== Honours ==
=== Player ===
Falkirk

- Scottish First Division: 1

1990–91

Raith Rovers

- Scottish First Division: 1

1992–93

Aberdeen

- Scottish League Cup: 1

1995–96

=== Manager ===
Raith Rovers

- Fife Cup 1999-2000
