= Alex Low =

Scottish footballer

Personal information
- Full name: Alexander Low
- Date of birth: 1908
- Place of birth: Bonnybridge, Scotland
- Position: Centre half

Senior career*
Years	Team	Apps	(Gls)
- Banknock
- Bonnybridge Juniors
1929–1938	Falkirk	130	(6)
1935–1936	→ Workington (loan)		
1936–1937	→ Tunbridge Wells Rangers (loan)		
1938–1946	Raith Rovers	24	(0)

International career
1933	Scotland	1	(0)
- * Club domestic league appearances and goals

Alexander Low (born 1908; date of death unknown) was a Scottish footballer who played as a centre half.

== Career ==
Raised in Greenhill, Low played club football for Falkirk, Workington (loan), Tunbridge Wells Rangers (loan) and Raith Rovers, with the later part of his career interrupted by World War II.

Low made one appearance for Scotland in 1933, a defeat to Ireland in Glasgow – he was one of five in the home team who were not selected for international duty again.
