= Stephen Raynes =

Scottish footballer (born 1979)

Personal information
- Full name: Stephen Raynes
- Date of birth: 4 September 1971 (age 55)
- Place of birth: Edinburgh, Scotland
- Position: Midfielder

Senior career*
Years	Team	Apps	(Gls)
1991-1993	Hibernian	3	(0)
- Hong Kong Rangers
1996–1997	Dundalk	14	(0)
1997-1998	Livingston	32	(2)
1998-1999	Forfar	32	(0)
1999-2001	Brechin	51	(1)
2001-2002	Cowdenbeath	15	(0)
- * Club domestic league appearances and goals

Stephen Raynes (born 4 September 1971) is a Scottish former footballer who played as a midfielder for Forfar and Livingston.

== Career ==
=== Playing career ===
Raynes started his career at Hibernian and left Easter Road in 1993 having made 3 first team appearances.

After leaving Hibernian, Raynes ventured abroad and played in Hong Kong with Hong Kong Rangers.

In the 1996–97 season he played in Ireland for Dundalk. He returned to Scotland in 1997 to sign for Livingston, making his debut in a 2–0 defeat to Hearts in the Scottish League Cup on 9 August 1997. He went on to make 32 league appearances for Livingston and scored twice.

Raynes was on the move again in 1998, and signed for Forfar. He made 32 league appearances for Forfar before leaving in 1999.

After a successful trial period, Raynes signed for Brechin in 1999. He remained at Glebe Park for 2 years and appeared in 51 games.

Now approaching the end of his career, he spent the 2001–2002 season at Cowdenbeath. He appeared 15 times for the team before retiring from professional football.
