= Thomas Ferguson (goalkeeper) =

Scottish footballer

Thomas Thomson Ferguson
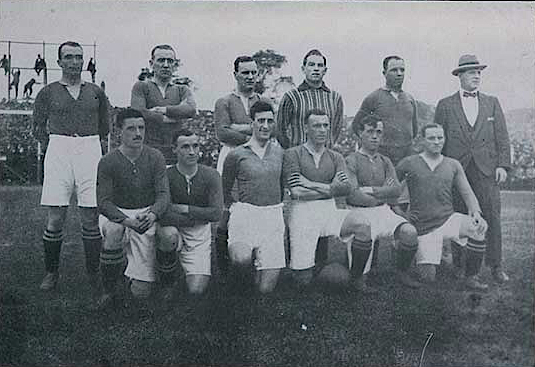
- Third Lanark team during 1923 tour – Ferguson standing, third from right (striped jersey)

Personal information
- Full name: Thomas Thomson Ferguson
- Date of birth: 30 January 1898
- Place of birth: Longriggend, Scotland
- Date of death: 13 June 1955 (aged 57)
- Place of death: South Africa
- Height: 5 ft 10 in (1.78 m)
- Position: Goalkeeper

Senior career*
| Years | Team | Apps | (Gls) |
| – | Bedlay Juniors | | |
| 1919–1932 | Falkirk | 451 | (0) |

International career
| 1921–1927 | Scottish League XI | 3 | (0) |
- * Club domestic league appearances and goals

Thomas Ferguson (30 January 1898 – 13 June 1955) was a Scottish footballer who played as a goalkeeper. He spent his entire senior career, spanning 13 years, with Falkirk, and holds the club record for appearances (almost 500 in the Scottish Football League and Scottish Cup). He was selected for the Scottish Football League XI three times and in 1923 he was a member of a squad organised by Third Lanark that toured South America.
