= David Hagen =

Scottish footballer (1973–2020)

Personal information
- Full name: David James Hagen
- Date of birth: 5 May 1973
- Place of birth: Edinburgh, Scotland
- Date of death: 24 July 2020 (aged 47)
- Position: Midfielder

Youth career
- 1988–1989: Grahamston BC
- 1989–1992: Rangers

Senior career*
Years	Team	Apps	(Gls)
1992–1994	Rangers	16	(3)
1994–1995	Heart of Midlothian	27	(4)
1995–2000	Falkirk	139	(11)
2000–2001	Livingston	20	(1)
2001–2004	Clyde	90	(7)
2004–2006	Peterhead	41	(3)
2006–2007	Bo'ness United		

International career
1992–1993	Scotland U21	7	(0)
- * Club domestic league appearances and goals

David James Hagen (5 May 1973 – 24 July 2020) was a Scottish professional footballer.

== Playing career ==
Hagen began his career with Rangers, where he played 20 competitive games, before moving to Hearts.

He then moved to hometown team Falkirk. He stayed for five years, making over 100 appearances for the Bairns including the 1997 Scottish Cup final. He scored the only goal in the 1997 Scottish Challenge Cup Final win versus Queen of the South.

He then joined Livingston, where he won the Scottish First Division title. He joined Clyde in 2001, and scored the fastest goal of the 2001-02 season, scoring after only 16 seconds against Raith Rovers.

Hagen joined Peterhead in 2004. This was to be his last senior club, before he joined junior side Bo'ness United in 2006, where he played for a year before retiring.

== Death ==
In July 2018, it was reported that Hagen was suffering from motor neuron disease. He died of the illness on 24 July 2020, aged 47.
