= Hans Leitert =

Austrian footballer (born 1973)

Personal information
- Date of birth: 15 January 1973 (age 53)
- Place of birth: Vienna, Austria
- Height: 1.84 m (6 ft 0 in)
- Position: Goalkeeper

Senior career*
Years	Team	Apps	(Gls)
1992–1993	ÖMV Stadlau		
1994	SV Schwechat		
1994–1997	VfB Mödling		
1997–1998	Wiener Sport-Club		
- * Club domestic league appearances and goals

Hans Leitert (born 15 January 1973) is an Austrian former goalkeeping coach and current consultant within the football industry. As of June 2024 he is the FSG Fenway Sports Group Global Head of Goalkeeping.

== Managerial career ==
He has coached at VfB Mödling, SK Rapid Vienna, FK Austria Vienna, before coaching the goalkeepers of the Austria national under-21 team, followed by coaching the first team keepers at international clubs Panathinaikos, Real Club Recreativo de Huelva and Tottenham Hotspur.

After having coached the Austrian Under 21 national team for 6 years, Hans went to Panathinaikos as goalkeeping coach where he worked alongside Italian Alberto Malesani, then Swedish Head Coach Hans Backe and afterwards Spaniard Víctor Muñoz. In 2007 he left Athens and in 2008 helped Spanish side Real Club Recreativo de Huelva to stay in the Primera Division. He joined Tottenham Hotspur in May 2008 with Juande Ramos as manager. He left Spurs in the same year after the sacking of Ramos.

From July 2010 until December 2015 Hans Leitert was Head of Goalkeeping at Red Bull's football project where he was responsible for all goalkeeping related topics for all Red Bull's football clubs FC Red Bull Salzburg, RB Leipzig, New York Red Bulls and Red Bull Brasil (until 2013 also Red Bull Ghana).

In February 2018 Leitert was appointed as a goalkeeping consultant for Premier League team Liverpool. In June 2024 he took on the role as FSG Fenway Sports Group Global Head of Goalkeeping.

== Additional ==
Leitert was born in Vienna. He was formerly a goalkeeper for the Austrian under-21 and under-18 teams, before having to retire early due to a broken scaphoid bone (wrist). He holds a Master's degree in Sports Science and previously spoke at goalkeeping lectures on behalf of FIFA as well as the Spanish Football Association. He is part of the UEFA Goalkeeper Advisory Group which runs the European Goalkeeper Coach Education Programme.

In January 2016 he founded his own Sports Consulting limited, based in London, UK, where he works as a consultant within the football industry, linked and contracted to mainly high elite organisations such as top flight clubs or federations.

== Publications ==
In 2008, he published his book "The Art Of Goalkeeping Or The Seven Principles Of The Masters" in English.

== Personal life ==
Hans Leitert is married to Karin and has one daughter.
