= Scott MacKenzie (footballer) =

Scottish footballer and coach

Personal information
- Date of birth: 7 July 1970 (age 56)
- Place of birth: Glasgow, Scotland
- Positions: Defender; midfielder

Senior career*
Years	Team	Apps	(Gls)
1991–2000	Falkirk	216	(8)
2000–2003	St Mirren	58	(1)
2003–2005	Falkirk	93	(1)
2005–2006	Hamilton Academical	20	(1)
2006–2007	Queen of the South	16	(0)

Managerial career
- 2007: Dumbarton (U17 manager)
- 2008–2012: Ayr United (assistant)
- 2013–2018: Partick Thistle (reserves manager)
- 2020–2023: Albion Rovers (assistant)
- * Club domestic league appearances and goals

Scott MacKenzie (born 7 September 1970) is a Scottish professional football player and coach. During his career he played for Falkirk (twice), St Mirren, Hamilton Academical and Queen of the South. MacKenzie then stepped into football coaching, coaching at Ayr United F.C., Partick Thistle F.C. and Albion Rovers F.C.

== Coaching career ==
After retiring, MacKenzie was hired as U-17 coach at Dumbarton. In December 2007, it was revealed that MacKenzie had agreed to become assistant coach to his former teammate, Brian Reid, at Ayr United. Together the duo helped Ayr United get promoted to the First Division for the 2010-11 season. In his time at Ayr United, the club had cup success with some memorable wins over Scottish Premiership sides Hibernian F.C., Saint Mirren F.C, Inverness Caledonian Thistle F.C and Heart of Midlothian F.C. Cup wins would guide Ayr to a League Cup semi-final against Kilmarnock at Hampden Park in 2012. Kilmarnock won the tie 1-0 following extra time who would go on and win the League cup that year with a win over Celtic in the Final. Brian Reid and Mackenzie would leave Ayr United shortly after when the club announced their contracts wouldn’t be renewed.

In January 2013 MacKenzie joined Partick Thistle as U-20/reserve team manager. He left this position in October 2018. Ahead of the 2020-21 season, MacKenzie was reunited with Brian Reid as the duo took over at Albion Rovers. In March 2023, they were sacked after almost three years at the club, following a defeat to Bonnyrigg Rose, which dropped Albion to last place in the table.
