= Jamie McAllister =

Scottish footballer

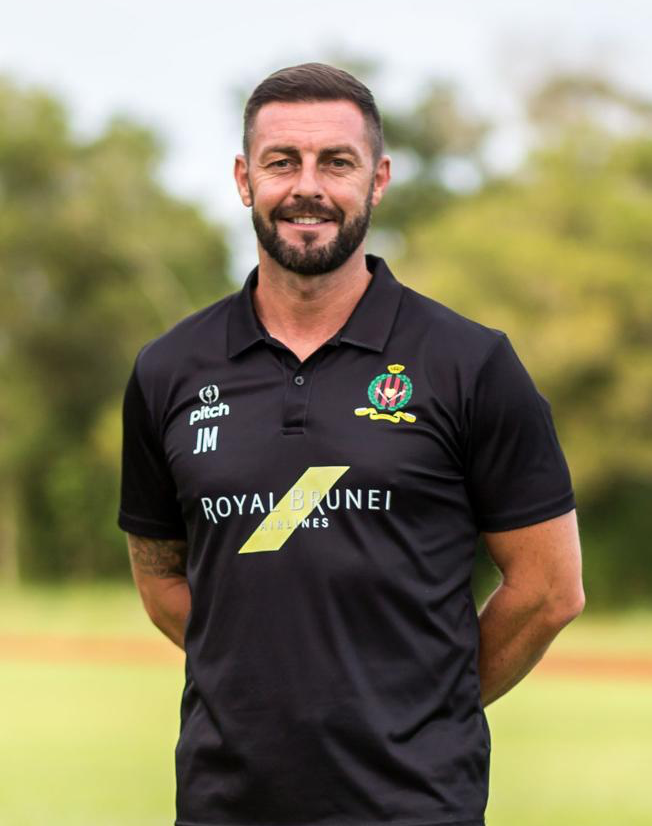
- McAllister in 2024

Personal information
- Full name: James Reynolds McAllister
- Date of birth: 26 April 1978 (age 48)
- Place of birth: Glasgow, Scotland
- Position: Defender

Team information
- Current team: DPMM (head coach)

Youth career
- Bellshill B.C.

Senior career*
Years	Team	Apps	(Gls)
1996–1999	Queen of the South	42	(0)
1999–2003	Aberdeen	117	(1)
2003–2004	Livingston	34	(1)
2004–2006	Heart of Midlothian	47	(0)
2006–2012	Bristol City	186	(3)
2012	→ Preston North End (loan)	4	(0)
2012–2014	Yeovil Town	72	(0)
2014	Kerala Blasters	6	(0)
2015–2016	Exeter City	42	(0)
Total		550	(4)

International career
2004	Scotland	1	(0)

Managerial career
- 2024–: DPMM
- 2024: Brunei (interim)
- * Club domestic league appearances and goals

James Reynolds McAllister (born 26 April 1978 in Glasgow) is a Scottish professional football coach and former player who played as a defender. He is currently the head coach of the Malaysia Super League club, DPMM.

McAllister played for Queen of the South, Aberdeen, Livingston, Heart of Midlothian, Bristol City, Preston North End, Yeovil Town, Kerala Blasters and Exeter City. He made one full international appearance for Scotland, in 2004. Since retiring as a player he has been an assistant coach at Bristol City, Sunderland and Hibernian.

== Club career ==
=== Early career ===
McAllister signed an "S" form with Motherwell Boys Club, before being released from his contract by then Motherwell manager Alex McLeish. McAllister then joined Bellshill Boys Club where he played alongside David Lilley.

=== Queen of the South ===
McAllister began his senior career in 1996 by signing for Dumfries club Queen of the South with new chairman Norman Blount getting the wheels moving on the club's revival. At Palmerston Park McAllister and Lilley became teammates again.

In 1997 the club reached the Scottish Challenge Cup final for the first time. Second division Queen of the South lost 1–0 to First division Falkirk despite a rousing Queens display at Motherwell's Fir Park Stadium; a performance that included the man of the match award going to Queens veteran central midfield playmaker Tommy Bryce and an early career appearance for McAllister as substitute. A late chance for a Derek Townsley equaliser went agonisingly over for Queens.

McAllister became one of the most sought after players in the lower leagues and was courted by several Scottish Premier League clubs before leaving at the end of the season in 1999.

=== Aberdeen ===
Ebbe Skovdahl signed him for Aberdeen for a fee of £85,000 with further add ons as he made more appearances, resulting in a final fee of over £100,000. Lilley became his teammate at the third successive club. He scored once during his spell in Aberdeen, his strike coming in a 2–0 Scottish Cup win over his future club Livingston on 26 January 2002.

=== Livingston ===
In June 2003 Livingston signed McAllister on a free transfer after competition from English clubs. It was in this spell at the West Lothian club that he regained his form and won a deserved call up from Berti Vogts for the International friendly match against Trinidad and Tobago. It was also during his spell at Livingston that he won the Scottish League Cup after a 2–0 victory over Hibernian in which he scored the second goal in the final. His only other goal for Livingston came in a 3–1 league win against Motherwell on 14 February 2004.

=== Heart of Midlothian ===
At the end of the 2003–04 season McAllister's contract expired and he agreed a two-year deal to sign for Heart of Midlothian. During his spell at Tynecastle he was mainly used as a squad player, due to the outstanding form of Takis Fyssas and the signing of Jose Goncalves.

In January 2006, McAllister agreed a two-year contract extension; however he was soon dissatisfied with his peripheral status at the club, particularly after the appointment of Valdas Ivanauskas as Hearts manager in April. McAllister scored twice during his spell at Hearts with both goals coming in the Scottish Cup. His first came in the 2004–05 season against former club Livingston, and his second came the following season against Kilmarnock.

=== Bristol City ===
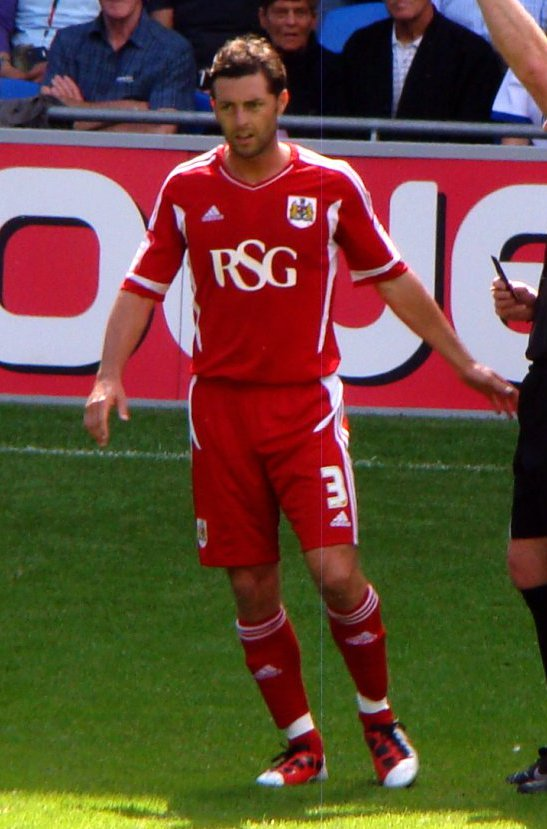
McAllister playing for Bristol City in 2011

On 2 August 2006 McAllister signed for Bristol City on a two-year contract. In his first season at the Ashton Gate stadium he helped the club gain promotion to the Championship.

In his second season McAllister was a mainstay of the team that made it to the final of the Championship play-offs. On 24 May 2008 Hull City defeated Bristol City 1–0 to reach the English Premier League with a goal from Dean Windass after 38 minutes.

On 10 March 2009 he scored his first goal in over a year with a curling effort from the edge of the box against Coventry City.

On 21 January 2012, he joined Preston North End on a one-month loan deal.

=== Yeovil Town ===
Having been released by Bristol City at the end of the 2011–12 season, McAllister signed for Football League One side Yeovil Town on a two-year contract linking up with former manager Gary Johnson. McAllister captained his Yeovil side to victory in the 2013 League One play-off final and promotion to the Football League Championship for the first time in the club's history.

McAllister made a further 40 appearances in the 2013–14 season for Yeovil but could not prevent them from suffering relegation from the Championship, and was released at the end of the campaign.

=== Kerala Blasters ===
Following his release by Yeovil, McAllister joined Indian Super League side Kerala Blasters as a player/coach on 21 July 2014.

=== Exeter City ===
On 16 January 2015, McAllister returned to English football signing for League Two side Exeter City.

== International career ==
McAllister made his Scotland debut, on 30 May 2004, in a 4–1 friendly victory against Trinidad and Tobago at Easter Road.

On 2 October 2008, McAllister was recalled to the Scotland squad by manager George Burley for the FIFA World Cup qualifier against Norway. On 17 March 2009, McAllister was called up to the Scotland squad for their 2010 FIFA World Cup qualifying double-header against the Netherlands and Iceland.

== Managerial career ==
=== Kerala Blasters ===
On 21 August 2014, while still an active professional footballer, McAllister joined Indian Super League club Kerala Blasters as a player/coach role where he would be the assistant manager under David James.

=== Bristol City ===
On 1 July 2016, McAllister announced his retirement from playing professional football to take up the role of under-21 manager at Bristol City. He then became assistant manager to Lee Johnson at Bristol City.

=== Sunderland ===
On 30 December 2020, McAllister was appointed assistant head coach at Sunderland, again working with Johnson. With the sacking of Johnson on 30 January 2022, McAllister also left his role at Sunderland.

=== Hibernian ===
McAllister again teamed up with Johnson at Hibernian, becoming their assistant manager on 5 June 2022. McAllister left the club on 27 August 2023, following the club decision to sack Johnson.

=== Bristol Rovers ===
In December 2023, McAllister joined Bristol Rovers, supporting Matt Taylor following his appointment as first-team manager. On 3 February 2024, he was confirmed to have joined the club in the role of assistant manager. He departed the club at the end of the 2023–24 season.

=== DPMM ===
On 9 July 2024, McAllister was unveiled as the new head coach of Brunei club DPMM FC which competed in the Singapore Premier League. He replaced Rui Capela just six games into the season. The following September, he was appointed interim head coach of the Brunei national team, taking charge of the Wasps for the play-offs for the third qualifying round of the 2027 AFC Asian Cup against Macau over two legs. He led them to victories in both games, advancing Brunei to the next stage.

When DPMM moved to the Malaysia Super League starting from the 2025–26 season, McAllister remained as the guest team's head coach. He extended his contract for another year on 30 June 2026.

== Career statistics ==
=== Club ===
As of match played 7 May 2016

Appearances and goals by club, season and competition
Club	Season	League			National Cup		League Cup		UEFA Cup		Other (Note: Includes Scottish Challenge Cup, Football League Trophy & Football League play-off matches.)		Total	
Club	Season	Division	Apps	Goals	Apps	Goals	Apps	Goals	Apps	Goals	Apps	Goals	Apps	Goals
Queen of the South	1997–98	Scottish Second Division	15	0	2	1	1	0	–		1	0	19	1
Queen of the South	1998–99	Scottish Second Division	27	0	0	0	0	0	–		0	0	27	0
Queen of the South	Total		42	0	2	1	1	0	0	0	1	0	46	1
Aberdeen	1999–00	Scottish Premier League	34	0	7	0	4	0	–		–		45	0
Aberdeen	2000–01	Scottish Premier League	25	0	2	0	1	0	–		–		28	0
Aberdeen	2001–02	Scottish Premier League	29	0	3	1	1	0	–		–		33	1
Aberdeen	2002–03	Scottish Premier League	29	0	3	0	2	0	4	0	–		38	0
Aberdeen	Total		117	0	15	0	8	0	4	0	0	0	144	1
Livingston	2003–04	Scottish Premier League	34	1	4	0	5	1	–		–		43	2
Livingston	Total		34	1	4	0	5	1	0	0	0	0	43	2
Heart of Midlothian	2004–05	Scottish Premier League	30	0	5	1	3	0	6	0	–		44	1
Heart of Midlothian	2005–06	Scottish Premier League	17	0	2	1	2	0	–		–		21	1
Heart of Midlothian	Total		47	0	7	2	5	0	6	0	0	0	65	2
Bristol City	2006–07	League One	31	1	6	0	1	0	–		3	0	41	1
Bristol City	2007–08	Championship	41	0	1	0	2	0	–		3 (Note: 3 appearances in the Championship play-offs.)	0	47	0
Bristol City	2008–09	Championship	35	1	1	0	2	0	–		–		38	1
Bristol City	2009–10	Championship	33	0	2	0	1	0	–		–		36	0
Bristol City	2010–11	Championship	34	1	0	0	1	1	–		–		35	2
Bristol City	2011–12	Championship	12	0	0	0	1	0	–		–		13	0
Bristol City	Total		186	3	10	0	8	1	0	0	6	0	210	4
Preston North End (loan)	2011–12	League One	4	0	0	0	–		–		0	0	4	0
Yeovil Town	2012–13	League One	34	0	1	0	2	0	–		7 (Note: Includes 3 appearances in the League One play-offs.)	0	44	0
Yeovil Town	2013–14	Championship	38	0	1	0	1	0	–		–		40	0
Yeovil Town	Total		72	0	2	0	3	0	0	0	7	0	84	0
Kerala Blasters	2014	Indian Super League	6	0	0	0	0	0	–		–		6	0
Kerala Blasters	Total		6	0	0	0	0	0	0	0	0	0	6	0
Exeter City	2014–15	League Two	14	0	0	0	0	0	–		0	0	14	0
Exeter City	2015–16	League Two	28	0	1	0	2	0	–		0	0	31	0
Exeter City	Total		42	0	1	0	2	0	0	0	0	0	45	0
Career total			550	4	41	3	32	2	10	0	14	0	647	9

=== International ===
As of match played 30 May 2004

Team	Year	Apps	Goals
Scotland	2004	1	0
Total		1	0

== Managerial statistics ==
As of match played 20 November 2026

Managerial record by team and tenure
Team	Nat.	From	To	Record					Ref.
Team	Nat.	From	To	G	W	D	L	Win %	Ref.
Brunei (interim)	(Brunei)	15 July 2024	19 October 2024	4	2	1	1	50.00	
DPMM	(Brunei)	15 July 2024	Present	74	27	15	32	36.49	
Career Total				78	29	16	33	37.18	

== Honours ==
Yeovil Town

- Football League One play-offs: 2013
