= Derek Townsley =

English footballer (born 1973)

Personal information
- Full name: Derek Johnstone Townsley
- Date of birth: 21 January 1973 (age 53)
- Place of birth: Carlisle, England
- Position: Midfielder

Youth career
- Carlisle United

Senior career*
Years	Team	Apps	(Gls)
–1996	Gretna		
1996–1999	Queen of the South	59	(18)
1999–2001	Motherwell	54	(6)
2001–2003	Hibernian	43	(9)
2003–2004	Oxford United	11	(0)
2004–2007	Gretna	84	(23)
2007	Workington		
2007	Newcastle Blue Star		
2007–2008	Penrith Town		
2008–2010	Annan Athletic	36	(1)

Managerial career
- 2015–2016: Workington
- * Club domestic league appearances and goals as of 2 June 2010

Derek Johnstone Townsley (born 21 January 1973, in Carlisle) is an English former professional footballer. His clubs included Gretna, Queen of the South, Motherwell, Hibernian and Oxford United. Townsley was normally a midfielder, although he was a versatile player and also played in attack and defence.

== Career ==
=== Gretna (first spell) and Queen of the South ===
Prior to being a fully professional footballer, Townsley worked as a postman. While in his first spell with Gretna, who were a Northern Premier League club in the English football league system at the time, he played in the FA Cup first round match against the First Division side Bolton. Townsley scored in the match but Gretna lost 3–2.

He began his senior career in 1996 when he joined Dumfries side Queen of the South, with chairman Norman Blount getting the wheels moving on the club's revival. Townsley's creative talents made him a mainstay of the team as the club were rebuilding in the late 1990s. The club reached the Scottish Challenge Cup final for the first time in 1997. Second Division Queens lost 1–0 to First Division side Falkirk at Fir Park. Townsley had a late chance to score an equaliser teed up by man of the match Tommy Bryce, but his shot went over the bar.

=== Motherwell and Hibernian ===
Townsley moved into full-time football for the first time at the age of 26 when he joined Motherwell on 31 May 1999.

He was then signed by Hibernian manager Alex McLeish in July 2001 after his contract with Motherwell expired. Townsley struggled to hold down a place under the management of McLeish, but he got into the team more regularly after Bobby Williamson was appointed manager in February 2002. Townsley also popped up with a few goals, including one in a remarkable Edinburgh derby that finished 4–4. Townsley left Hibs at the end of his contract to sign for Oxford United.

=== Oxford United, Gretna (second spell) and later career ===
Townsley only stayed with Oxford for six months before returning to Gretna. Now bankrolled by Brooks Mileson and in the Scottish football league system, Townsley re-joined a vastly different club to the non-league outfit that he left early in his career. He played an important part in Gretna's successive promotions and played in the 2006 Scottish Cup Final. The team was then largely 'ripped apart' by Director of Football, Mick Wadsworth, in preparation for their only season in the Scottish Premier League.

He moved to Workington in February 2007, before moving onto Newcastle Blue Star and Penrith Town. In July 2008, Townsley signed for Scottish Football League newcomers Annan Athletic as a player and assistant manager. He announced his retirement from playing at the end of the 2009–10 season, also choosing to step down from his assistant position at the same time.
