= 2005–06 Clyde F.C. season =

Clyde Football Club
2005-2006 season
- Chairman: Len McGuire
- Manager: Graham Roberts
- First Division: 5th
- Scottish Cup: Fourth round (replay)
- League Cup: Third round
- Challenge Cup: First round
- Top goalscorer: League: Alex Williams (12); All: Alex Williams (13)
- Highest home attendance: 8,000 (vs Celtic, 8 January 2006)
- Lowest home attendance: 813 (vs Ross County, 1 April 2006)
Home colours	Away colours	Third colours

In season 2005–06, Clyde competed in their sixth consecutive season in the Scottish First Division. Graham Roberts was appointed as new manager, after Billy Reid left to join Hamilton Academical. Roberts appointed ex-Celtic player Joe Miller as his assistant.

Clyde finished fifth in the Scottish First Division. They went out of the Scottish League Cup in the third round the Scottish Cup in the fourth round and the Scottish Challenge Cup in the first round.

It was a season to enjoy for the fans, as they watched their team take the lead against Rangers at Ibrox in the Scottish League Cup, though they were eventually defeated after extra-time. They beat Celtic 2–1 in the Scottish Cup, which was the club's biggest victory for years.

== Transfers ==
=== May to December ===
In:

Player	From	Fee
(Scotland) Chris Higgins	Motherwell	Free
(Scotland) Stephen O'Donnell	Boston United	Free
(Scotland) Billy Brawley	Selkirk	Free
(Scotland) Craig McKeown	Dunfermline Athletic	Free
(Northern Ireland) Michael McGowan	Dundee	Free
(Scotland) Roddy Hunter	Unattached	Free
(Scotland) Paul McHale	Cowdenbeath	Undisclosed
(Scotland) Peter Cherrie	Ayr United	Free
(France) Romauld Bouadji	Carshalton Athletic	Free
(Scotland) Andrew Dick	Falkirk	Free
(Scotland) Steven Masterton	Kilmarnock	Free
(Scotland) Alex Williams	Greenock Morton	Free
(Scotland) Paul Jarvie	Dundee United	Free
(Scotland) Neil McGregor	Kilmarnock	Free
(Scotland) Joe Miller	Unattached	Free
(Scotland) Sean McKenna	Queens Park Youth	Free
(Scotland) Raymond Inglis	Hamilton Academical Youth	Free
(Scotland) Santino Marini	St Mirren Youth	Free
(Scotland) David Scott	Albion Rovers Youth	Free
(Scotland) Gordon Parks	East Stirlingshire	Free
(Scotland) Paul Hilland	Queen of the South	Free
(Scotland) Tom Brighton	Rangers	Free

Out:

Player	From	Fee
(England) Bryn Halliwell	St Johnstone	Free
(Scotland) Allan Morrison	Stranraer	Free
(England) Simon Mensing	St Johnstone	Free
(Scotland) Gary Bollan	Brechin City	Free
(Scotland) John Potter	St Mirren	Free
(Scotland) Stuart Balmer	Hamilton Academical	Free
(Scotland) Scott Wilson	Raith Rovers	Free
(Scotland) Paul Doyle	Montrose	Free
(Scotland) Jimmy Gibson	Partick Thistle	Free
(England) Darren Sheridan	St Johnstone	Free
(Scotland) Ian Harty	Hamilton Academical	Free
(England) Graeme Jones	Hamilton Academical	Free
(Scotland) Mark Gilhaney	Hamilton Academical	Free
(Scotland) David Greenhill	Alloa Athletic	Free
(Scotland) Graeme McCracken	Cumbernauld United	Free
(Spain) Miguel Angel Espinola	Granada CF	Free
(Scotland) Alex Burns	Motherwell	Loan Return
(Scotland) Chris Gardiner	Heart of Midlothian	Loan Return
(Scotland) Paul Hilland	Raith Rovers	Loan

=== January to April ===
In:

Player	From	Fee
(England) Kevin McDonald	Hibernian	Loan
(Scotland) Dougie Imrie	Lanark United	Free

Out:

Player	To	Fee
(Scotland) Billy Brawley	Selkirk	Free
(Scotland) John Paul McKeever	Dumbarton	Free
(Scotland) Paul Flaherty	Unattached	Free
(Scotland) Gordon Parks	Retired	Free

== Squad ==
Note: Flags indicate national team as defined under FIFA eligibility rules; some limited exceptions apply. Players may hold more than one non-FIFA nationality.

No.	Pos.	Nation	Player
—	GK	SCO	Peter Cherrie
—	GK	SCO	Paul Jarvie
—	GK	SCO	David Scott
—	DF	FRA	Romauld Bouadji
—	DF	SCO	Robert Harris
—	DF	SCO	Chris Higgins
—	DF	SCO	Paul Hilland
—	DF	SCO	Raymond Inglis
—	DF	SCO	Neil McGregor
—	DF	NIR	Michael McGowan
—	DF	SCO	Craig McKeown
—	MF	SCO	Kevin Bradley
—	MF	SCO	Billy Brawley
—	MF	SCO	Craig Bryson
—	MF	SCO	Andrew Dick

No.	Pos.	Nation	Player
—	MF	SCO	Eddie Malone
—	MF	SCO	Santino Marini
—	MF	SCO	Steven Masterton
—	MF	ENG	Kevin McDonald
—	MF	SCO	Paul McHale (Captain)
—	MF	SCO	John Paul McKeever
—	MF	SCO	Joe Miller
—	MF	SCO	Stephen O'Donnell
—	FW	SCO	Gary Arbuckle
—	FW	SCO	Tom Brighton
—	FW	SCO	Paul Flaherty
—	FW	SCO	Roddy Hunter
—	FW	SCO	Dougie Imrie
—	FW	SCO	Sean McKenna
—	FW	SCO	Gordon Parks
—	FW	SCO	Alex Williams

== Results ==
Win Draw Loss Upcoming fixture

=== Friendlies ===
Date	Opponents	Stadium	Result F - A	Scorers	Attendance
14 July 2005	Motherwell	Broadwood Stadium	0 - 1
16 July 2005	Manchester United	Broadwood Stadium	1 - 5	McGregor 77'	7,591
25 July 2005	Livingston	Broadwood Stadium	1 - 2	Bryson
27 July 2005	Larkhall Thistle	Gasworks Park	3 - 2	Williams, McGowan, Brawley	150

=== Scottish First Division ===
Date	Opponents	Stadium	Result F - A	Scorers	Attendance	Notes
6 August 2005	Ross County	Victoria Park	1 - 3	Bryson 31'	1,750
13 August 2005	Dundee	Broadwood Stadium	1 - 1	Miller 76'	1,645
20 August 2005	Stranraer	Stair Park	2 - 1	O'Donnell 59' 87'	718
27 August 2005	Queen of the South	Broadwood Stadium	1 - 0	Williams 15'	1,152
10 September 2005	Brechin City	Glebe Park	1 - 1	McHale 46', McGregor (red card) 61'	676
17 September 2005	St Mirren	Love Street	0 - 2		3,068
24 September 2005	St Johnstone	Broadwood Stadium	0 - 1		1,152
1 October 2005	Airdrie United	Excelsior Stadium	3 - 1	Williams 3' 66', Brighton 62'	1,603
15 October 2005	Hamilton Academical	Broadwood Stadium	1 - 1	Williams 24', McGregor (red card) 79'	1,392
22 October 2005	Ross County	Broadwood Stadium	1 - 0	Williams 25'	1,012
26 October 2005	Dundee	Dens Park	3 - 3	Brighton 36', O'Donnell 79' (pen.) 84'	3,360
29 October 2005	Brechin City	Broadwood Stadium	2 - 1	Williams 31', McGowan 51'	984
5 November 2005	Queen of the South	Palmerston Park	2 - 1	McGregor 57', Williams 75'	1,436
12 November 2005	St Mirren	Broadwood Stadium	1 - 2	Williams 61'	2,012
19 November 2005	St Johnstone	McDiarmid Park	0 - 0		2,195
26 November 2005	Airdrie United	Broadwood Stadium	1 - 0	McGowan 23'	1,258
3 December 2005	Hamilton Academical	New Douglas Park	1 - 1	Miller 85'	1,787
10 December 2005	Ross County	Victoria Park	1 - 0	O'Donnell 7'	2,149
17 December 2005	Stranraer	Broadwood Stadium	1 - 0	Masterton 90'	1,012
26 December 2005	Brechin City	Glebe Park	1 - 3	Bryson 90'	711
31 December 2005	Queen of the South	Broadwood Stadium	3 - 0	Williams 7' 62', O'Donnell 40'	1,101
2 January 2006	St Mirren	Love Street	1 - 2	Brighton 47', O'Donnell (red card) 73'	4,338
14 January 2006	St Johnstone	Broadwood Stadium	2 - 3	Masterton 55', Brighton 61'	1,313
21 January 2006	Airdrie United	Excelsior Stadium	1 - 1	Brighton 22', McKeown (red card) 84'	1,623
28 January 2006	Hamilton Academical	Broadwood Stadium	2 - 2	O'Donnell 28' 53'	1,408
11 February 2006	Stranraer	Stair Park	5 - 0	Hunter 3' 5' 32' 83', Bouadji 29'	582
18 February 2006	Dundee	Broadwood Stadium	3 - 3	Brighton 15', MacDonald 23' (own goal), McHale 72'	1,062
4 March 2006	Queen of the South	Palmerston Park	1 - 2	Imrie 78'	1,750
11 March 2006	Brechin City	Broadwood Stadium	5 - 1	Malone 18', Williams 50' 53' 58', O'Donnell 78'	837
18 March 2006	St Mirren	Broadwood Stadium	0 - 1		2,275
25 March 2006	St Johnstone	McDiarmid Park	0 - 1		2,097
1 April 2006	Airdrie United	Broadwood Stadium	3 - 1	McHale 28' (pen.), Bouadji 42', Brighton 79'	1,350
8 April 2006	Hamilton Academical	New Douglas Park	0 - 2		1,360
15 April 2006	Ross County	Broadwood Stadium	2 - 0	O'Donnell 22' 73' (pen.)	813
22 April 2006	Dundee	Dens Park	1 - 0	Imrie 64'	3,199
29 April 2006	Stranraer	Broadwood Stadium	1 - 1	McKeown 90'	1,343

=== Scottish Challenge Cup ===
Date	Round	Opponents	Stadium	Result F - A	Scorers	Attendance	Notes
30 July 2005	Round 1	Brechin City	Glebe Park	2 - 3 AET	Williams 3', McGregor 85'	547

=== Scottish League Cup ===
Date	Round	Opponents	Stadium	Result F - A	Scorers	Attendance	Notes
9 August 2005	Round 1	Montrose	Links Park	1 - 0	Brighton 11'	414
23 August 2005	Round 2	Peterhead	Balmoor	3 - 2	McGregor 3', Higgins (red card) 42', Arbuckle 56', Brighton 73'	584
20 September 2005	Round 3	Rangers	Ibrox Stadium	2 - 5 AET	Bryson 51', O'Donnell 73' (pen.)	30,104

=== Scottish Cup ===
Date	Round	Opponents	Stadium	Result F - A	Scorers	Attendance	Notes
8 January 2006	Round 3	Celtic	Broadwood Stadium	2 - 1	Bryson 32', Malone 36'	8,000
4 February 2006	Round 4	Gretna	Broadwood Stadium	0 - 0	Williams (red card) 28', Higgins (red card) 90'	2,530
14 February 2006	Round 4 replay	Gretna	Raydale Park	0 - 4	McKeown (red card) 71'	2,410

=== Canadian tour ===
Date	Opponents	Stadium	Result F - A	Scorers	Attendance
5 May 2006	Windsor Border Stars	University of Windsor Stadium	1 - 0	Williams 86' (pen.)
7 May 2006	CPSL All Stars	Esther Shiner Stadium	2 - 1	Imrie 18', O'Donnell 55' (pen.)

== Player statistics ==
#	Player	P	Goal	Booked	Sent off (straight red)
GK	(Scotland) Paul Jarvie	21	0	0	0
DF	(Scotland) Neil McGregor	28	3	0	2
MF	(Scotland) Eddie Malone	38	2	0	0
DF	(Scotland) Chris Higgins	39	0	0	2
DF	(Scotland) Craig McKeown	41	1	0	2
MF	(Scotland) Paul McHale	20 (1)	3	0	0
MF	(Scotland) Craig Bryson	37 (3)	4	0	0
MF	(Scotland) Stephen O'Donnell	39 (1)	12	0	1
FW	(Scotland) Alex Williams	36 (2)	13	0	1
FW	(Scotland) Joe Miller	3 (17)	2	0	0
DF	(France) Romauld Bouadji	11 (6)	6	0	0
DF	(Scotland) Robert Harris	16 (6)	0	0	0
FW	(Scotland) Kevin Bradley	1 (8)	0	0	0
MF	(Scotland) Steven Masterton	20 (6)	2	0	0
FW	(Scotland) Tom Brighton	40 (2)	8	0	0
DF	(Northern Ireland) Michael McGowan	40 (1)	2	0	0
FW	(Scotland) Roddy Hunter	3 (13)	4	0	0
MF	(Scotland) Billy Brawley	0 (5)	0	0	0
MF	(Scotland) Andrew Dick	2 (7)	0	0	0
GK	(Scotland) Peter Cherrie	22 (2)	0	0	0
FW	(Scotland) Gary Arbuckle	2 (21)	1	0	0
MF	(Scotland) Kevin McDonald	5 (7)	0	0	0
FW	(Scotland) Dougie Imrie	9 (3)	2	0	0
FW	(Scotland) Sean McKenna	0 (1)	0	0	0
GK	(Scotland) David Scott	0	0	0	0
MF	(Scotland) Santino Marini	0	0	0	0
DF	(Scotland) Raymond Inglis	0	0	0	0

== League table ==
Pos	Team	Pld	W	D	L	GF	GA	GD	Pts
3	Hamilton Academical	36	15	14	7	53	39	+14	59
4	Ross County	36	14	14	8	47	40	+7	56
5	Clyde	36	15	10	11	54	42	+12	55
6	Airdrie United	36	11	12	13	57	43	+14	45
7	Dundee	36	9	16	11	43	50	−7	43

Source: "2005-2006 First Division - SPFL Archive". SPFL.
Rules for classification: 1) points; 2) goal difference; 3) number of goals scored.
