= 2004–05 Airdrie United F.C. season =

Airdrie United
2004–05 season
- Chairman: Jim Ballantyne
- Manager: Sandy Stewart
- Stadium: Excelsior Stadium
- Scottish First Division: Fifth place
- Scottish Cup: Third round
- League Cup: Second round
- Challenge Cup: First round
- Top goalscorer: League: Owen Coyle (14); All: Owen Coyle (15)

Season 2004–05 was Airdrie United's third competitive season. They competed in the First Division, Challenge Cup, League Cup and the Scottish Cup.

== Summary ==
Airdrie United finished fifth in the First Division. They reached the third round of the Scottish Cup, the second round of the League Cup and were eliminated in the first round of the Challenge Cup.

== League table ==
Pos	Team	Pld	W	D	L	GF	GA	GD	Pts
3	Clyde	36	16	12	8	35	29	+6	60
4	Queen of the South	36	14	9	13	36	38	−2	51
5	Airdrie United	36	14	8	14	44	48	−4	50
6	Ross County	36	13	8	15	40	37	+3	47
7	Hamilton Academical	36	12	11	13	35	36	−1	47

Source: "2004-2005 First Division - SPFL Archive". SPFL (in Malay).
Rules for classification: 1) points; 2) goal difference; 3) number of goals scored.

== Results and fixtures ==
Win Draw Loss

=== First Division ===
7 August 2004 SFL1	Airdrie United	1– 0	St Johnstone	Excelsior Stadium
15:00	Vareille 85'	BBC Report		Attendance: 2,365; Referee: Dallas

14 August 2004 SFL1	Partick Thistle	3– 2	Airdrie United	Firhill Stadium
15:00	Escalas 34'; Hinds 53'; Mitchell 68'	Report	Coyle 20', 66'	Attendance: 4,011; Referee: Dougal

21 August 2004 SFL1	Airdrie United	1– 1	Raith Rovers	Excelsior Stadium
15:00	McKeown 61'	Report	Sacko 6'	Attendance: 2,009; Referee: Tumilty

28 August 2004 SFL1	Falkirk	5– 0	Airdrie United	Falkirk Stadium
15:00	Thomson 9', 78'; Nicholls 25'; Lawrie 54'; Latapy 62'	BBC Report		Attendance: 3,789; Referee: Clark

4 September 2004 SFL1	Airdrie United	0– 1	Queen of the South	Excelsior Stadium
15:00		BBC Report	McLaughlin 35'	Attendance: 1,652; Referee: Smith

11 September 2004 SFL1	Clyde	1– 2	Airdrie United	Broadwood Stadium
15:00	Wilford 16'	Report	Barkey 39'; Coyle 69'	Attendance: 1,367; Referee: Murray

18 September 2004 SFL1	Airdrie United	1– 2	Ross County	Excelsior Stadium
15:00	McKeown 41' (Penalty)	Report	Canning 6'; Winters 54'	Attendance: 1,484; Referee: Conroy

25 September 2004 SFL1	St Mirren	1– 1	Airdrie United	Love Street
15:00	McGowan 17' (Own goal)	Report	Roberts 90'	Attendance: 3,500; Referee: Conroy

2 October 2004 SFL1	Airdrie United	0– 2	Hamilton Academical	Excelsior Stadium
15:00		Report	McLaughlin 70'; Tunbridge 90'	Attendance: 1,900; Referee: McDonald

16 October 2004 SFL1	Airdrie United	4– 2	Partick Thistle	Excelsior Stadium
15:00	Wilson 20'; Coyle 34', 82'; McLaren 59'	BBC Report	Madaschi 42'; Escalas 65'	Attendance: 2,548; Referee: Foy

23 October 2004 SFL1	St Johnstone	1– 1	Airdrie United	McDiarmid Park
15:00	Christie 70' (own goal)	BBC Report	Coyle 87'	Attendance: 2,500; Referee: Ritchie

30 October 2004 SFL1	Airdrie United	1– 3	Falkirk	Excelsior Stadium
15:00	Coyle 72'	BBC Report	Latapy 7'; Thomson 44'; Lawrie 76'	Attendance: 3,245; Referee: Rowbotham

6 November 2004 SFL1	Queen of the South	1– 0	Airdrie United	Palmerston Park
15:00	Bowey 53'	Report		Attendance: 2,022; Referee: Young

13 November 2004 SFL1	Airdrie United	3– 1	Clyde	Excelsior Stadium
15:00	Coyle 14'; Roberts 16'; Gow 75'	Report	Walker 81'	Attendance: 1,862; Referee: McDonald

20 November 2004 SFL1	Ross County	1– 2	Airdrie United	Victoria Park
15:00	Docherty 40' (Own goal)	Report	Hardie 16'; Lovering 86'	Attendance: 2,345; Referee: MacKay

27 November 2004 SFL1	Hamilton Academical	1– 3	Airdrie United	New Douglas Park
15:00	McPhee 11'	BBC Report	Coyle 24'; Gow 43', 78'	Attendance: 2,295; Referee: Clark

4 December 2004 SFL1	Airdrie United	3– 2	St Mirren	Excelsior Stadium
15:00	Coyle 32', 83'; Hardie 67'	BBC Report	Gillies 45'; O'Neil 66'	Attendance: 2,514; Referee: Dallas

11 December 2004 SFL1	Airdrie United	0– 0	St Johnstone	Excelsior Stadium
15:00		Report		Attendance: 1,865; Referee: Richmond

18 December 2004 SFL1	Raith Rovers	0– 2	Airdrie United	Stark's Park
15:00		BBC Report	Hardie 67'; Wilson 88'	Attendance: 1,795; Referee: Duff

26 December 2004 SFL1	Falkirk	1– 0	Airdrie United	Falkirk Stadium
15:00	Duffy 31'	BBC Report		Attendance: 4,126; Referee: Conroy

29 December 2004 SFL1	Airdrie United	2– 0	Queen of the South	Excelsior Stadium
19:45	Coyle 31'; Gow 74'	BBC Report		Attendance: 1,781; Referee: Allan

1 January 2005 SFL1	Clyde	1– 0	Airdrie United	Broadwood Stadium
15:00	Jones 78'	BBC Report		Attendance: 1,513; Referee: Young

15 January 2005 SFL1	Airdrie United	2– 1	Ross County	Excelsior Stadium
15:00	McLaren 42'; Coyle 90'	Report	Winters 60'	Attendance: 1,512; Referee: McDonald

22 January 2005 SFL1	St Mirren	1– 0	Airdrie United	Love Street
15:00	Kean 82'	Report		Attendance: 3,040; Referee: Brines

12 February 2005 SFL1	Partick Thistle	1– 1	Airdrie United	Firhill Stadium
15:00	Fleming 14'	BBC Report	McManus 24'	Attendance: 3,791; Referee: Duff

19 February 2005 SFL1	Airdrie United	2– 1	Raith Rovers	Excelsior Stadium
15:00	Wilson 27'; McKeown 86'	Report	Tulloch 38'	Attendance: 1,599; Referee: Smith

5 March 2005 SFL1	Queen of the South	0– 0	Airdrie United	Palmerston Park
15:00		BBC Report		Attendance: 1,683; Referee: Young

8 March 2005 SFL1	Airdrie United	1– 0	Hamilton Academical	Excelsior Stadium
19:45	Gow 90'	BBC Report		Attendance: 1,430; Referee: Dallas

12 March 2005 SFL1	Airdrie United	2– 2	Falkirk	Excelsior Stadium
15:00	Gow 52' (Penalty); McKeown 60'	BBC Report	Duffy 3'; James 85'	Attendance: 3,111; Referee: Cassidy

19 March 2005 SFL1	Airdrie United	2– 4	Clyde	Excelsior Stadium
15:00	Hardie 9'; Coyle 25'	ESPN Report	Harty 2' (Penalty), 34', 56'; Mensing 29'	Attendance: 1,641; Referee: Fyfe

2 April 2005 SFL1	Ross County	3– 1	Airdrie United	Victoria Park
15:00	Cowie 44'; Higgins 57', 78'	Report	Gow 2'	Attendance: 2,032; Referee: Toner

9 April 2005 SFL1	Hamilton Academical	1– 1	Airdrie United	New Douglas Park
15:00	Hardy 42'	BBC Report	Christie 44'	Attendance: 2,030; Referee: McDonald

16 April 2005 SFL1	Airdrie United	0– 2	St Mirren	Excelsior Stadium
15:00		Report	Kean 65', 76'	Attendance: 1,989; Referee: Conroy

23 April 2005 SFL1	St Johnstone	1– 2	Airdrie United	McDiarmid Park
15:00	Dobbie 58'	BBC Report	McLaren 21'; Gow 90'	Attendance: 2,239; Referee: Allan

30 April 2005 SFL1	Airdrie United	0– 1	Partick Thistle	Excelsior Stadium
15:00		BBC Report	Hinds 7'	Attendance: 1,747; Referee: McCurry

7 May 2005 SFL1	Raith Rovers	0– 1	Airdrie United	Stark's Park
15:00		Report	Gow 38' (Penalty)	Attendance: 1,296; Referee: Robinson

=== Challenge Cup ===
31 July 2004 Challenge Cup R1	Airdrie United	0–2	Queen of the South	Excelsior Stadium
15:00		Report	Wood 59'; English 80' (Penalty)	Attendance: 1,481; Referee: McCurry

=== League Cup ===
10 August 2004 League Cup R1	Airdrie United	3–0	East Fife	Excelsior Stadium
19:30	Vareille 10'; Coyle 45'; Roberts 61' (Penalty)	Report		Attendance: 1,053; Referee: McDonald

24 August 2004 League Cup R2	Airdrie United	0–1	Clyde	Excelsior Stadium
19:45		BBC Report	Wilford 73'	Attendance: 1,595; Referee: Brines

=== Scottish Cup ===
24 January 2005 Scottish Cup R3	Ross County	4–1	Airdrie United	Victoria Park
19:45	Burke 23' (Penalty); McGeown 23' (Own goal); Winters 51', 55'	Report	Hardie 40'	Attendance: 1,302; Referee: Northcroft

== Player statistics ==
=== Squad ===
No.	Pos	Nat	Player	Total		First Division		Scottish Cup		League Cup		Other^{[a]}	
No.	Pos	Nat	Player	Apps	Goals	Apps	Goals	Apps	Goals	Apps	Goals	Apps	Goals
	GK	(Scotland) SCO	Mark McGeown	34	0	30	0	1	0	2	0	1	0
	GK	(Scotland) SCO	Lee Hollis	6	0	6	0	0	0	0	0	0	0
	DF	(Scotland) SCO	Allan McManus	34	1	30	1	1	0	2	0	1	0
	DF	(Scotland) SCO	Scott Wilson	3	0	2	0	0	0	1	0	0	0
	DF	(Scotland) SCO	Stephen McKenna	9	0	8	0	1	0	0	0	0	0
	DF	(Scotland) SCO	Neil McGowan	35	0	33	0	1	0	0	0	1	0
	DF	(Scotland) SCO	Paul Lovering	34	1	30	1	1	0	2	0	1	0
	DF	(Scotland) SCO	Kevin Christie	21	1	19	1	0	0	1	0	1	0
	DF	(Scotland) SCO	Sandy Stewart	2	0	2	0	0	0	0	0	0	0
	MF	(Scotland) SCO	Willie Wilson	23	0	20	0	1	0	2	0	0	0
	MF	(Scotland) SCO	Martin Hardie	26	5	25	4	1	1	0	0	0	0
	MF	(Scotland) SCO	Stephen Docherty	30	0	28	0	0	0	2	0	0	0
	MF	(Scotland) SCO	Kevin Barkey	21	1	19	1	0	0	2	0	0	0
	MF	(Scotland) SCO	David Dunn	27	0	24	0	1	0	1	0	1	0
	MF	(Scotland) SCO	Stephen McKeown	26	4	22	4	1	0	2	0	1	0
	MF	(Scotland) SCO	Marvyn Wilson	40	3	36	3	1	0	2	0	1	0
	MF	(Scotland) SCO	Thomas Hoey	4	0	3	0	0	0	1	0	0	0
	FW	(Scotland) SCO	Steven McDougall	1	0	1	0	0	0	0	0	0	0
	FW	(Scotland) SCO	Willie McLaren	28	3	27	3	1	0	0	0	0	0
	FW	(Scotland) SCO	Mark Roberts	35	3	31	2	1	0	2	1	1	0
	FW	(Scotland) SCO	Alan Gow	29	9	26	9	0	0	2	0	1	0
	FW	(Scotland) SCO	Owen Coyle	37	15	33	14	1	0	2	1	1	0
	FW	(France) FRA	Jérôme Vareille	31	2	27	1	1	0	2	1	1	0
			Trialist	2	0	2	0	0	0	0	0	0	0

a. Includes other competitive competitions, including playoffs and the Scottish Challenge Cup.
