= Andrew Dick =

Andrew Dick may refer to:

- Andrew Dick (cricketer), Australian cricketer who played for Victoria
- Andrew Dick (footballer) (born 1986), English born Scottish football midfielder
- Andrew Dick (wrestler) (born 1976), Nigerian amateur freestyle wrestler
- Andrew D. Dick, British medical researcher
- Andy Dick (born 1965), American comedian and actor

== See also ==
- Andrew Dick-Lauder
