= 2004–05 Clyde F.C. season =

Clyde Football Club
2004–2005 season
- Manager: Billy Reid
- First Division: 3rd
- Scottish Cup: Quarter-finals
- League Cup: Third round
- Challenge Cup: Third round
- Top goalscorer: League: Ian Harty (14); All: Ian Harty (17)
- Highest home attendance: 8,000 (vs Celtic, 27 February 2005)
- Lowest home attendance: 532 (vs Forfar Athletic, 14 September 2004)
Home colours	Away colours

In the 2004–05 season, Clyde competed in their fifth consecutive season in the Scottish First Division. Billy Reid, who was assistant manager the previous season, was given the manager's job, following the departure of Alan Kernaghan.

== Transfers ==
=== May – January ===
In:

Player	From	Fee	Date
(Scotland) John Paul McKeever	Clyde Youth	Free	1 July 2004
(Scotland) Robert Harris	Clyde Youth	Free	1 July 2004
(Scotland) Paul Flaherty	Clyde Youth	Free	1 July 2004
(Scotland) Gary Arbuckle	Celtic	Free	26 July 2004
(England) Aron Wilford	Lincoln City	Free	2 August 2004
(Scotland) Gary Bollan	Motherwell	Free	6 August 2004
(England) Darren Sheridan	Oldham Athletic	Free	6 August 2004
(Algeria) Karim Kerkar	Al-Sailiya	Free	20 August 2004
(Scotland) Alex Walker	Rangers	Loan	20 August 2004
(Scotland) Eddie Malone	St Johnstone	Swap	24 August 2004
(Scotland) Aaron Conway	Dundee United	Loan	27 August 2004
(France) Jean-Louis Valois	Unattached	Free	30 August 2004
(Scotland) Scott Wilson	Airdrie United	Free	31 August 2004
(France) Mickael Marsiglia	FC Cartagena	Free	10 September 2004

Out:

Player	To	Fee	Date
(Scotland) Jack Ross	Hartlepool United	Free	24 May 2004
(Scotland) Andy Smith	Gretna	Free	24 May 2004
(Scotland) John Fraser	Stranraer	Free	24 May 2004
(Scotland) David Hagen	Peterhead	Free	24 May 2004
(Scotland) Pat Keogh	Hamilton Academical	Free	24 May 2004
(Scotland) Mark McLaughlin	Hamilton Academical	Free	24 May 2004
(Republic of Ireland) Alan Kernaghan	Livingston	Free	17 June 2004
(Scotland) Stuart McCluskey	Greenock Morton	Free	3 June 2004
(Scotland) Stephen McConalogue	St Johnstone	Free	3 June 2004
(Scotland) Colin Marshall	Aston Villa	Loan Return	24 May 2004
(Scotland) Austin McCann	Boston United	Free	3 June 2004
(Scotland) Steven Jack	Released	Free	24 May 2004
(Scotland) Steven McIntyre	Released	Free	24 May 2004
(Scotland) Alistair Martin	Released	Free	24 May 2004
(Scotland) Chris McBride	Released	Free	24 May 2004
(Scotland) Kevin Fotheringham	St Johnstone	Swap	24 August 2004
(Scotland) Paul Doyle	Montrose	Loan	27 August 2004
(Scotland) David Greenhill	Montrose	Loan	27 August 2004
(Algeria) Karim Kerkar	Dundee United	Free	31 August 2004
(France) Jean-Louis Valois	Burnley	Free	31 August 2004
(France) Mickael Marsiglia	Yverdon Sport	Free	14 October 2004

=== January – April ===
In:

Player	From	Fee	Date
(England) Graeme Jones	Bury	Free	1 January 2005
(Scotland) Alex Burns	Motherwell	Loan	7 January 2005
(Scotland) Chris Gardiner	Hearts	Loan	14 January 2005
(Scotland) David Greenhill	Montrose	Loan Return	18 February 2005
(Spain) Miguel Ángel Espínola	Unattached	Free	30 March 2005

Out:

Player	From	Fee	
(Scotland) Alex Walker	Rangers	Loan Return	1 January 2005
(England) Aron Wilford	Stalybridge Celtic	Free	1 January 2005
(Scotland) Aaron Conway	Dundee United	Loan Return	20 January 2005
(Scotland) Graeme McCracken	Cumbernauld United	Loan	20 January 2005

== Squad ==
Note: Flags indicate national team as defined under FIFA eligibility rules; some limited exceptions apply. Players may hold more than one non-FIFA nationality.

No.	Pos.	Nation	Player
—	GK	(England) ENG	Bryn Halliwell
—	GK	(Scotland) SCO	Allan Morrison
—	DF	(Scotland) SCO	Stuart Balmer
—	DF	(Scotland) SCO	Gary Bollan
—	DF	(Spain) ESP	Miguel Angel Espinola
—	DF	(Scotland) SCO	Paul Doyle
—	DF	(Scotland) SCO	Kevin Fotheringham
—	DF	(Scotland) SCO	Robert Harris
—	DF	(Germany) GER	Simon Mensing
—	DF	(Scotland) SCO	John Potter (Captain)
—	DF	(Scotland) SCO	Scott Wilson
—	MF	(Scotland) SCO	Kevin Bradley
—	MF	(Scotland) SCO	Craig Bryson
—	MF	(Scotland) SCO	Alex Burns (on loan from Motherwell)
—	MF	(Scotland) SCO	Jimmy Gibson
—	MF	(Scotland) SCO	David Greenhill

No.	Pos.	Nation	Player
—	MF	(Algeria) ALG	Karim Kerkar
—	MF	(Scotland) SCO	Eddie Malone
—	MF	(France) FRA	Mickael Marsiglia
—	MF	(Scotland) SCO	Graeme McCracken
—	MF	(Scotland) SCO	John Paul McKeever
—	MF	(England) ENG	Darren Sheridan
—	MF	(France) FRA	Jean-Louis Valois
—	MF	(Scotland) SCO	Alex Walker (on loan from Rangers)
—	FW	(Scotland) SCO	Gary Arbuckle
—	FW	(Scotland) SCO	Aaron Conway (on loan from Dundee United)
—	FW	(Scotland) SCO	Paul Flaherty
—	FW	(Scotland) SCO	Chris Gardiner (on loan from Hearts)
—	FW	(Scotland) SCO	Mark Gilhaney
—	FW	(Scotland) SCO	Ian Harty
—	FW	(England) ENG	Graeme Jones
—	FW	(England) ENG	Aron Wilford

== Results ==
Win Draw Loss

=== Scottish First Division ===
Date	Opponents	Stadium	Result F – A	Scorers	Attendance	Notes
7 August 2004	Partick Thistle	Broadwood Stadium	2–1	Harty 27', Gibson 45' (red card) 85'	3,800
14 August 2004	Raith Rovers	Starks Park	3–2	Bryson 4', Harty 42' (pen.), Potter 57'	1,784
21 August 2004	Ross County	Broadwood Stadium	1–0	Wilford 55'	1,101
28 August 2004	Queen of the South	Palmerston Park	1–0	Harty 20'	1,639
4 September 2004	St Mirren	Broadwood Stadium	0–0		2,484
11 September 2004	Airdrie United	Broadwood Stadium	1–2	Wilford 16'	1,367
18 September 2004	Hamilton Academical	New Douglas Park	1–0	Harty 16'	2,017
25 September 2004	Falkirk	Falkirk Stadium	1–1	Harty 77'	3,813
2 October 2004	St Johnstone	Broadwood Stadium	1–0	Sheridan 17'	1,456
16 October 2004	Raith Rovers	Broadwood Stadium	2–0	Conway 11', Wilson 36'	1,196
23 October 2004	Partick Thistle	Firhill Stadium	0–0		4,026
30 October 2004	Queen of the South	Broadwood Stadium	2–0	Harty 9' 38'	1,284
6 November 2004	St Mirren	St Mirren Park	0–0		3,788
13 November 2004	Airdrie United	Excelsior Stadium	1–3	Walker 81', Malone (red card)	1,862
20 November 2004	Hamilton Academical	Broadwood Stadium	2–1	Sheridan 35', Potter 90'	1,200
27 November 2004	St Johnstone	McDiarmid Park	0–3		2,026
4 December 2004	Falkirk	Broadwood Stadium	0–2	Sheridan (red card) 53'	2,864
11 December 2004	Partick Thistle	Broadwood Stadium	1–1	Bollan 20'	1,800
18 December 2004	Ross County	Victoria Park	1–0	Harty 70'	1,953
1 January 2005	Airdrie United	Broadwood Stadium	1–0	Jones 78'	1,513
15 January 2005	Hamilton Academical	New Douglas Park	1–0	Arbuckle 51'	1,873
12 February 2005	Raith Rovers	Starks Park	3–3	Harty 39' 56' (pen.) 73' (pen.)	1,394
19 February 2005	Ross County	Broadwood Stadium	1–0	Harty 52'	1,086
2 March 2005	Queen of the South	Palmerston Park	1–0	Bollan 23'	1,448
5 March 2005	St Mirren	St Mirren Park	0–0	Sheridan (red card) 89'	2,736
8 March 2005	St Mirren	Broadwood Stadium	0–0		1,002
12 March 2005	Queen of the South	Broadwood Stadium	0–1		1,060
15 March 2005	Falkirk	Falkirk Stadium	0–0		3,842
19 March 2005	Airdrie United	Excelsior Stadium	4–2	Harty 2' (pen.) 34' 56', Jones 29'	1,641
22 March 2005	St Johnstone	Broadwood Stadium	1–1	Burns 57'	1,223
2 April 2005	Hamilton Academical	Broadwood Stadium	1–3	Bryson 83'	1,235
9 April 2005	St Johnstone	McDiarmid Park	0–0		1,770
16 April 2005	Falkirk	Broadwood Stadium	0–1		1,939
23 April 2005	Partick Thistle	Firhill Stadium	0–1		2,694
30 April 2005	Raith Rovers	Broadwood Stadium	1–0	Gilhaney 28'	1,122
7 May 2005	Ross County	Victoria Park	1–1	Bryson 23'	2,130

=== Scottish Challenge Cup ===
Date	Round	Opponents	Stadium	Result F – A	Scorers	Attendance	Notes
31 August 2004	Round 2	Stranraer	Broadwood Stadium	1–0	Valois 72'	759
14 September 2004	Round 3	Forfar Athletic	Broadwood Stadium	1–2	Harty 9', Mensing (red card) 70'	532

=== Scottish League Cup ===
Date	Round	Opponents	Stadium	Result F – A	Scorers	Attendance	Notes
24 August 2004	Round 2	Airdrie United	Excelsior Stadium	1–0	Wilford 73'	1,595
21 September 2004	Round 3	Dundee United	Tannadice Park	0–4		2,336

=== Scottish Cup ===
Date	Round	Opponents	Stadium	Result F – A	Scorers	Attendance	Notes
8 January 2005	Round 3	Falkirk	Broadwood Stadium	3–0	Harty 35', 72', Bollan 68'	4,011
5 February 2005	Round 4	Ross County	Victoria Park	0–0		1,629
15 February 2005	Round 4 replay	Ross County	Broadwood Stadium	2 – 1 AET	Bryson 35', Arbuckle 93'	1,576
27 February 2005	Quarter Final	Celtic	Broadwood Stadium	0–5		8,000

== Player statistics ==
#	Player	P	Goal	Booked	Sent off (straight red)
GK	(England) Bryn Halliwell	43	0	0	0
DF	(Germany) Simon Mensing	38	0	0	1
DF	(Scotland) Gary Bollan	31	3	0	0
DF	(Scotland) Stuart Balmer	18 (1)	0	0	0
DF	(Scotland) John Potter	44	2	0	0
MF	(England) Darren Sheridan	34 (1)	2	0	2
FW	(Scotland) Gary Arbuckle	15 (18)	2	0	0
MF	(Scotland) Jimmy Gibson	35 (1)	1	0	1
FW	(England) Aron Wilford	15 (6)	3	0	0
DF	(Scotland) Kevin Fotheringham	3	0	0	0
FW	(Scotland) Ian Harty	40	17	0	0
FW	(Scotland) Mark Gilhaney	20 (19)	1	0	0
MF	(Scotland) Craig Bryson	28 (6)	3	0	0
DF	(Scotland) Paul Doyle	0 (2)	0	0	0
MF	(Scotland) David Greenhill	2 (3)	0	0	0
MF	(Algeria) Karim Kerkar	3	0	0	0
MF	(Scotland) Alex Walker	11 (6)	1	0	0
FW	(Scotland) Aaron Conway	6 (7)	1	0	0
GK	(Scotland) Allan Morrison	1 (1)	0	0	0
DF	(Scotland) Scott Wilson	20 (3)	1	0	0
MF	(Scotland) Graeme McCracken	1 (1)	0	0	0
MF	(France) Jean-Louis Valois	1	1	0	0
MF	(Scotland) Kevin Bradley	2 (15)	0	0	0
MF	(Scotland) John Paul McKeever	0 (4)	0	0	0
MF	(Scotland) Eddie Malone	30 (1)	0	0	1
MF	(France) Mickael Marsiglia	2	0	0	0
FW	(England) Graeme Jones	13 (3)	2	0	0
MF	(Scotland) Alex Burns	18 (1)	1	0	0
FW	(Scotland) Chris Gardiner	2 (5)	0	0	0
DF	(Spain) Miguel Angel Espinola	6	0	0	0
DF	(Scotland) Robert Harris	1	0	0	0
FW	(Scotland) Paul Flaherty	0	0	0	0

== League table ==
Pos	Team	Pld	W	D	L	GF	GA	GD	Pts	Promotion or relegation
1	Falkirk (C, P)	36	22	9	5	66	30	+36	75	Promotion to the Premier League
2	St Mirren	36	15	15	6	41	23	+18	60	
3	Clyde	36	16	12	8	35	29	+6	60	
4	Queen of the South	36	14	9	13	36	38	−2	51	
5	Airdrie United	36	14	8	14	44	48	−4	50	

Source: "2004-2005 First Division - SPFL Archive". SPFL (in Malay).
Rules for classification: 1) points; 2) goal difference; 3) number of goals scored.
(C) Champions; (P) Promoted
