= Paul Doyle =

Paul Doyle may refer to:

== Sport ==
- Paul Doyle (journalist), Irish sportswriter
- Paul Doyle (baseball) (1939–2020), American baseball pitcher
- Paul Doyle (Irish footballer) (born 1998)
- Paul Doyle (Scottish footballer) (born 1984)
- Paul Doyle (Gaelic footballer) (1899–1953)
- Paul Doyle (hurler), Irish hurler

== Others ==
- Paul Doyle (politician) (born 1963), American Connecticut state senator
- Paul Doyle (luthier) (d. 2026), Irish instrument maker and musician
- Paul Doyle, perpetrator of the 2025 Liverpool parade attack
