= Romauld Bouadji =

French footballer (born 1983)

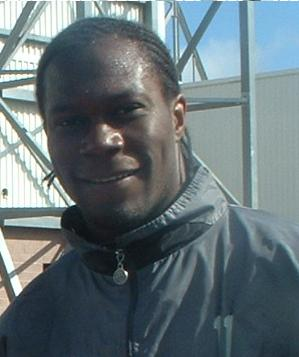

Personal information
- Full name: Romauld Bouadji
- Date of birth: 10 January 1983 (age 43)
- Place of birth: Lyon, France
- Height: 6 ft 0 in (1.83 m)
- Position: Defender

Youth career
- 1999–2001: AS Saint-Étienne

Senior career*
Years	Team	Apps	(Gls)
2001–2002	AS Saint-Étienne	0	(0)
2002–2004	Carshalton Athletic	104	(0)
2004	Gravesend & Northfleet	2	(0)
2004	Margate	9	(0)
2005	Carshalton Athletic	11	(0)
2005–2006	Clyde	13	(2)
2006–2007	Tooting & Mitcham United	31	(1)
2007	Fisher Athletic	11	(0)
2007–2008	Tooting & Mitcham United	35	(0)
2008–2009	Carshalton Athletic	7	(0)
2009–2011	Stranraer	25	(4)

International career
- France U16
- * Club domestic league appearances and goals as of 17 May 2011

Romauld Bouadji (born 10 January 1983), is a French footballer probably best known for his time with Scottish first division side Clyde. who is currently without a club. He is a central defender, but has been known on occasions to play as a sweeper and a defensive midfielder. Bouadji was capped at Under 16 level by France.

== Career ==
Bouadji started off his career at AS Saint-Étienne, before moving to England to play for Carshalton Athletic, where he played 41 times, and won Player of the Year.

The following season was very up and down, as he played for Gravesend & Northfleet, Margate & Carshalton Athletic for a second spell, all within 8 months.

In July 2005, Bouadji moved to Scotland to play under former manager Graham Roberts at Scottish Football League First Division outfit Clyde. He played in Clyde's glamour friendly against Manchester United, coming up against Wayne Rooney, Ruud van Nistelrooy and Louis Saha, and quickly became a fan's favourite. He made his competitive debut in a Scottish Challenge Cup defeat to Brechin City in July 2005, but he came off injured in this game and missed the next 3 months of the season, including Clyde's Scottish League Cup match against Rangers at Ibrox Stadium. He returned as a substitute in games against Ross County and Hamilton Academical.

Bouadji came on as a substitute in Clyde's famous Scottish Cup win over Celtic in January 2006, where he replaced Craig Bryson and surprisingly played as a holding midfield player, marking Roy Keane and Neil Lennon. He scored his first Clyde goal in February 2006 in a 5–0 win over Stranraer. Bouadji dedicated this goal to his father, who had fallen seriously ill, and made it his mission to try to get a call up to the Ivory Coast national football team.

Bouadji scored his second Clyde goal in a win over Airdrie United, and once again dedicated this goal to his dad. The next week saw Bouadji go off injured early on in a match against Hamilton Academical. This would be the last action of his Clyde career, as he was injured for the rest of the season, including the post-season tour to Canada.

Bouadji left Clyde in May 2006.

He returned to England to play for Tooting & Mitcham United, where he became an integral part of the defence, winning the Surrey Senior Cup & the London Senior Cup, finishing 2nd in the Isthmian League Division One South. Bouadji was suspended for T&M's Playoff games, which they ended up losing

He then joined Fisher Athletic in Summer 2007. He stayed there until his contract expired in November 2007. Bouadji then signed for Tooting & Mitcham United for a second time. He was released by the Terrors in October 2008, and went to join another of his former clubs, Carshalton Athletic.

On 19 October 2009, Romauld signed for south of Scotland side Stranraer, with whom he had been training, and will play in the Scottish Football League Third Division for the side against whom he scored his first goal in Scotland. Bouadji was released in May 2011.

== See also ==
- Clyde F.C. season 2005-06
