= 2009–10 Kilmarnock F.C. season =

Kilmarnock
2009–10 season
- Chairman: Michael Johnston
- Manager: Jim Jefferies (until 11 January); Jimmy Calderwood (from 14 January)
- Stadium: Rugby Park
- SPL: Eleventh Place
- Scottish Cup: Quarter-final
- League Cup: Third round
- Top goalscorer: League: Kevin Kyle (8); All: Kevin Kyle (10)
- Highest home attendance: 10,662 v Falkirk, SPL, 8 May 2010
- Lowest home attendance: 4,068 v Hamilton Academical, SPL, 24 March 2010
- Average home league attendance: 5,919
| Home colours | Away colours |

The 2009–10 season was Kilmarnock's eleventh consecutive season in the Scottish Premier League, having competed in it since its inauguration in 1998–99. Kilmarnock also competed in the Scottish Cup and the League Cup.

== Summary ==
=== Season ===
Kilmarnock finished eleventh in the Scottish Premier League with 33 points, only being spared from relegation on the final day of the season with a 0–0 draw against Falkirk. Kilmarnock also reached the third round of the League Cup, losing to St. Mirren and the quarter–final of the Scottish Cup, losing to Celtic.

== Results and fixtures ==
Kilmarnock's score comes first

Win Draw Loss Postponed

=== Scottish Premier League ===
| Match | Date | Opponent | Venue | Result | Scorers | Attendance | Report |
|---|---|---|---|---|---|---|---|
| 1 | 15 August 2009 | Hamilton Academical | H | 3–0 | Kyle 34', 52' Hamill 68' | 5,307 | BBC Sport |
| 2 | 22 August 2009 | Motherwell | A | 1–3 | Hamill 88' | 5,093 | BBC Sport |
| 3 | 29 August 2009 | St Mirren | H | 1–2 | Sammon 4' | 5,645 | BBC Sport |
| 4 | 15 September 2009 | Heart of Midlothian | A | 0–1 | | 13,328 | BBC Sport |
| 5 | 19 September 2009 | Rangers | H | 0–0 | | 10,310 | BBC Sport |
| 6 | 26 September 2009 | Falkirk | A | 0–0 | | 5,394 | BBC Sport |
| 7 | 3 October 2009 | Aberdeen | H | 1–1 | Invincible 78' | 4,997 | BBC Sport |
| 8 | 17 October 2009 | Hibernian | A | 0–1 | | 10,922 | BBC Sport |
| 9 | 24 October 2009 | St Johnstone | H | 2–1 | Kyle 51', 64' | 4,643 | BBC Sport |
| 10 | 31 October 2009 | Celtic | A | 0–3 | | 46,000 | BBC Sport |
| 11 | 7 November 2009 | Dundee United | H | 0–2 | | 4,753 | BBC Sport |
| 12 | 21 November 2009 | Rangers | A | 0–3 | | 45,358 | BBC Sport |
| 13 | 28 November 2009 | Heart of Midlothian | H | 1–2 | Bryson 90' | 4,707 | BBC Sport |
| 14 | 5 December 2009 | St Johnstone | A | 1–0 | Kyle 15' | 3,518 | BBC Sport |
| 15 | 12 December 2009 | Hibernian | H | 1–1 | Burchill 54' | 5,132 | BBC Sport |
| 16 | 19 December 2009 | Falkirk | H | 1–2 | Invincibile 8' | 4,472 | BBC Sport |
| 17 | 26 December 2009 | Dundee United | A | 0–0 | | 6,692 | BBC Sport |
| 18 | 2 January 2010 | St Mirren | A | 0–1 | | 4,917 | BBC Sport |
| 19 | 16 January 2010 | Motherwell | H | 0–3 | | 5,354 | BBC Sport |
| 20 | 23 January 2010 | Aberdeen | A | 0–1 | | 12,150 | BBC Sport |
| 21 | 26 January 2010 | Hamilton Academical | A | 0–0 | | 2,018 | BBC Sport |
| 22 | 30 January 2010 | Dundee United | H | 4–4 | Ford 20', Kyle 41', Pascali 55', Bryson 64' | 4,587 | BBC Sport |
| 23 | 2 February 2010 | Celtic | H | 1–0 | Maguire 53' | 9,308 | BBC Sport |
| 24 | 10 February 2010 | Falkirk | A | 1–0 | Bryson 58 | 7,049 | BBC Sport |
| 25 | 13 February 2010 | St Johnstone | H | 3–2 | Maguire 44', Hay 64', Kyle 77' | 4,605 | BBC Sport |
| 26 | 20 February 2010 | St Mirren | H | 1–1 | Maguire 33' | 5,501 | BBC Sport |
| 27 | 27 February 2010 | Motherwell | A | 0–1 | | 4,178 | BBC Sport |
| 28 | 6 March 2010 | Hibernian | A | 0–1 | | 10,359 | BBC Sport |
| 29 | 9 March 2010 | Rangers | H | 0–2 | | 8,906 | BBC Sport |
| 30 | 24 March 2010 | Hamilton Academical | H | 1–2 | Maguire 77' | 4,068 | BBC Sport |
| 31 | 27 March 2010 | Celtic | A | 1–3 | Bryson 73' | 41,000 | BBC Sport |
| 32 | 4 April 2010 | Aberdeen | H | 2–0 | Grassi (o.g.) 25', Russell 73' | 4,825 | BBC Sport |
| 33 | 10 April 2010 | Heart of Midlothian | A | 0–1 | | 14,015 | BBC Sport |
| 34 | 17 April 2010 | Hamilton Academical | A | 0–3 | | 2,628 | BBC Sport |
| 35 | 24 April 2010 | St Mirren | A | 0–1 | | 5,639 | BBC Sport |
| 36 | 1 May 2010 | St Johnstone | H | 1–2 | Wright 38' | 4,679 | BBC Sport |
| 37 | 5 May 2010 | Aberdeen | A | 2–1 | Kelly 69' Kyle 74' | 6,097 | BBC Sport |
| 38 | 8 May 2010 | Falkirk | H | 0–0 | | 10,662 | BBC Sport |

=== Scottish League Cup ===
| Date | Round | Opponent | Venue | Result | Attendance | Scorers |
|---|---|---|---|---|---|---|
| 25 August 2009 | Second Round | Greenock Morton | H | 3–1 | 3,645 | Sammon 24' (Pen.) 64' Kyle 90' |
| 22 September 2009 | Third Round | St Mirren | H | 1–2 | 3,561 | Kyle 87' |

=== Scottish Cup ===
| Date | Round | Opponent | Venue | Result | Attendance | Scorers |
|---|---|---|---|---|---|---|
| 18 January 2010 | Fourth Round | Falkirk | H | 1–0 | 3,378 | Pascali 83' |
| 6 February 2010 | Fifth Round | Inverness CT | H | 3–0 | 4,473 | Sammon 28' Kelly 36', 59' |
| 13 March 2010 | Quarter–Final | Celtic | H | 0–3 | 7,351 | |

== Player statistics ==
As of 8 May 2010 (UTC)

| No. | Pos | Nat | Player | Total | | Premier League | | League Cup | | Scottish Cup | |
| No. | Pos | Nat | Player | Apps | Goals | Apps | Goals | Apps | Goals | Apps | Goals |
|---|---|---|---|---|---|---|---|---|---|---|---|
| 1 | GK | (Scotland) SCO | Alan Combe | 4 | 0 | 3+0 | 0 | 1+0 | 0 | 0+0 | 0 |
| 2 | DF | (Republic of Ireland) IRL | Tim Clancy | 23 | 0 | 19+1 | 0 | 1+0 | 0 | 2+0 | 0 |
| 3 | DF | (Scotland) SCO | Garry Hay | 31 | 1 | 27+1 | 1 | 1+0 | 0 | 2+0 | 0 |
| 4 | DF | (Scotland) SCO | James Fowler | 31 | 0 | 19+9 | 0 | 0+0 | 0 | 2+1 | 0 |
| 5 | DF | (Scotland) SCO | Frazer Wright | 31 | 1 | 27+0 | 1 | 2+0 | 0 | 2+0 | 0 |
| 6 | DF | (Jamaica) JAM | Simon Ford | 25 | 1 | 21+1 | 1 | 1+0 | 0 | 2+0 | 0 |
| 7 | MF | (Scotland) SCO | Craig Bryson | 38 | 4 | 33+0 | 4 | 2+0 | 0 | 3+0 | 0 |
| 8 | MF | (Italy) ITA | Manuel Pascali | 26 | 2 | 20+2 | 1 | 1+1 | 0 | 2+0 | 1 |
| 9 | FW | (Scotland) SCO | Allan Russell | 16 | 1 | 6+8 | 1 | 0+0 | 0 | 2+0 | 0 |
| 10 | MF | (Morocco) MAR | Mehdi Taouil | 31 | 0 | 21+6 | 0 | 2+0 | 0 | 1+1 | 0 |
| 11 | FW | (Australia) AUS | Danny Invincible | 29 | 2 | 16+9 | 2 | 1+1 | 0 | 0+2 | 0 |
| 12 | MF | (England) ENG | Gavin Skelton | 24 | 0 | 14+8 | 0 | 2+0 | 0 | 0+0 | 0 |
| 13 | GK | (Scotland) SCO | Cameron Bell | 24 | 0 | 21+0 | 0 | 0+0 | 0 | 3+0 | 0 |
| 14 | DF | (New Zealand) NZL | Steven Old | 11 | 0 | 8+2 | 0 | 1+0 | 0 | 0+0 | 0 |
| 15 | DF | (Scotland) SCO | Ryan O'Leary | 12 | 0 | 10+1 | 0 | 1+0 | 0 | 0+0 | 0 |
| 16 | FW | (Scotland) SCO | Kevin Kyle | 36 | 10 | 29+3 | 8 | 2+0 | 0 | 2+0 | 2 |
| 17 | MF | (England) ENG | Graeme Owens | 7 | 0 | 1+5 | 0 | 0+0 | 0 | 0+1 | 0 |
| 18 | FW | (Republic of Ireland) IRL | Conor Sammon | 27 | 4 | 14+9 | 1 | 2+0 | 2 | 2+0 | 1 |
| 19 | MF | (Scotland) SCO | Iain Flannigan | 7 | 0 | 3+4 | 0 | 0+0 | 0 | 0+0 | 0 |
| 20 | FW | (Spain) ESP | David Fernández | 16 | 0 | 9+4 | 0 | 0+2 | 0 | 0+1 | 0 |
| 21 | GK | (England) ENG | Lee Robinson | 1 | 0 | 0+1 | 0 | 0+0 | 0 | 0+0 | 0 |
| 22 | MF | (Scotland) SCO | Liam Kelly | 17 | 3 | 13+2 | 1 | 0+0 | 0 | 2+0 | 2 |
| 23 | MF | (Scotland) SCO | Jamie Hamill | 40 | 2 | 31+4 | 2 | 2+0 | 0 | 3+0 | 0 |
| 24 | MF | (Scotland) SCO | Jamie Adams | 1 | 0 | 0+1 | 0 | 0+0 | 0 | 0+0 | 0 |
| 25 | DF | (Scotland) SCO | Scott Severin | 16 | 0 | 13+1 | 0 | 0+0 | 0 | 2+0 | 0 |
| 26 | GK | (Scotland) SCO | Mark Brown | 15 | 0 | 14+0 | 0 | 1+0 | 0 | 0+0 | 0 |
| 27 | FW | (Scotland) SCO | Mark Burchill | 17 | 1 | 9+7 | 1 | 0+0 | 0 | 1+0 | 0 |
| 28 | FW | (Scotland) SCO | Chris Maguire | 14 | 4 | 12+2 | 4 | 0+0 | 0 | 0+0 | 0 |
| 29 | DF | (Republic of Ireland) IRL | Rob Kiernan | 5 | 0 | 2+2 | 0 | 0+0 | 0 | 0+1 | 0 |
| 31 | FW | (Scotland) SCO | Daniel McKay | 0 | 0 | 0+0 | 0 | 0+0 | 0 | 0+0 | 0 |
| 33 | DF | (Scotland) SCO | Michael Doyle | 0 | 0 | 0+0 | 0 | 0+0 | 0 | 0+0 | 0 |
| 35 | MF | (Scotland) SCO | Gary Fisher | 0 | 0 | 0+0 | 0 | 0+0 | 0 | 0+0 | 0 |
| 37 | DF | (Scotland) SCO | Reid Brown | 0 | 0 | 0+0 | 0 | 0+0 | 0 | 0+0 | 0 |
| 39 | FW | (Scotland) SCO | Ross Davidson | 0 | 0 | 0+0 | 0 | 0+0 | 0 | 0+0 | 0 |
| 41 | MF | (Scotland) SCO | Callum McCluskey | 0 | 0 | 0+0 | 0 | 0+0 | 0 | 0+0 | 0 |
| 42 | FW | (Scotland) SCO | Joe Slattery | 0 | 0 | 0+0 | 0 | 0+0 | 0 | 0+0 | 0 |

== Final league table ==
| Pos | Team | Pld | W | D | L | GF | GA | GD | Pts | Qualification or relegation |
|---|---|---|---|---|---|---|---|---|---|---|
| 8 | St Johnstone | 38 | 12 | 11 | 15 | 57 | 61 | −4 | 47 | |
| 9 | Aberdeen | 38 | 10 | 11 | 17 | 36 | 52 | −16 | 41 | |
| 10 | St Mirren | 38 | 7 | 13 | 18 | 36 | 49 | −13 | 34 | |
| 11 | Kilmarnock | 38 | 8 | 9 | 21 | 29 | 51 | −22 | 33 | |
| 12 | Falkirk (R) | 38 | 6 | 13 | 19 | 31 | 57 | −26 | 31 | Relegation to the First Division |

Source: SPFL Archive
Rules for classification: 1) points; 2) goal difference; 3) number of goals scored.
(R) Relegated

=== Results by round ===
| Round | 1 | 2 | 3 | 4 | 5 | 6 | 7 | 8 | 9 | 10 | 11 | 12 | 13 | 14 | 15 | 16 | 17 | 18 | 19 | 20 | 21 | 22 | 23 | 24 | 25 | 26 | 27 | 28 | 29 | 30 | 31 | 32 | 33 | 34 | 35 | 36 | 37 | 38 |
|---|---|---|---|---|---|---|---|---|---|---|---|---|---|---|---|---|---|---|---|---|---|---|---|---|---|---|---|---|---|---|---|---|---|---|---|---|---|---|
| Ground | H | A | H | A | H | A | H | A | H | A | H | A | H | A | H | H | A | H | A | H | A | A | H | A | H | H | A | A | H | H | A | H | A | A | A | H | A | H |
| Result | W | L | L | L | D | D | D | L | W | L | L | L | L | W | D | L | D | L | L | L | D | D | W | W | W | D | L | L | L | L | L | W | L | L | L | L | W | D |
| Position | 2 | 7 | 8 | 9 | 8 | 8 | 9 | 9 | 8 | 9 | 10 | 10 | 11 | 10 | 11 | 11 | 11 | 11 | 11 | 11 | 11 | 11 | 10 | 9 | 8 | 9 | 9 | 9 | 9 | 11 | 11 | 10 | 10 | 11 | 11 | 11 | 11 | 11 |

Source: BBC Sport
A = Away; H = Home; W = Win; D = Draw; L = Loss

== Transfers ==
=== Players in ===
| Player | From | Fee |
|---|---|---|
| (England) Graeme Owens | (England) Middlesbrough | Undisclosed |
| (England) Lee Robinson | (Scotland) Rangers | Free |
| (Scotland) Mark Burchill | (England) Rotherham United | Free |
| (Scotland) Mark Brown | (Scotland) Celtic | Loan |
| (Scotland) Chris Maguire | (Scotland) Aberdeen | Loan |
| (Scotland) Scott Severin | (England) Watford | Loan |
| (Republic of Ireland) Rob Kiernan | (England) Watford | Loan |

=== Players out ===
| Player | To | Fee |
|---|---|---|
| (Scotland) Gary Locke | Retired | |
| (Scotland) David Lilley | (Scotland) Queen of the South | Free |
| (Scotland) Willie Gibson | (Scotland) Dunfermline Athletic | Nominal |
| (France) Damien Rascle | (France) Beauvais | Free |
| (Canada) Rhian Dodds | Released | Free |
| (Scotland) Grant Murray | (Scotland) Raith Rovers | Free |
| (South Africa) Chad Harpur | (South Africa) Ajax Cape Town | Free |
| (Scotland) Scott Anson | (Scotland) Annan Athletic | Free |
| (Scotland) Paul McInnes | (Scotland) Stranraer | Free |
| (Scotland) Allan Johnston | (Scotland) St Mirren | Free |
| (Scotland) Jamie Adams | (Scotland) Partick Thistle | Loan |
