= Mickaël Marsiglia =

French footballer (born 1975)

Personal information
- Full name: Mickaël Marsiglia
- Date of birth: December 25, 1975 (age 50)
- Place of birth: La Ciotat, France
- Height: 6 ft 1 in (1.85 m)
- Position: Midfielder

Team information
- Current team: Pro Impéria
- Number: 13

Senior career*
Years	Team	Apps	(Gls)
1993–1999	AS Cannes	86	(5)
1999–2000	RC Strasbourg	30	(2)
2000–2003	Olympique de Marseille	3	(0)
2001–2002	→ Racing de Ferrol (loan)	16	(0)
2003	→ Racing de Ferrol (loan)	12	(0)
2003–2004	AS Cannes		
2004	FC Cartagena		
2004	Clyde	2	(0)
2004–2006	Yverdon Sport		
2006–2007	Hapoel Petah Tikva	7	(0)
2007–2008	U.S. Imperia 1923		
2008–2009	AS Cannes	9	(0)
2009–2010	Pro Impéria		
- * Club domestic league appearances and goals as of 13:15, 8 January 2009 (UTC)

Mickaël Marsiglia (born 25 December 1975) is a former French football midfielder who is now working as the assistant manager for AS Cannes.

== Career ==
Marsiglia began his career with AS Cannes. In 2000, he was subject of a £1.75 million move to Olympique de Marseille, to replace Robert Pires.

In September 2004, Marsiglia signed a four-month contract with Scottish First Division side Clyde. However, he never really adjusted to the Scottish game, and left the club after only one month, in which he played three games.

He then went on to have spells in Switzerland, Israel and Italy, before returning to AS Cannes in 2008 for a third spell with the French outfit.

== Managerial career ==
Marsiglia joined as Manager of AS Cannes in 2016 before moving to a preferred role of Assistant Manager of Cannes in 2017, and still serves as assistant manager to this day.

== See also ==
- Clyde F.C. season 2004-05
