= Juanlu (footballer, born 1972) =

Spanish footballer

Personal information
- Full name: Juan Luis Bernal Cuéllar
- Date of birth: 7 November 1972 (age 53)
- Place of birth: Jerez de la Frontera, Spain
- Height: 1.82 m (6 ft 0 in)
- Position: Centre back

Team information
- Current team: Recreativo (assistant)

Youth career
- Betis

Senior career*
| Years | Team | Apps | (Gls) |
| 1991–1992 | Betis B | 28 | (0) |
| 1991–1996 | Betis | 28 | (0) |
| 1994–1995 | → Extremadura (loan) | 38 | (0) |
| 1995–1996 | → Écija (loan) | 25 | (1) |
| 1996–2002 | Albacete | 181 | (8) |
| 2002–2004 | Poli Ejido | 29 | (0) |
| 2004–2005 | Racing Ferrol | 5 | (0) |
| 2005 | Linense | | |
| 2005–2006 | Motril | 32 | (2) |
| 2006–2008 | Lucena | 43 | (1) |
| Total | | 409 | (12) |

International career
| 1988–1989 | Spain U16 | 16 | (0) |
| 1989–1991 | Spain U18 | 21 | (0) |
| 1991 | Spain U19 | 4 | (0) |
| 1991 | Spain U20 | 4 | (0) |
| 1992–1993 | Spain U21 | 4 | (0) |

Managerial career
- 2009–2010: Lucena (assistant)
- 2010–2011: Cultural Leonesa (assistant)
- 2012: Badajoz (assistant)
- 2012: Cádiz (assistant)
- 2013–2014: La Roda (assistant)
- 2015: Lucena
- 2016–2018: Cartagena (assistant)
- 2018–2019: Lugo (assistant)
- 2019–: Recreativo (assistant)
- * Club domestic league appearances and goals

Juan Luis Bernal Cuéllar (born 7 November 1972), commonly known as Juanlu, is a Spanish retired footballer who played as a central defender, and is the assistant coach of Recreativo de Huelva.
