= Motril CF =

Defunct Spanish association football club

Motril
- Full name: Motril Club de Fútbol
- Founded: 1984
- Dissolved: 2012
- Ground: Escribano Castilla, Motril, Andalusia, Spain
- Capacity: 4,400
- 2011–12: 3ª – Group 9, 15th
Home colours	Away colours	Third colours

Motril Club de Fútbol was a Spanish football team based in Motril, Granada, in the autonomous community of Andalusia. Founded in 1984 and dissolved in 2012, it held home matches at Estadio Escribano Castilla, with a capacity of 4,400 seats.

== History ==
The city of Motril previously had a club named Motril Club de Fútbol in the 1950s, as they played three times in Tercera División. In 1984, Motril CF were founded as a replacement to dissolved Club Deportivo Motril.

Motril first reached the Segunda División B in 1997, remaining six consecutive seasons in the category. In 2001–02 it inclusively finished the regular season in first position (in group IV), but lost in the promotion playoffs against Getafe CF, 0–1 on aggregate.

From 2003–12, Motril competed again in the fourth level, appearing in the promotion playoffs on five occasions, always without success. In July 2012 the team folded, due to heavy debts and financial difficulties.

== Season to season ==
Season	Tier	Division	Place	Copa del Rey
1984–85	5	Reg. Pref.	4th	
1985–86	5	Reg. Pref.	3rd	
1986–87	5	Reg. Pref.	3rd	
1987–88	5	Reg. Pref.	1st	
1988–89	4	3ª	8th	
1989–90	4	3ª	9th	
1990–91	4	3ª	5th	
1991–92	4	3ª	8th	First round
1992–93	4	3ª	19th	
1993–94	5	Reg. Pref.	3rd	
1994–95	5	Reg. Pref.	1st	
1995–96	4	3ª	4th	
1996–97	4	3ª	1st	
1997–98	3	2ª B	16th	First round

Season	Tier	Division	Place	Copa del Rey
1998–99	3	2ª B	10th	
1999–2000	3	2ª B	10th	
2000–01	3	2ª B	15th	
2001–02	3	2ª B	1st	
2002–03	3	2ª B	20th	Round of 32
2003–04	4	3ª	2nd	
2004–05	4	3ª	8th	
2005–06	4	3ª	3rd	
2006–07	4	3ª	4th	
2007–08	4	3ª	9th	
2008–09	4	3ª	3rd	
2009–10	4	3ª	2nd	
2010–11	4	3ª	8th	
2011–12	4	3ª	15th	

- 6 seasons in Segunda División B
- 16 seasons in Tercera División

== Former players ==
- (Argentina) Pablo Paz
- (Spain) Noé Acosta
- (Spain) Enrique
- (Spain) Miguel Ángel Espínola
- (Spain) Javi Guerra
- (Spain) Juanlu
- (Spain) Armando Lozano
- (Spain) Luis Rubiales
- (Spain) Chupi
- (Spain) Dani Cara
- (Spain) Francisco Javier Linares Sánchez
- (Spain) Manuel Lucena
- (Spain) Rafael Wellington
- (Spain) Julio Caraffo
