= John Paul McKeever =

Scottish footballer

Personal information
- Full name: John Paul McKeever
- Date of birth: 18 November 1987 (age 38)
- Place of birth: Glasgow, Scotland
- Position: Midfielder

Team information
- Current team: Kirkintilloch Rob Roy

Youth career
- Clyde

Senior career*
Years	Team	Apps	(Gls)
2004–2006	Clyde	3	(0)
2006–2007	Dumbarton	7	(0)
2007–2008	Bellshill Athletic		
2008–	Kirkintilloch Rob Roy		
- * Club domestic league appearances and goals as of 14:18, 18 May 2008 (UTC)

John Paul McKeever (born 18 November 1987 in Glasgow), is a Scottish football midfielder who plays for Kirkintilloch Rob Roy.

== Career ==
McKeever started his career with Clyde. He was captain of the Under 19 side, and made his senior debut in a Scottish Challenge Cup match against Stranraer in August 2004, coming on as a late substitute. He only made a handful of appearances after this, and was released in January 2006.

He joined Dumbarton after his release from Clyde, and stayed until May 2007, when he joined junior side Bellshill Athletic. He signed for Kirkintilloch Rob Roy in January 2008.

== See also ==
- Clyde F.C. season 2004-05 | 2005-06
