= Jean-Louis Valois =

French retired professional footballer (born 1973)

Personal information
- Full name: Jean-Louis Valois
- Date of birth: 15 October 1973 (age 53)
- Place of birth: Saint-Priest, Metropolis of Lyon, France
- Height: 1.80 m (5 ft 11 in)
- Position: Winger

Senior career*
| Years | Team | Apps | (Gls) |
| 1994–1995 | Saint-Priest | ? | (?) |
| 1995–1996 | Lyon Duchère | ? | (?) |
| 1996–1997 | Auxerre | 2 | (0) |
| 1997–1998 | Gueugnon | 39 | (11) |
| 1998–2001 | Lille | 50 | (10) |
| 2001–2002 | Luton Town | 34 | (6) |
| 2002–2004 | Heart of Midlothian | 49 | (2) |
| 2004 | Almería | 8 | (0) |
| 2004 | Clyde | 0 | (0) |
| 2004–2005 | Burnley | 30 | (3) |
| 2005–2006 | Al Khaleej | ? | (?) |
| 2006–2007 | Al Nasr | ? | (?) |
| 2013–14 | C.D. Roquetas | | |
| 2014 | E.F. Alhama | | |
| 2014–15 | C.D. Minera | | |
| 2017–19 | Olímpico de Totana | | |
- * Club domestic league appearances and goals

Jean-Louis Valois (French pronunciation: [ʒɑ̃ lwi valwa]; born 15 October 1973 in Saint-Priest) is a French retired professional footballer. A left-sided player capable of playing on either wing, his last senior club was Al-Nasr Dubai.

== Career ==
Valois began his professional career under the tutelage of renowned coach Guy Roux at AJ Auxerre but was unable to command a first-team position in Burgundy, and opted for a move to Ligue 2 side Gueugnon in 1997. Three years later he moved north to join Lille Olympique before crossing the English Channel in September 2001, when he signed for League Two side Luton Town.

Valois enjoyed an impressive 2001–02 season with the Hatters, helping them to clinch promotion – one highlight being his debut game at Kenilworth Road, a 5–1 victory over Torquay United. Displaying immense skill, flair & ability far and above the English third division, Jean Louis netted a 30-yard strike into the top corner in one of the finest ever Luton Town debuts. Further spectacular goals followed that season against Leyton Orient and Hartlepool. However, a dispute with manager Joe Kinnear saw him leave for SPL side Hearts in August 2002 on a free transfer. An explosive start saw him named Man of the Match on his Tynecastle debut, a 5–1 defeat of city-rivals Hibernian, despite fellow debutant Mark de Vries scoring 4 goals. Valois maintained this form during the remainder of the 2002–03 season as Hearts achieved European qualification, however an indifferent period in early 2003–04 led to his release in January 2004.

Spain was Valois' next port of call, although when his 6-month contract with UD Almería was not renewed in the summer of 2004 the mercurial Frenchmen returned to Britain. After a month with Clyde, where he scored once in the Scottish Challenge Cup against Stranraer, he signed for Championship side Burnley in September, with whom he stayed until May 2005.

After leaving Burnley, Jean-Louis made the move to the United Arab Emirates and a lucrative contract with UAE Second Division side Al-Khaleej. Departing in June 2006, Jean-Louis joined Al Nasr – which he left in June 2007.

After four years of inactivity, Valois turned out for Cheltenham Town's reserve team on 23 August 2011 in a friendly match away against Coventry City. However, according to Cheltenham he was just training and was not in contention to be offered a contract.

== Personal ==
Jean Louis mentioned in an interview while at Luton Town his dream clubs to play for were Barcelona and Real Madrid, describing both teams as 'mythical'.

== Personal awards and achievements ==
- Scottish Premier League Player of the Month: September 2002

== See also ==
- Clyde F.C. season 2004-05
