= Tom Brighton =

Scottish footballer

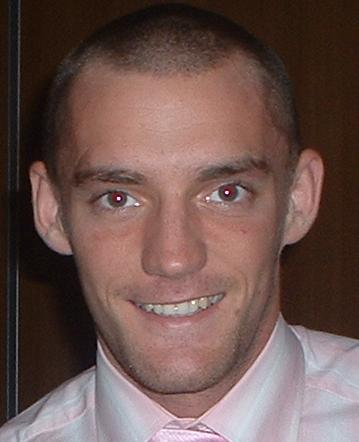

Personal information
- Full name: Thomas Brighton
- Date of birth: 28 March 1984 (age 42)
- Place of birth: Irvine, Scotland
- Height: 5 ft 10 in (1.78 m)
- Position: Striker

Team information
- Current team: Irvine Meadow

Senior career*
Years	Team	Apps	(Gls)
2001–2005	Rangers	1	(0)
2004	→ Scunthorpe United (loan)	2	(0)
2005–2006	Clyde	36	(7)
2006–2008	Millwall	16	(1)
2008–2010	St Mirren	13	(1)
2011	Dundee (trialist)	3	(0)
2011	Stirling Albion	13	(0)
2011–2012	Queen of the South	21	(4)
2012–2013	Irvine Meadow	45	(3)

International career
2004–2006	Scotland U21	6	(0)
- * Club domestic league appearances and goals as of 15 August 2012

Tom Brighton (born 28 March 1984) is a Scottish professional footballer, who played as a centre forward.

== Early life ==
Brighton was educated at Marr College in Troon.

== Career ==
Brighton began his career at Rangers, where he played only one game, before going to Scunthorpe United for a short loan spell. He was released from his contract with Rangers in June 2005.

He played in the Scottish Youth Cup final in 2002. Rangers defeated Ayr United 4–2 at New Douglas Park, with Brighton assisting Rangers' last goal.

He was then recruited by Clyde during the close season and made his debut in the opening league game against Ross County. Brighton was voted Man of the Match in Clyde's Scottish Cup shock win over Celtic. He left Clyde in 2006 after manager Graham Roberts was accused of racist remarks during a pre-season tour of Canada.

Brighton moved to Millwall in June 2006. His time at Millwall was however disrupted by several injuries.

On 8 May 2008 it was announced that Brighton had signed a pre-contract with St Mirren. Brighton's contract was not renewed at the end of the 2009–10 season.

He signed for Stirling Albion in February 2011. It was announced he was to be released from his contract on 15 May 2011.

Queen of the South manager, Gus MacPherson, having known Brighton from his time as St Mirren manager, offered him training facilities during the summer of 2011 and he also played him in a few pre-season friendlies. Brighton was then offered a contract on 21 July 2011 with Queens which he accepted. His debut was on 23 July 2011 the extra time 2–0 defeat away at Ayr United in the 2011–12 Scottish Challenge Cup. Tom scored a 78th-minute winner against Stranraer in his second start.

Brighton left Queens for Junior side Irvine Meadow in July 2012. In June 2013 it was announced that he had left the club.

== See also ==
- 2001–02 Rangers F.C. season | 2002–03 | 2003–04 | 2004–05
- 2005–06 Clyde F.C. season
- 2008–09 St Mirren F.C. season
