= Gordon Parks (footballer) =

Scottish footballer and sports journalist

Personal information
- Full name: Gordon John Parks
- Date of birth: 9 November 1972 (age 53)
- Place of birth: Glasgow, Scotland
- Position: Striker

Senior career*
Years	Team	Apps	(Gls)
1990–1992	Dundee United	0	(0)
1992–1997	Clyde	49	(10)
1997	Dumbarton	4	(0)
1997–1998	East Stirlingshire	21	(1)
1998–1999	Queen's Park	20	(1)
2004–2005	East Stirlingshire	9	(0)
2005	Clyde	0	(0)
Total		103	(12)
- * Club domestic league appearances and goals

Gordon John Parks (born 9 November 1972) is a Scottish sports journalist and a former footballer.

== Playing career ==
Parks began his career with Dundee United, but failed to make a first team appearance. He joined Clyde in 1992, and after impressing in the Reserve team, he was promoted to the first team for the 1993-94 campaign. He scored 10 goals for the first team in his first two seasons. He broke his leg in a Scottish League Cup match at the start of the 1995–95 season. Parks was out injured for over a year, and never really recovered fully from his injury. He made two more appearances, before signing for Dumbarton.

Parks only made eight appearances for Dumbarton, before joining East Stirlingshire. He went on to have a spell with Queen's Park, before dropping out of the senior game to play junior football with Lesmahagow and Dunipace.

In 2004, he returned to former club East Stirlingshire, before rejoining Clyde in 2005, although he never played for the first team.

== Journalism ==
During his time playing in the juniors, Parks became a sports journalist, and worked for the Daily Record. In a combined role as a player and journalist, he described the goings on at Firs Park in his weekly column Parks Life.

Parks has since returned to journalism, writing for the Daily Record.

== See also ==
- Clyde F.C. season 2005-06
