= Chris Gardiner =

Scottish footballer

Personal information
- Full name: Christopher Gardiner
- Date of birth: 5 January 1986 (age 40)
- Place of birth: Bellshill, Scotland
- Height: 6 ft 0 in (1.83 m)
- Position: Striker

Senior career*
Years	Team	Apps	(Gls)
2002–2005	Heart of Midlothian	0	(0)
2005	→ Clyde (loan)	7	(0)
2005–2007	Elgin City	50	(4)
2007–2009	Shotts Bon Accord	55	(16)
- * Club domestic league appearances and goals as of 20:27, 28 August 2008 (UTC)

Christopher Gardiner (born 5 January 1986 in Bellshill) is a Scottish football striker. Gardiner began his career with Heart of Midlothian, but failed to make an appearance for the first team. He had a 6-month loan spell with Clyde in 2005. He left Hearts in July 2005, and joined Elgin City, where he stayed for two seasons, before dropping out of the senior game to sign for Shotts Bon Accord.

== See also ==
- Clyde F.C. season 2004-05
