= Aron Wilford =

English footballer (born 1982)

Personal information
- Full name: Aron Leslie Wilford
- Date of birth: 14 January 1982 (age 44)
- Place of birth: Scarborough, England
- Positions: Defender; forward

Team information
- Current team: Oakleigh Cannons

Senior career*
Years	Team	Apps	(Gls)
1999–2002	Middlesbrough	0	(0)
2001–2002	→Scarborough (loan)	10	(1)
2001–2003	Whitby Town		
2003–2004	York City	6	(2)
2003–2004	→Worksop Town (loan)	3	(0)
2003–2004	→Harrogate Town (loan)	6	(0)
2004	Lincoln City	5	(1)
2004	Clyde	19	(2)
2005	Stalybridge Celtic	17	(5)
	Barrow	?	(?)
- Whitby Town
2006–2007	Blyth Spartans	10	(3)
2007–2008	Guiseley	?	(?)
2008	Southern Stars	?	(?)
2009–2010	Dandenong Thunder	0	(0)
2011–2013	Bentleigh Greens	43	(2)
2014–2017	Oakleigh Cannons	73	(2)
- * Club domestic league appearances and goals as of 04:52, 29 September 2017 (UTC)

Aron Leslie Wilford (born 14 January 1982) is an English footballer who plays for Oakleigh Cannons. He played professionally in the Football League for York City and Lincoln City and in the Scottish Football League for Clyde.

== Career ==
Wilford began his career as a centre-half for Middlesbrough, signing for the club from Harrogate College in the summer of 1999. In September 2001 he joined Scarborough on loan, making his debut in the 2–1 home defeat to Hayes on 8 September 2001 and going on to spend two months with the Seasiders. Returning to Boro, he was one of four youngsters, the others being Steve Baker, Gerard Robinson and Paul Stephenson, released by manager Steve McClaren at the end of November 2001.

Wilford signed for Whitby Town from Malton, debuting against Bradford Park Avenue on 9 January 2002. He remained with the club until September 2003 when he joined York City, scoring on his Football League debut just three minutes after coming on as a substitute in the 2–1 defeat to Rochdale on 6 September 2003. In December 2003 he joined Worksop Town on loan for a month. In February, he joined Harrogate Town on loan, debuting in the 0–0 draw at Frickley Athletic on 14 February 2004. His contract with York was cancelled by mutual consent in March 2004 and he swiftly joined Lincoln City.

=== Whitby Town and Blyth Spartans ===
In March 2007 he asked to leave Whitby and manager Lee Nogan agreed to his request. He linked up with his former Whitby manager Harry Dunn at Blyth Spartans, debuting in the 2–0 Football Conference North home victory over Worksop Town on 10 March 2007. He played in ten of the clubs' remaining eleven league fixtures scoring three goals, his first in the 2–0 victory at Barrow on 31 March 2007 and his final goal in the closing league game of the season a 3–1 home victory over Hinckley United on 28 April 2007, as the Spartans narrowly missed out on the end of season play-offs finishing in seventh place in their inaugural Conference North campaign.

=== Guiseley ===
Wilford trained with Guiseley during the summer of 2007 before agreeing a deal to link up with his former York City manager Terry Dolan at the club, debuting in the 3–2 Northern Premier League away victory over Stamford on 18 August 2007. Although Guiseley started the season well Dolan was surprisingly sacked in November, with Steve Kittrick appointed in his place leading to a large overhaul in the squad. Although Wilford won the club's fair play award at the end of the season he was one of six players to depart the club following Kittrick's decision to restructure the budget.

=== Australia ===
Wilford moved to Australia, joining Southern Stars during the 2008 Victorian State League Division 1 season before moving to Victorian Premier League side Dandenong Thunder for the 2009 season. In October 2010, he decided not to renew his contract with Dandenong Thunder instead moving to Bentleigh Greens for the 2011 Victorian Premier League season.

== See also ==
- Clyde F.C. season 2004-05
