= Miguel Ángel Espínola =

Spanish footballer

Personal information
- Full name: Miguel Ángel Espínola Jiménez
- Date of birth: 5 April 1974 (age 52)
- Place of birth: Guadix, Spain
- Height: 1.80 m (5 ft 11 in)
- Position: Right back

Senior career*
Years	Team	Apps	(Gls)
1994–1995	Guadix		
1995–1996	Motril		
1996–1997	Guadix	36	(4)
1997–1998	Manchego	35	(1)
1998–1999	Almería	35	(2)
1999–2000	Linense	33	(1)
2000–2003	Recreativo	110	(2)
2003–2004	Algeciras	29	(0)
2004–2005	Clyde	6	(0)
2005–2006	Granada		
- * Club domestic league appearances and goals

Miguel Ángel Espínola Jiménez (born 5 April 1974) is a Spanish retired professional footballer who played as a right back.

== Club career ==
Born in Guadix, Province of Granada, Espínola played mostly in his native Andalusia. In his first decade as a senior he represented Guadix CF, Motril CF, Manchego CF, UD Almería, Real Balompédica Linense, Recreativo de Huelva and Algeciras CF.

With Recre, Espínola competed in La Liga in 2002–03, starting in 28 of his 31 appearances as the season ended in relegation for the oldest club in Spain. On 15 December 2002, he scored his only goal to put the visitors ahead 2–0 at Real Madrid, but his team eventually finished with ten men and lost 4–2, with him being placed as a goalkeeper following José Antonio Luque's dismissal and not being able to stop the subsequent penalty by Luís Figo.

In 2004–05, Espínola played in Scotland for Clyde. He returned to his homeland in the summer of 2005, for one final campaign with Granada CF in Tercera División.
