= Graeme McCracken =

Scottish footballer

Personal information
- Date of birth: 23 July 1986 (age 40)
- Place of birth: Coatbridge, Scotland
- Position: Midfielder

Youth career
- Clyde

Senior career*
Years	Team	Apps	(Gls)
2002–2005	Clyde	1	(0)
2005	→ Cumbernauld Utd (loan)		
2005–2006	Cumbernauld Utd		
2006–2007	Cambuslang Rangers		
- * Club domestic league appearances and goals

Graeme McCracken (born 23 July 1986) is a Scottish former footballer who played as a midfielder.

== Career ==
McCracken started his career with Clyde, being on a YTS contract between 2002 and 2004, before signing his first professional contract in July 2004. He made his senior debut in a Scottish Challenge Cup match against Stranraer in August 2004. He only made a couple more appearances after this, and was loaned to local junior outfit Cumbernauld United in January 2005.

He was released by Clyde in May 2005, and joined Cumbernauld permanently. He spent a season there, before joining Cambuslang Rangers for the 2006–07 season. He then joined an amateur club in Coatbridge called Burnbank Amateurs F.C. Who Former St. Johnstone and Albion Rovers Player Robert Greenock used to play for.

== See also ==
- 2004–05 Clyde F.C. season
