= Andy Lawrie =

Scottish footballer

Personal information
- Full name: Andrew Lawrie
- Date of birth: 24 November 1978 (age 47)
- Place of birth: Galashiels, Scotland
- Height: 6 ft 0 in (1.83 m)
- Position: Defender

Senior career*
Years	Team	Apps	(Gls)
1996–2006	Falkirk	218	(21)
1999	→ East Fife (loan)	13	(1)
2006–2008	St. Johnstone	38	(2)
2008–2009	Stirling Albion	26	(0)
- * Club domestic league appearances and goals as of 17:56, 14 May 2009 (UTC)

Andrew Lawrie (born 24 November 1978) is a Scottish former footballer, who played as a defender.

Lawrie joined St. Johnstone in June 2006, signing a three-year contract. He scored his first goal for St. Johnstone in a 3-2 defeat at Livingston on 13 January 2007.

== Honours ==
Falkirk

- Scottish Division One champions: 2002–03, 2004–05
