= Andrew Dick (cricketer) =

Australian cricketer

Personal information
- Full name: Andrew M. Dick

Domestic team information
- Years: Team
- 1853/54: Victoria
- Only First-class: 3 March 1854 Victoria v Tasmania

Career statistics
Competition	First-class
Matches	1
Runs scored	4
Batting average	2.00
100s/50s	0/0
Top score	3
Balls bowled	16
Wickets	1
Bowling average	17.00
5 wickets in innings	0
10 wickets in match	0
Best bowling	1/17
Catches/stumpings	0/0
- Source: CricketArchive, 13 October 2011

Andrew Dick was an Australian cricketer who played for Victoria.

Dick made a single first-class appearance for the side, during the 1853–54 season, in just the fourth first-class match the team ever played. He scored three runs in the first innings and a single run in the second.
