= Andrew D. Dick =

British ophthalmologist

Andrew D. Dick is Executive Dean of the Faculty of Brain Sciences at University College London (UCL) and Duke Elder Chair of Ophthalmology. He is also Professor of Ophthalmology at the University of Bristol, co-Director of NIHR Biomedical Research Centre at Moorfields Eye Hospital and UCL Institute of Ophthalmology, as well as non-executive director at Moorfields Eye Hospital. On 1 May 2026 it was announced that UCL has appointed Professor Andrew Dick as new Dean of the Faculty of Brain Sciences, effective from September 2026.

== Career ==
Andrew Dick studied medicine (MBBS) with a degree in Biochemistry BSc (Hons) from Charing Cross and Westminster Medical School and the University of London. He took up Clinical Senior Lectureship at the University of Aberdeen until his move to the University of Bristol in 2000 as Chair and Professor of Ophthalmology. Since 2016 he has been Director of Joint Research for UCL Institute of Ophthalmology and Duke Elder Chair of Ophthalmology, UCL. In 2007 Professor Dick was awarded the Fellowship of Academy of Medical Sciences.

== Research ==
Andrew's important contributions to science come from his early research on cytokines and mechanisms of tissue damage, including TNFalpha and the role of microglia in ocular inflammation (uveitis) and age-related macular degeneration (AMD). The work has delivered new insights into the pathogenesis as well as new approaches to the treatment of this group of blinding diseases. During the 1990s, he was one of the pioneering contributors to the global implementation of biologic therapy for uveitis in ophthalmology. As of April 2026 Andrew has an h-index of 89, and 341 publications that have been cited.

== Awards ==
In 2023 Andrew Dick received the Fellowship of European association for Vision and Eye Research (EVER) and Gold Fellowship of Association for Research in Vision and Ophthalmology (ARVO). He served as President of the EVER Association in 2017 and as Vice President of ARVO in 2019.
