= Paul Doyle (Scottish footballer) =

Scottish footballer

Personal information
- Full name: Paul Doyle
- Date of birth: 26 September 1984 (age 42)
- Place of birth: Bellshill, Scotland
- Position: Defender

Youth career
- 2000–2001: Clyde

Senior career*
Years	Team	Apps	(Gls)
2001–2005	Clyde	9	(0)
2002	→ Larkhall Thistle (loan)		
2004–2005	→ Montrose (loan)	26	(2)
2005–2006	Montrose	22	(0)
2006–2007	East Fife	11	(0)
2007–2008	East Stirlingshire	16	(1)
- * Club domestic league appearances and goals as of 19:44, 14 October 2007 (UTC)

Paul Doyle (born 26 September 1984 in Bellshill) is a Scottish football defender.

Doyle came through the Clyde youth system, and captained the Under 18 and Under 19 sides. He made his senior debut coming on as a substitute on the last day of 2002-03 season, in a match against Arbroath. He made eight appearances the following season, mainly as a sub.

In season 2004-05, he was sent out on loan to Montrose for the full season. This move was made permanent in July 2005.

He then spent a year at East Fife, before joining East Stirlingshire in July 2007.

== See also ==
- Clyde F.C. season 2004-05
