= Andrew Dick (footballer) =

English footballer

Personal information
- Full name: Andrew James Dick
- Date of birth: 25 February 1986 (age 40)
- Place of birth: Carlisle, England
- Height: 6 ft 1 in (1.85 m)
- Position: Midfielder

Senior career*
Years	Team	Apps	(Gls)
2003–2005	Rangers	0	(0)
2005	Falkirk	0	(0)
2005–2006	Clyde	7	(0)
2006–2008	Linlithgow Rose		
2008–2011	Camelon		
- * Club domestic league appearances and goals

Andrew James Dick (born 25 February 1986 in Carlisle) is an English footballer, who played in the Scottish Football League for Clyde.
