= Allan Morrison (footballer) =

Scottish footballer

Personal information
- Date of birth: 31 March 1982 (age 44)
- Position: Goalkeeper

Senior career*
| Years | Team | Apps | (Gls) |
| 1996–2002 | Celtic | 5 | (0) |
| 2002 | Carlisle United | 28 | (0) |
| 2002–2005 | Clyde | 79 | (0) |
| 2005–2007 | Stranraer | 48 | (0) |
- Glenafton Athletic
| Total | | 160 | (0) |
- * Club domestic league appearances and goals

Allan James Morrison (born 31 March 1982) is a Scottish former professional footballer who played as a goalkeeper.

== Career ==
Morrison played for Celtic, Carlisle United, Clyde, Stranraer and Glenafton Athletic. In May 2004 he was initially told by Clyde that he could not stay at the club as they could not afford to pay his wages.

In November 2012 he was working as a goalkeeping coach at Ayr United.

As a Celtic youth team player, Morrison played in the 2001 Scottish Youth Cup final, which Aberdeen won 2–0 at Hampden Park.
