= Scott Wilson (footballer, born 1982) =

Scottish footballer

Personal information
- Full name: Scott William Wilson
- Date of birth: 20 April 1982 (age 44)
- Place of birth: Bellshill, Scotland
- Height: 5 ft 3 in (1.60 m)
- Position: Defender

Team information
- Current team: Glenafton Athletic

Senior career*
Years	Team	Apps	(Gls)
1999–2002	Motherwell	0	(0)
2002–2004	Airdrie United	35	(1)
2004–2005	Clyde	20	(1)
2005–2006	Raith Rovers	6	(0)
2006	Brechin City	4	(0)
2006–2007	Stranraer	15	(1)
2007–2011	Linlithgow Rose		
2011–	Glenafton Athletic		
- * Club domestic league appearances and goals

Scott William Wilson (born 20 April 1982 in Bellshill), is a Scottish footballer who plays for Glenafton Athletic.

== Career ==
Wilson began his career with Motherwell, but was released along with 19 others when the club went into administration. Wilson went on to sign for Airdrie United, making 39 appearances for the Diamonds before joining Clyde in 2004.

He then had a 6-month spell with Raith Rovers, which was blighted by injury, before joining Brechin City. He played for Stranraer for the 2007–08 season, before dropping out of the senior game to join Linlithgow Rose.

On 14 January 2011 he left Linlithgow Rose. He then joined Glenafton Athletic.

== See also ==
- Clyde F.C. season 2004-05
