= 2004–05 Scottish First Division =

Scottish First Division
- Season: 2004–05
- Champions: Falkirk
- Promoted: Falkirk
- Relegated: Partick Thistle, Raith Rovers
- Goals scored: 507
- Average goals/game: 2.82
- Top goalscorer: Darryl Duffy (17)
- Biggest home win: Falkirk 5–0 Airdrie United, 28.08.2004
- Biggest away win: Partick Thistle 0–4 St Johnstone, 04.12.2004; Partick Thistle 0–4 St Johnstone, 16.04.2005

The 2004–05 Scottish First Division was won by Falkirk.

As league champions, Falkirk were promoted to the Scottish Premier League. Partick Thistle and Raith Rovers were relegated to the Second Division, and Second Division winners Brechin City and Stranraer were promoted.

== League table ==
Pos	Team	Pld	W	D	L	GF	GA	GD	Pts	Promotion or relegation
1	Falkirk (C, P)	36	22	9	5	66	30	+36	75	Promotion to the Premier League
2	St Mirren	36	15	15	6	41	23	+18	60	
3	Clyde	36	16	12	8	35	29	+6	60	
4	Queen of the South	36	14	9	13	36	38	−2	51	
5	Airdrie United	36	14	8	14	44	48	−4	50	
6	Ross County	36	13	8	15	40	37	+3	47	
7	Hamilton Academical	36	12	11	13	35	36	−1	47	
8	St Johnstone	36	12	10	14	38	39	−1	46	
9	Partick Thistle (R)	36	10	9	17	38	52	−14	39	Relegation to the Second Division
10	Raith Rovers (R)	36	3	7	26	26	67	−41	16	Relegation to the Second Division

Source: "2004-2005 First Division - SPFL Archive". SPFL (in Malay).
Rules for classification: 1) points; 2) goal difference; 3) number of goals scored.
(C) Champions; (P) Promoted; (R) Relegated

== Top scorers ==
Scorer	Team	Goals
(Scotland) Darryl Duffy	Falkirk	17
(Scotland) Ian Harty	Clyde	15
(Republic of Ireland) Owen Coyle	Airdrie United	14
(Australia) Daniel McBreen	Falkirk	13
(Scotland) David McNiven	Queen of the South	12
(Scotland) Peter MacDonald	St Johnstone	11
(Scotland) Alan Gow	Airdrie United	9
(Scotland) Andy Thomson	Falkirk	9
(Trinidad and Tobago) Russell Latapy	Falkirk	7
(Scotland) Derek Lyle	Queen of the South	7
(Scotland) John O'Neill	St Mirren	7

== Attendances ==
The average attendances for Scottish First Division clubs for season 2004/05 are shown below:

Club	Average
Falkirk	3,935
Partick Thistle	3,455
St Mirren	3,252
St Johnstone	2,414
Ross County	2,336
Hamilton Academical	2,103
Airdrie United	2,014
Queen of the South	1,959
Raith Rovers	1,754
Clyde	1,596
