= 1996–97 Motherwell F.C. season =

Motherwell
1996–97 season
- Manager: Alex McLeish
- Premier Division: 8th
- Scottish Cup: Quarter-finals
- League Cup: Second round
- Top goalscorer: League: Tommy Coyne (11); All: Tommy Coyne (11)

The 1996–97 season was Motherwell's 12th consecutive season in the Scottish Premier Division, the top division of Scottish Football.

== Season events ==
Motherwell started the season with pre-season friendlies in England against Southend United, Baldock Town and Blyth Spartans. Motherwell lost to Southend United, defeated Baldock Town and Blyth Spartans before returning to Fir Park to face Portuguese giants Porto, losing 1–0.

== Squad ==
As of match played 10 May 1997

No.	Name	Nationality	Position	Date of birth (age)	Signed from	Signed in	Contract ends	Apps.	Goals
Goalkeepers
	Scott Howie	(Scotland)	GK	4 January 1972 (aged 25)	Norwich City	1994			
	Stevie Woods	(Scotland)	GK	23 February 1970 (aged 27)	Preston North End	1994			
Defenders
	Mitchell van der Gaag	(Netherlands)	DF	22 October 1971 (aged 25)	PSV Eindhoven	1995			
	Stephen Craigan	(Northern Ireland)	DF	29 October 1976 (aged 20)	Blantyre Victoria	1995			
	Kevin Christie	(Scotland)	DF	1 April 1976 (aged 21)	East Fife	1997			
	Greig Denham	(Scotland)	DF	5 October 1976 (aged 20)	Youth team	1994			
	Brian Martin	(Scotland)	DF	24 February 1963 (aged 34)	St Mirren	1991			
	Eddie May	(Scotland)	DF	30 August 1967 (aged 29)	Falkirk	1994			
	David McCallum	(Scotland)	DF	7 September 1977 (aged 19)	Bearsden BC	1995			
	Chris McCart	(Scotland)	DF	17 April 1967 (aged 30)	Youth team	1985			
	Steve McMillan	(Scotland)	DF	19 January 1976 (aged 21)	Troon	1993			
	John Philliben	(Scotland)	DF	14 March 1964 (aged 33)	Doncaster Rovers	1986			
	Fraser Wishart	(Scotland)	DF	1 March 1965 (aged 32)	Heart of Midlothian	1996			
Midfielders
	Joni Lehtonen	(Finland)	MF	30 September 1973 (aged 23)	Ilves	1996			
	Simo Valakari	(Finland)	MF	28 April 1973 (aged 24)	FinnPa	1996			
	Billy Davies	(Scotland)	MF	31 May 1964 (aged 32)	Dunfermline Athletic	1993			
	Lee McCulloch	(Scotland)	MF	14 May 1978 (aged 18)	Youth team	1994		21	0
	Shaun McSkimming	(Scotland)	MF	29 May 1970 (aged 26)	Kilmarnock	1994			
	Ian Ross	(Scotland)	MF	27 August 1974 (aged 22)	Youth team	1995			
	Mickey Weir	(Scotland)	MF	16 January 1966 (aged 31)	Hibernian	1996			
Forwards
	Owen Coyle	(Republic of Ireland)	FW	14 July 1966 (aged 30)	Dundee United	1997			
	Tommy Coyne	(Republic of Ireland)	FW	14 November 1962 (aged 34)	Tranmere Rovers	1993			
	Roy Essandoh	(Northern Ireland)	FW	17 February 1976 (aged 21)	Cumbernauld United	1994			
	Dougie Arnott	(Scotland)	FW	5 August 1964 (aged 32)	Pollok	1986			
	Alex Burns	(Scotland)	FW	4 August 1973 (aged 23)	Youth team	1991			
	Willie Falconer	(Scotland)	FW	5 April 1966 (aged 31)	Celtic	1996			
	John Hendry	(Scotland)	FW	6 January 1970 (aged 27)	Tottenham Hotspur	1995			
Left during the season
	Jamie Dolan	(Scotland)	MF	22 February 1969 (aged 28)	Youth team	1987			
	Innes Ritchie	(Scotland)	DF	24 August 1973 (aged 23)	Youth team	1992			
	Andy Roddie	(Scotland)	MF	4 November 1971 (aged 25)	Aberdeen	1994			

== Transfers ==
=== In ===
Date	Position	Nationality	Name	From	Fee	Ref
16 November 1997	MF	(Finland)	Joni Lehtonen	Ilves	Undisclosed	
7 January 1998	FW	(Republic of Ireland)	Owen Coyle	Dundee United	Player swap	
7 February 1998	MF	(Finland)	Simo Valakari	FinnPa	Undisclosed	
14 March 1998	MF	(Scotland)	Mickey Weir	Hibernian	Undisclosed	
21 March 1998	DF	(Scotland)	Kevin Christie	East Fife	Undisclosed	

=== Loans in ===
Date from	Position	Nationality	Name	From	Date to	Ref.
24 July 2021	FW	(Scotland)	Matthew Connelly	Gretna	End of season	

=== Out ===
Date	Position	Nationality	Name	To	Fee	Ref.
7 January 1998	MF	(Scotland)	Jamie Dolan	Dundee United	Player swap	
11 January 1998	DF	(Scotland)	Innes Ritchie	East Fife	Undisclosed	
27 January 1998	MF	(Scotland)	Andy Roddie	Notts County	Undisclosed	

=== Released ===
Date	Position	Nationality	Name	Joined	Date	Ref.
30 June 1996	MF	(Scotland)	Paul Lambert	Borussia Dortmund		

== Friendlies ==
24 July 2021	Southend United	1 – 0	Motherwell	Southend-on-Sea
BST (UTC+1)	Goal			Stadium: Roots Hall

25 July 2021	Baldock Town	1 – 2	Motherwell	Arlesey
BST (UTC+1)	Goal		Goal	Stadium: Hitchin Road

27 July 2021	Blyth Spartans	2 – 3	Motherwell	Blyth
BST (UTC+1)	Goal		Goal	Stadium: Croft Park

3 August 2021	Motherwell	0 – 1	Porto	Motherwell
15:00 BST (UTC+1)			Goal	Stadium: Fir Park

== Competitions ==
=== Overview ===
Competition	First match	Last match	Starting round	Final position	Record							
Competition	First match	Last match	Starting round	Final position	Pld	W	D	L	GF	GA	GD	Win %
Premier Division	10 August 1996	10 May 1997	Matchday 1	8th	36	9	11	16	44	55	−11	25.00
Scottish Cup	25 January 1997	8 March 1997	Third Round	Quarterfinal	4	2	1	1	6	5	+1	50.00
League Cup	13 August 1996	13 August 1996	Second Round	Second Round	1	0	1	0	0	0	+0	0.00
Total					41	11	13	17	50	60	−10	26.83

Last updated: 10 May 1997
Source: Competitions

=== Premier Division ===
==== Results summary ====
Overall								Home						Away					
Pld	W	D	L	GF	GA	GD	Pts	W	D	L	GF	GA	GD	W	D	L	GF	GA	GD
36	9	11	16	44	55	−11	38	5	5	8	24	25	−1	4	6	8	20	30	−10

Source: Fir Park Corner

==== Results by round ====
Round	1	2	3	4	5	6	7	8	9	10	11	12	13	14	15	16	17	18	19	20	21	22	23	24	25	26	27	28	29	30	31	32	33	34	35	36
Ground	A	H	A	H	A	A	H	A	H	A	H	H	A	A	H	H	A	H	A	A	A	H	H	H	A	H	A	H	A	A	H	A	H	H	A	H
Result	D	D	W	L	D	D	W	L	D	L	L	L	W	L	W	L	D	L	L	L	L	W	L	W	L	D	W	L	D	L	L	D	W	D	W	D
Position	6	7	3	5	5	5	4	6	5	7	8	9	7	8	7	8	8	8	9	9	9	8	9	7	9	8	7	7	7	8	9	9	9	9	7	8

Source: Fir Park Corner
A = Away; H = Home; W = Win; D = Draw; L = Loss

==== Results ====
10 August 1996 1	Dundee United	1–1	Motherwell	Dundee
BST (UTC+1)	McSwegan 7'		van der Gaag 78'; May (yellow card); Denham (yellow card)	Stadium: Tannadice; Attendance: 8,157; Referee: Captain W Simpson

17 August 1996 2	Motherwell	2–2	Aberdeen	Motherwell
BST (UTC+1)	McSkimming 40' (pen.), 51'; McMillan (yellow card); Falconer (yellow card)		Windass 24' (yellow card); Shearer 72' (yellow card); Kiryakov (yellow card)	Stadium: Fir Park; Attendance: 5,036

24 August 1996 3	Raith Rovers	0–3	Motherwell	Kirkcaldy
BST (UTC+1)	Browne (yellow card); Millar (yellow card)		van der Gaag 23', 58'; Arnott 31'; Dolan (yellow card)	Stadium: Stark's Park; Attendance: 4,836

7 September 1996 4	Motherwell	0–1	Rangers	Motherwell
BST (UTC+1)	van der Gaag (yellow card); McSkimming (yellow card)		Gough 39'; Gascoigne (yellow card)	Stadium: Fir Park; Attendance: 12,288

14 September 1996 5	Dunfermline Athletic	1–1	Motherwell	Dunfermline
BST (UTC+1)	Clark 5'		May 57'	Stadium: East End Park; Attendance: 5,687

21 September 1996 6	Hearts	1–1	Motherwell	Edinburgh
BST (UTC+1)	Weir 5'		Arnott 46'; May (yellow card)	Stadium: Tynecastle; Attendance: 10,932

28 September 1996 7	Motherwell	1–0	Kilmarnock	Motherwell
BST (UTC+1)	Arnott 19'; Dolan (red card) 86'		Anderson (red card) 86'	Stadium: Fir Park; Attendance: 5,700

12 October 1996 8	Celtic	1–0	Motherwell	Glasgow
BST (UTC+1)	Marshall (yellow card) (yellow-red card) 80' van Hooijdonk 90'		May (yellow card); McSkimming (yellow card)	Stadium: Celtic Park; Attendance: 49,422

19 October 1996 9	Motherwell	1–1	Hibernian	Motherwell
BST (UTC+1)	McSkimming 73'; Dolan (yellow card); Burns (yellow card)		Leighton (yellow card) (yellow-red card) 26'; Harper 73' (yellow card); Wilkins (yellow card)	Stadium: Fir Park; Attendance: 6,784

26 October 1996 10	Rangers	5–0	Motherwell	Glasgow
BST (UTC+1)	Laudrup 51', 78'; Gascoigne 66', 79', 84' (yellow card)		Ross (yellow card); McCart (yellow card)	Stadium: Ibrox Stadium; Attendance: 48,160

2 November 1996 11	Motherwell	1–3	Dundee United	Motherwell
15:00 GMT (UTC)	Ross 59'		Olofsson 55'; McKinnon 57'; Winters 89'	Stadium: Fir Park; Attendance: 5,814

11 November 1996 12	Motherwell	0–2	Hearts	Motherwell
15:00 GMT (UTC)	May (yellow card); Martin (yellow card); Burns (yellow card)		Paille 54' (yellow card); Robertson 88'; Weir (yellow card)	Stadium: Fir Park; Attendance: 5,441

16 November 1996 13	Kilmarnock	2–4	Motherwell	Kilmarnock
15:00 GMT (UTC)	Wright 55', 87' (pen.)		Coyne 9', 59', 89'; Philliben 49'	Stadium: Rugby Park; Attendance: 7,087

30 November 1996 14	Hibernian	2–0	Motherwell	Edinburgh
15:00 GMT (UTC)	Jackson 35', 90' (pen.); Wilkins (yellow card)		Dolan (yellow card); Davies (yellow card)	Stadium: Easter Road; Attendance: 7,332

7 December 1996 15	Motherwell	2–1	Celtic	Motherwell
15:00 GMT (UTC)	Davies 39'; Ross 89'; Roddie (yellow card)		Hay 83' (yellow card); McKinlay (yellow card)	Stadium: Fir Park; Attendance: 11,589

11 December 1996 16	Motherwell	0–1	Raith Rovers	Motherwell
15:00 GMT (UTC)			Lennon 89'	Stadium: Fir Park; Attendance: 4,040

14 December 1996 17	Aberdeen	0–0	Motherwell	Aberdeen
15:00 GMT (UTC)	Shearer (yellow card)		Martin (yellow card); McMillan (yellow card); Dolan (yellow card); Roddie (yellow card); Burns (yellow card)	Stadium: Pittodrie Stadium; Attendance: 10,000

21 December 1996 18	Motherwell	2–3	Dunfermline Athletic	Motherwell
15:00 GMT (UTC)	Ireland 12' (o.g.); Coyne 29' van der Gaag (yellow card); Davies (yellow card)		Miller 15' (pen.) (yellow card); Andy Smith 56', 75'	Stadium: Fir Park; Attendance: 4,529

26 December 1996 19	Dundee United	2–0	Motherwell	Dundee
15:00 GMT (UTC)	McSwegan 36'; Hannah 67'		Martin (yellow card)	Stadium: Tannadice; Attendance: 8,072

28 December 1996 20	Hearts	4–1	Motherwell	Edinburgh
15:00 GMT (UTC)	Robertson 22' (pen.), 75'; Weir 53'; Hamilton 63'		Coyne 12'; Martin (yellow card); McSkimming (yellow card); Davies (yellow card); Falconer (yellow card)	Stadium: Tynecastle; Attendance: 11,164

4 January 1997 21	Celtic	5–0	Motherwell	Glasgow
15:00 GMT (UTC)	Di Canio 29' (pen.) van Hooijdonk 41'; Cadete 75', 86'; Wieghorst 87'; Mackay (yellow card); McNamara (yellow card)		McCart (yellow card); Denham (yellow card)	Stadium: Celtic Park; Attendance: 45,374

11 January 1997 22	Motherwell	2–1	Hibernian	Motherwell
15:00 GMT (UTC)	McSkimming 20'; Hunter 24' (o.g.) van der Gaag (yellow card)		Dow 49'; Welsh (yellow card)	Stadium: Fir Park; Attendance: 5,855

18 January 1997 23	Motherwell	1–3	Rangers	Motherwell
15:00 GMT (UTC)	Coyle 68' (pen.) (yellow card) van der Gaag (yellow card); McSkimming (yellow card); Ross (yellow card); Falconer (yellow card)		Albertz 20'; Laudrup 60' (yellow card); Gascoigne 88'	Stadium: Fir Park; Attendance: 13,166

21 January 1997 24	Motherwell	2–0	Kilmarnock	Motherwell
15:00 GMT (UTC)	Coyle 3', 38' van der Gaag (yellow card)		Mitchell (yellow card); Reilly (yellow card)	Stadium: Fir Park; Attendance: 5,508

1 February 1997 25	Dunfermline Athletic	3–1	Motherwell	Dunfermline
15:00 GMT (UTC)	Miller 11'; Tod 26'; Britton 76'		Davies (yellow card)	Stadium: East End Park; Attendance: 4,796

8 February 1997 26	Motherwell	2–2	Aberdeen	Motherwell
15:00 GMT (UTC)	Falconer 48' (yellow card); Burns 54' (yellow card); Philliben (yellow card) (yellow-red card) 82'; May (yellow card)		Dodds 11'; Martin 33' (o.g.); Windass (yellow card) (yellow-red card) 82'; Glass (yellow card)	Stadium: Fir Park; Attendance: 5,555

18 February 1997 27	Raith Rovers	1–5	Motherwell	Kirkcaldy
15:00 GMT (UTC)	Duffield 79'		Coyle 27' van der Gaag 40'; Coyne 48', 54'; May 81' (yellow card); Valakari (yellow card)	Stadium: Stark's Park; Attendance: 3,052

22 February 1997 28	Motherwell	0–1	Celtic	Motherwell
15:00 GMT (UTC)	McMillan (yellow card)		Cadete 10'	Stadium: Fir Park; Attendance: 12,131; Referee: Jim McCluskey

1 March 1997 29	Hibernian	1–1	Motherwell	Edinburgh
15:00 GMT (UTC)	Wright 51'		Coyne 64'; Falconer (yellow card)	Stadium: Easter Road; Attendance: 8,328

15 March 1997 30	Kilmarnock	1–0	Motherwell	Kilmarnock
15:00 GMT (UTC)	Wright 77'; MacPherson (yellow card)		Martin (yellow card); Wishart (yellow card)	Stadium: Rugby Park; Attendance: 7,612

22 March 1997 31	Motherwell	0–1	Hearts	Motherwell
15:00 GMT (UTC)	Martin (yellow card); Davies (yellow card)		Paille 12'	Stadium: Fir Park; Attendance: 6,245

5 April 1997 32	Aberdeen	0–0	Motherwell	Aberdeen
BST (UTC+1)			Valakari (yellow card); Davies (yellow card); Coyle (yellow card)	Stadium: Pittodrie Stadium; Attendance: 9,000; Referee: Captain W Simpson

12 April 1997 33	Motherwell	5–0	Raith Rovers	Motherwell
BST (UTC+1)	Falconer 17'; Weir 46'; Coyne 53', 74'; Coyle 78'		Harvey (yellow card)	Stadium: Fir Park; Attendance: 4,691

19 April 1997 34	Motherwell	1–1	Dundee United	Motherwell
BST (UTC+1)	Coyne 36' (pen.); Christie (yellow card) (yellow-red card) 88'; Weir (yellow card)		McKimmie (yellow card) (yellow-red card) 40'; Zetterlund 66'; Bowman (yellow card)	Stadium: Fir Park; Attendance: 5,382

5 May 1997 35	Rangers	0–2	Motherwell	Glasgow
BST (UTC+1)	McLaren (yellow card); Gascoigne (yellow card)		Coyle 7' (pen.), 84'; Valakari (yellow card); Weir (yellow card)	Stadium: Ibrox Stadium; Attendance: 50,059

10 May 1997 36	Motherwell	2–2	Dunfermline Athletic	Motherwell
BST (UTC+1)	Weir 32' van der Gaag 73'		French 38'; Bingham 59'; Fraser (yellow card); Britton (yellow card)	Stadium: Fir Park; Attendance: 9,676

==== League table ====
Pos	Team	Pld	W	D	L	GF	GA	GD	Pts	Qualification or relegation
6	Aberdeen	36	10	14	12	45	54	−9	44	
7	Kilmarnock	36	11	6	19	41	61	−20	39	Qualification for the Cup Winners' Cup qualifying round (Note: Kilmarnock qualified for the Cup Winners' Cup as the winners of the Scottish Cup.)
8	Motherwell	36	9	11	16	44	55	−11	38	
9	Hibernian (O)	36	9	11	16	38	55	−17	38	Qualification for the Play-off
10	Raith Rovers (R)	36	6	7	23	29	73	−44	25	Relegation to the First Division

Source: Soccerbase
Rules for classification: 1) Points; 2) Goal difference; 3) Goals scored
(O) Play-off winners; (R) Relegated

=== Scottish Cup ===
25 January 1997 Third round	Partick Thistle	0–2	Motherwell	Glasgow
			McSkimming 65'; Davies 76'	Stadium: Firhill

15 February 1997 Fourth Round	Motherwell	1–1	Hamilton Academical	Motherwell
	Coyle 33'		Clark 69'	Stadium: Fir Park; Attendance: 8,050

26 February 1997 Fourth Round Replay	Hamilton Academical	0–2	Motherwell	Glasgow
		[ Report]	Coyle 1', 77'	Stadium: Firhill

8 March 1997 Quarter-finals	Dundee United	4–1	Motherwell	Dundee
	McLaren 47', 66'; Winters 63'; Olofsson 87'	[ Report]	Van der Gaag 80'	Stadium: Tannadice; Attendance: 11,054

=== League Cup ===
13 August 1996 Second round	Motherwell	0–0 (a.e.t.) (2 – 4 p)	Alloa Athletic	Motherwell
				Stadium: Fir Park

== Statistics ==
=== Goal scorers ===
Ranking	Position	Nation	Number	Name	Premier Division	Scottish Cup	League Cup	Total
1	FW	(Republic of Ireland)		Tommy Coyne	11	0	0	11
2	FW	(Republic of Ireland)		Owen Coyle	7	3	0	10
3	DF	(Netherlands)		Mitchell van der Gaag	6	1	0	7
4	MF	(Scotland)		Shaun McSkimming	4	1	0	5
5	FW	(Scotland)		Dougie Arnott	3	0	0	3
6	FW	(Scotland)		Willie Falconer	2	0	0	2
6	MF	(Scotland)		Eddie May	2	0	0	2
6	MF	(Scotland)		Ian Ross	2	0	0	2
6	MF	(Scotland)		Mickey Weir	2	0	0	2
6	MF	(Scotland)		Billy Davies	1	1	0	2
6				Own goal	2	0	0	2
12	FW	(Scotland)		Alex Burns	1	0	0	1
12	DF	(Scotland)		John Philliben	1	0	0	1
TOTALS					44	6	0	50

== See also ==
- List of Motherwell F.C. seasons
