= 1997–98 Motherwell F.C. season =

Motherwell
1997–98 season
- Chairman: John Boyle
- Manager: Alex McLeish (until 10 February); Harri Kampman (from 11 February)
- Premier Division: 9th
- Scottish Cup: Quarter-finals
- League Cup: Fourth round
- Top goalscorer: League: Tommy Coyne (14); All: Owen Coyle (16)

The 1997–98 season was Motherwell's 13th consecutive season in the Scottish Premier Division, and their final season before the top division of Scottish Football was reformed as the Scottish Premier League.

== Squad ==
As of match played 9 May 1998

No.	Name	Nationality	Position	Date of birth (age)	Signed from	Signed in	Contract ends	Apps.	Goals
Goalkeepers
	Scott Thomson	(Scotland)	GK	8 November 1966 (aged 31)	loan from Hull City	1998	1998	1	0
	Stevie Woods	(Scotland)	GK	23 February 1970 (aged 28)	Preston North End	1994			
Defenders
	Stephen Craigan	(Northern Ireland)	DF	29 October 1976 (aged 21)	Blantyre Victoria	1995			
	Kevin Christie	(Scotland)	DF	1 April 1976 (aged 22)	East Fife	1997			
	Greig Denham	(Scotland)	DF	5 October 1976 (aged 21)	Youth team	1994			
	Brian Martin	(Scotland)	DF	24 February 1963 (aged 35)	St Mirren	1991			
	Eddie May	(Scotland)	DF	30 August 1967 (aged 30)	Falkirk	1994			
	Steve McMillan	(Scotland)	DF	19 January 1976 (aged 22)	Troon	1993			
	John Philliben	(Scotland)	DF	14 March 1964 (aged 34)	Doncaster Rovers	1986			
Midfielders
	Simo Valakari	(Finland)	MF	28 April 1973 (aged 25)	FinnPa	1996			
	Éric Garcin	(France)	MF	6 December 1965 (aged 32)	Toulouse	1997		13	1
	Billy Davies	(Scotland)	MF	31 May 1964 (aged 33)	Dunfermline Athletic	1993			
	Lee McCulloch	(Scotland)	MF	14 May 1978 (aged 19)	Youth team	1994		51	2
	Shaun McSkimming	(Scotland)	MF	29 May 1970 (aged 27)	Kilmarnock	1994			
	Ian Ross	(Scotland)	MF	27 August 1974 (aged 23)	Youth team	1995			
	Mickey Weir	(Scotland)	MF	16 January 1966 (aged 32)	Hibernian	1996			
	Stefan Lindqvist	(Sweden)	MF	18 March 1967 (aged 31)	Dalian Shide	1997		6	1
Forwards
	Owen Coyle	(Republic of Ireland)	FW	14 July 1966 (aged 31)	Dundee United	1997			
	Tommy Coyne	(Republic of Ireland)	FW	14 November 1962 (aged 35)	Tranmere Rovers	1993			
	Eliphas Shivute	(Namibia)	FW	27 September 1974 (aged 23)	Alemannia Aachen	1997		24	3
	Dougie Arnott	(Scotland)	FW	5 August 1964 (aged 33)	Pollok	1986			
	Willie Falconer	(Scotland)	FW	5 April 1966 (aged 32)	Celtic	1996			
	John Hendry	(Scotland)	FW	6 January 1970 (aged 28)	Tottenham Hotspur	1995			
	Mats Lundgren	(Sweden)	FW	19 April 1970 (aged 28)	Unattached	1997		0	0
Left during the season
	Scott Howie	(Scotland)	GK	4 January 1972 (aged 26)	Norwich City	1994			
	Franz Resch	(Austria)	DF	4 May 1969 (aged 29)	Admira Wacker	1997		5	0
	Rob Newman	(England)	DF	13 December 1963 (aged 34)	loan from Norwich City	1997	1998	15	0
	Marko Tuomela	(Finland)	DF	3 March 1972 (aged 26)	FF Jaro	1997		0	0
	Gunnlaugur Jónsson	(Iceland)	DF	29 November 1974 (aged 23)	ÍA	1997		2	0
	Mario Dorner	(Austria)	FW	21 March 1970 (aged 28)	Admira Wacker	1997		4	0

== Transfers ==
=== In ===
Date	Position	Nationality	Name	From	Fee	Ref.
28 July 1997	MF	(Austria)	Franz Resch	Admira Wacker	Undisclosed	
28 July 1997	FW	(Austria)	Mario Dorner	Admira Wacker	Undisclosed	
10 September 1997	FW	(Namibia)	Eliphas Shivute	Alemannia Aachen	Undisclosed	
24 October 1997	DF	(Iceland)	Gunnlaugur Jónsson	ÍA	Free	
31 October 1997	MF	(France)	Éric Garcin	Toulouse	Undisclosed	
14 November 1997	DF	(Finland)	Marko Tuomela	FF Jaro	Undisclosed	
27 March 1998	MF	(Sweden)	Stefan Lindqvist	Dalian Wanda	Undisclosed	
31 March 1998	FW	(Sweden)	Mats Lundgren		Undisclosed	

=== Loans in ===
Date from	Position	Nationality	Name	From	Date to	Ref.
12 December 1997	DF	(England)	Rob Newman	Norwich City	8 March 1998	
27 March 1998	GK	(Scotland)	Scott Thomson	Hull City	End of season	

=== Out ===
Date	Position	Nationality	Name	To	Fee	Ref.
17 October 1997	MF	(Austria)	Franz Resch	Darlington	Undisclosed	
17 October 1997	FW	(Austria)	Mario Dorner	Darlington	Undisclosed	
March 1998	GK	(Scotland)	Scott Howie	Reading	Undisclosed	

=== Loans out ===
Date from	Position	Nationality	Name	From	Date to	Ref.
January 1998	GK	(Scotland)	Scott Howie	Coventry City	March 1998	

=== Released ===
Date	Position	Nationality	Name	Joined	Date
2 November 1997	DF	(Iceland)	Gunnlaugur Jónsson	Kongsvinger	
14 December 1997	DF	(Finland)	Marko Tuomela	Tromsø	
30 June 1998	MF	(Scotland)	Mickey Weir	Retirement	

== Competitions ==
=== Overview ===
Competition	First match	Last match	Starting round	Final position	Record							
Competition	First match	Last match	Starting round	Final position	Pld	W	D	L	GF	GA	GD	Win %
Premier Division	2 August 1997	9 May 1998	Matchday 1	9th	36	9	7	20	46	64	−18	25.00
Scottish Cup	24 January 1998	17 February 1998	Third Round	Fourth Round	4	1	2	1	4	6	−2	25.00
League Cup	9 August 1997	10 September 1997	Second Round	Quarterfinal	3	1	1	1	5	3	+2	33.33
Total					43	11	10	22	55	73	−18	25.58

Last updated: 9 May 1998
Source: Competitions

=== Premier Division ===
==== Results summary ====
Overall								Home						Away					
Pld	W	D	L	GF	GA	GD	Pts	W	D	L	GF	GA	GD	W	D	L	GF	GA	GD
36	9	7	20	46	64	−18	34	6	4	8	26	28	−2	3	3	12	20	36	−16

Source: Fir Park Corner

==== Results by round ====
Round	1	2	3	4	5	6	7	8	9	10	11	12	13	14	15	16	17	18	19	20	21	22	23	24	25	26	27	28	29	30	31	32	33	34	35	36
Ground	A	A	H	H	H	A	H	A	A	H	A	H	A	H	A	A	H	H	A	A	A	H	H	A	H	H	A	H	A	H	A	H	A	H	A	H
Result	W	L	W	L	D	D	L	L	L	L	L	L	W	D	D	L	W	W	L	L	D	L	W	L	L	W	L	W	L	W	D	D	L	L	L	L
Position	1	5	3	5	5	6	7	7	7	10	10	10	9	9	9	9	8	8	8	8	8	8	8	9	9	8	9	9	9	7	7	7	7	9	9	9

Source: Fir Park Corner
A = Away; H = Home; W = Win; D = Draw; L = Loss

==== Results ====
2 August 1997 1	Dunfermline Athletic	0–2	Motherwell	East End Park
			Coyne 63', pen.', 85'	Attendance: 5,746

16 August 1997 2	Motherwell	0–1	St Johnstone	Fir Park
			Grant 65'	Attendance: 5,036

23 August 1997 3	Aberdeen	1–3	Motherwell	Pittodrie
	Rowson 26'		Weir 9', 55'; Coyne 29'	Attendance: 11,522

13 September 1997 4	Motherwell	2–3	Celtic	Fir Park
	Coyne 4', 59'; Denham (yellow card) 62' (yellow-red card)		Burley 57', 75'; Donnelly 81'	Attendance: 11,550

20 September 1997 5	Motherwell	1–1	Hibernian	Fir Park
	Coyne 80'		Rougier 46'	Attendance: 7,420

27 September 1997 6	Rangers	2–2	Motherwell	Ibrox
	Negri 17'; Porrini 63'		Coyne 7'; Shivute 44'	Attendance: 48,672

4 October 1997 7	Motherwell	1–4	Hearts	Fir Park
	Coyne 44' (pen.)		Cameron 6'; Adam 13'; McCann 20'; Hamilton 71'	Attendance: 8,886; Referee: Jim McCluskey

8 October 1997 8	Kilmarnock	2–1	Motherwell	Rugby Park
	Vareille 17'; Burke 37'		Shivute 44'	Attendance: 6,588

18 October 1997 9	Dundee United	4–0	Motherwell	Tannadice Stadium
	Olofsson 2'; Winters 14'; McSwegan 77'; Andy McLaren 87'			Attendance: 7,337

25 October 1997 10	Motherwell	1–2	Aberdeen	Fir Park
	Davies 62'		Windass 8', 89'	Attendance: 6,065

1 November 1997 11	St Johnstone	4–3	Motherwell	McDiarmid Park
	Kernaghan 18'; O'Neil 33', 60'; Grant 49' (pen.)		Hendry 61' (pen.); Davies 66'; Coyle 72'	Attendance: 4,566

8 November 1997 12	Motherwell	0–1	Kilmarnock	Fir Park
			Roberts 67' (pen.)	Attendance: 5,346

15 November 1997 13	Celtic	0–2	Motherwell	Celtic Park
	Blinker (red card) 34'		Coyle 28'; Weir 90'	Attendance: 48,010

22 November 1997 14	Motherwell	1–1	Rangers	Fir Park
	Coyne 80'		McCoist 20'	Attendance: 12,018

15 November 1997 15	Hibernian	1–1	Motherwell	Easter Road
	Dods 75'		Coyle 90'	Attendance: 9,999

6 December 1997 16	Hearts	2–0	Motherwell	Tynecastle
	Cameron 45' (pen.); Flogel 68'		Christie (yellow card) 45' (yellow-red card)	Attendance: 12,706

13 December 1997 17	Motherwell	1–0	Dundee United	Fir Park
	Coyle 52'			Attendance: 4,555

20 December 1997 18	Motherwell	2–0	Dunfermline Athletic	Fir Park
	Coyle 61', 69'			Attendance: 4,607

27 December 1997 19	Aberdeen	3–0	Motherwell	Pittodrie
	Windass 63'; Jess 83', pen.', 86'			Attendance: 13,038

3 January 1998 20	Kilmarnock	4–1	Motherwell	Rugby Park
	Wright 8', 33'; Mitchell 44'; McPherson (yellow card) 75' (yellow-red card); Roberts 88'		Coyle 24'	Attendance: 8,724

10 January 1998 21	Motherwell	1–1	Celtic	Fir Park
	Falconer 55'		Lambert 61'	Attendance: 12,350

17 January 1998 22	Rangers	1–0	Motherwell	Ibrox
	Cleland 23'			Attendance: 49,443

31 January 1998 23	Motherwell	6–2	Hibernian	Fir Park
	Arnott 10'; Weir 23'; Garcin 43'; McCulloch 43'; Coyne 88'		Crawford 4'; Lavety 8'; Welsh (yellow card) 43' (yellow-red card)	Attendance: 6,169

7 February 1998 24	Dundee United	1–0	Motherwell	Tannadice
	Olofsson 68'			Attendance: 6,532

21 February 1998 25	Motherwell	2–4	Hearts	Fir Park
	Coyle 6'; Falconer 37'		Hamilton 38' (58); Fulton 64'; Adam 87'	Attendance: 8,375

25 February 1998 26	Motherwell	2–1	St Johnstone	Fir Park
	Coyne 11', 19'		O'Boyle 61' (pen.); Kernaghan (yellow card) 89' (yellow-red card)	Attendance: 4,517

7 March 1998 27	Dunfermline Athletic	2–1	Motherwell	East End Park
	Smith 23', 61'		Coyne 12'	Attendance: 4,811

14 March 1998 28	Motherwell	2–1	Rangers	Fir Park
	Coyle 44'; Falconer 87'		McCoist 12'	Attendance: 11,779

21 March 1998 29	Hibernian	1–0	Motherwell	Easter Road
	Elliot (red card) 20'; Lavety 34'			Attendance: 10,582

28 March 1998 30	Motherwell	1–0	Dundee United	Fir Park
	Coyle 52'			Attendance: 5,012

8 April 1998 31	Hearts	1–1	Motherwell	Tynecastle
	McCann 59'		Coyne 79'	Attendance: 14,737

11 April 1998 32	Motherwell	1–1	Kilmarnock	Fir Park
	Lindqvist 80'		Holt 28'	Attendance: 6,209; Referee: Jim McCluskey

18 April 1998 33	Celtic	4–1	Motherwell	Celtic Park
	Burley 25', 43'; Simon Donnelly 49', 62'		McMillan 12'	Attendance: 49,541

25 April 1998 34	Motherwell	1–3	Dunfermline Athletic	Fir Park
	Shivute 28'		Smith 28'; Ireland 31'; Britton 54'	Attendance: 5,745

2 May 1998 35	St Johnstone	3–2	Motherwell	Celtic Park
	Jenkinson 15', 88'; McCluskey 70'		Martin 4'; Coyle 58' (pen.)	Attendance: 49,541

9 May 1998 36	Motherwell	1–2	Aberdeen	Fir Park
	Ross 67'		Dodds 2', pen.', 22'	Attendance: 5,861

==== League table ====
Pos	Team	Pld	W	D	L	GF	GA	GD	Pts	Qualification or relegation
6	Aberdeen	36	9	12	15	39	53	−14	39	
7	Dundee United	36	8	13	15	43	51	−8	37	
8	Dunfermline Athletic	36	8	13	15	43	68	−25	37	
9	Motherwell	36	9	7	20	46	64	−18	34	
10	Hibernian (R)	36	6	12	18	38	59	−21	30	Relegation to the First Division

Source: Rec.Sport.Soccer Statistics Foundation
Rules for classification: 1) Points; 2) Goal difference; 3) Goals scored
(R) Relegated

=== Scottish Cup ===
24 January 1998 Third Round	Dumbarton	1–1	Motherwell	Dumbarton
	Sharp 76' (pen.)		McSkimming 47'	Stadium: Boghead Park; Attendance: 2,412

27 January 1998 Third Round Replay	Motherwell	1–0	Dumbarton	Motherwell
	Coyle 73'			Stadium: Fir Park; Attendance: 4,204

14 February 1998 Fourth Round	Motherwell	2–2	Rangers	Motherwell
	Coyne 19'; Gough 77' (o.g.)	[ Report]	Negri 26'; Durie 83'	Stadium: Fir Park; Attendance: 12,602

17 February 1998 Fourth Round Replay	Rangers	3–0	Motherwell	Glasgow
	Albertz 36', 86'; Durie 38'	[ Report]		Stadium: Ibrox; Attendance: 42,043

=== League Cup ===
9 August 1997 Second Round	Motherwell	2–2 (4–1 p)	Inverness CT	Motherwell
BST (UTC+1)	Falconer 16'; Coyle 22' (yellow card); Martin (red card) 103'; Davies (red card) 104'; Coyne (yellow card); Valakari (yellow card); Ross (yellow card)		Thomson 55' (pen.); Addicoat 87' (yellow card); Hastings (yellow card); I.MacArthur (yellow card); Wilson (yellow card); Stewart (yellow card); Andersen (yellow card)	Stadium: Fir Park; Attendance: 4,247

20 August 1997 Third Round	Motherwell	3–0	Greenock Morton	Motherwell
BST (UTC+1)	Coyle 9', 39', 62'; Christie (yellow card); May (yellow card); McMillan (yellow card); Falconer (yellow card)		Anderson (red card) 63'; Mahood (yellow card)	Stadium: Fir Park; Attendance: 4,576

10 September 1997 Quarter-final	Celtic	1–0	Motherwell	Glasgow
BST (UTC+1)	Larsson 29'		Ross (yellow card) (yellow-red card) 90'; Christie (yellow card); Coyle (yellow card); Weir (yellow card)	Stadium: Celtic Park; Attendance: 37,006

== Squad statistics ==
As of match played 9 May 1998

=== Appearances ===
No.	Pos	Nat	Player	Total		Premier Division		Scottish Cup		League Cup	
No.	Pos	Nat	Player	Apps	Goals	Apps	Goals	Apps	Goals	Apps	Goals
	GK	(Scotland) SCO	Scott Thomson	1	0	1	0	0	0	0	0
	GK	(Scotland) SCO	Stevie Woods	42	0	35	0	4	0	3	0
	DF	(Northern Ireland) NIR	Stephen Craigan	14	0	9+5	0	0	0	0	0
	DF	(Scotland) SCO	Kevin Christie	25	0	20+1	0	2	0	2	0
	DF	(Scotland) SCO	Greig Denham	21	0	18	0	0	0	3	0
	DF	(Scotland) SCO	Brian Martin	33	1	26	1	4	0	3	0
	DF	(Scotland) SCO	Eddie May	32	0	20+5	0	4	0	3	0
	DF	(Scotland) SCO	Stephen McMillan	41	1	33+1	1	4	0	3	0
	DF	(Scotland) SCO	John Philliben	15	0	10+3	0	0+2	0	0	0
	MF	(Finland) FIN	Simo Valakari	31	0	24+3	0	0+2	0	1+1	0
	MF	(France) FRA	Éric Garcin	13	1	7+4	1	2	0	0	0
	MF	(Scotland) SCO	Billy Davies	19	2	12+5	2	0+1	0	1	0
	MF	(Scotland) SCO	Lee McCulloch	30	2	6+18	2	2+2	0	0+2	0
	MF	(Scotland) SCO	Shaun McSkimming	15	1	11+1	0	3	1	0	0
	MF	(Scotland) SCO	Ian Ross	25	1	16+6	1	0	0	0+3	0
	MF	(Scotland) SCO	Mickey Weir	23	4	13+5	4	2	0	3	0
	MF	(Sweden) SWE	Stefan Lindqvist	6	1	5+1	1	0	0	0	0
	FW	(Republic of Ireland) IRL	Owen Coyle	43	16	34+2	11	4	1	3	4
	FW	(Republic of Ireland) IRL	Tommy Coyne	41	15	33+1	14	4	1	3	0
	FW	(Namibia) NAM	Eliphas Shivute	24	3	12+11	3	0	0	0+1	0
	FW	(Scotland) SCO	Dougie Arnott	10	1	3+4	1	1+2	0	0	0
	FW	(Scotland) SCO	Willie Falconer	29	4	21+1	3	4	0	3	1
	FW	(Scotland) SCO	John Hendry	13	1	10+3	1	0	0	0	0
Players who appeared for Motherwell but left during the season:
	DF	(Austria) AUT	Franz Resch	5	0	3	0	0	0	2	0
	DF	(England) ENG	Rob Newman	15	0	11	0	4	0	0	0
	DF	(Iceland) ISL	Gunnlaugur Jónsson	2	0	2	0	0	0	0	0
	FW	(Austria) AUT	Mario Dorner	4	0	1+1	0	0	0	0+2	0

=== Goal scorers ===
Ranking	Position	Nation	Number	Name	Premier Division	Scottish Cup	League Cup	Total
1	FW	(Republic of Ireland)		Owen Coyle	11	1	4	16
2	FW	(Republic of Ireland)		Tommy Coyne	14	1	0	15
3	MF	(Scotland)		Mickey Weir	4	0	0	4
3	FW	(Scotland)		Willie Falconer	3	0	1	4
5	FW	(Namibia)		Eliphas Shivute	3	0	0	3
6	MF	(Scotland)		Billy Davies	2	0	0	2
6	MF	(Scotland)		Lee McCulloch	2	0	0	2
8	DF	(Scotland)		Brian Martin	1	0	0	1
8	DF	(Scotland)		Steve McMillan	1	0	0	1
8	MF	(Sweden)		Stefan Lindqvist	1	0	0	1
8	MF	(Scotland)		Ian Ross	1	0	0	1
8	FW	(Scotland)		Dougie Arnott	1	0	0	1
8	DF	(France)		Éric Garcin	1	0	0	1
8	FW	(Scotland)		John Hendry	1	0	0	1
8	MF	(Scotland)		Shaun McSkimming	0	1	0	1
8				Own goal	0	1	0	1
TOTALS					46	4	5	55

=== Clean sheets ===
Ranking	Position	Nation	Number	Name	Premier Division	Scottish Cup	League Cup	Total
1	GK	(Scotland)		Stevie Woods	5	1	1	7
TOTALS					5	1	1	7

=== Disciplinary record ===
Number	Nation	Position	Name	Premier Division		Scottish Cup		League Cup		Total	
Number	Nation	Position	Name	Booked	Sent off (straight red)	Booked	Sent off (straight red)	Booked	Sent off (straight red)	Booked	Sent off (straight red)
	(Northern Ireland)	DF	Stephen Craigan	4	0	0	0	0	0	4	0
	(Scotland)	DF	Kevin Christie	4	1	2	0	2	0	8	1
	(Scotland)	DF	Greig Denham	6	1	0	0	0	0	6	1
	(Scotland)	DF	Brian Martin	7	0	0	0	0	1	8	1
	(Scotland)	DF	Eddie May	3	0	0	0	1	0	4	0
	(Scotland)	DF	Steve McMillan	8	0	0	0	1	0	9	0
	(Scotland)	DF	John Philliben	3	0	0	0	0	0	3	0
	(Finland)	MF	Simo Valakari	7	0	0	0	1	0	8	0
	(France)	MF	Éric Garcin	1	0	1	0	0	0	2	0
	(Scotland)	MF	Billy Davies	1	0	0	0	0	1	1	1
	(Scotland)	MF	Lee McCulloch	3	0	1	0	0	0	4	0
	(Scotland)	MF	Shaun McSkimming	3	0	0	0	0	0	3	0
	(Scotland)	MF	Ian Ross	5	0	0	0	2	1	7	1
	(Scotland)	MF	Mickey Weir	0	0	0	0	1	0	1	0
	(Republic of Ireland)	FW	Owen Coyle	3	0	0	0	2	0	5	0
	(Republic of Ireland)	FW	Tommy Coyne	3	0	0	0	1	0	4	0
	(Namibia)	FW	Eliphas Shivute	1	0	0	0	0	0	1	0
	(Scotland)	FW	Willie Falconer	6	0	0	0	1	0	7	0
	(Scotland)	FW	John Hendry	1	0	0	0	0	0	1	0
Players away on loan:
Players who left Motherwell during the season:
	(Austria)	DF	Franz Resch	1	0	0	0	0	0	1	0
	(England)	DF	Rob Newman	4	0	0	0	0	0	4	0
	(Iceland)	DF	Gunnlaugur Jónsson	1	0	0	0	0	0	1	0
			TOTALS	75	2	4	0	12	3	91	5

== See also ==
- List of Motherwell F.C. seasons
