= Jamie Dolan =

Scottish footballer (1969–2008)

Personal information
- Date of birth: 22 February 1969
- Place of birth: Salsburgh, Scotland
- Date of death: 31 August 2008 (aged 39)
- Position: Midfielder

Senior career*
Years	Team	Apps	(Gls)
1987–1997	Motherwell	193	(5)
1997–1999	Dundee United	45	(0)
1999–2000	Dunfermline Athletic	29	(0)
2000–2001	Livingston	8	(0)
2001	→ Forfar Athletic (loan)	5	(0)
2001–2002	Partick Thistle	26	(2)
Total		306	(7)

Managerial career
- 2004–2008: Broxburn Athletic
- * Club domestic league appearances and goals

James Dolan (22 February 1969 – 31 August 2008) was a Scottish professional footballer, who played for Motherwell, Dundee United, Dunfermline Athletic, Livingston, Forfar Athletic and Partick Thistle.

After he retired from the senior game, he spent four years as player-manager of Scottish Junior Football Eastern Region South Division side Broxburn Athletic, and also played for Bathgate Thistle in the Scottish Junior Football East Super League.

== Career ==
Dolan began his career with Motherwell in the late 1980s and was at Fir Park for ten years before transferring to Dundee United during the 1996–97 season. In 1997 Dolan reached the League Cup final with United, although he was as unused substitute despite featuring in each of the previous rounds. After two years at Tannadice, Dolan moved to Dunfermline, where he stayed for one season. A year at Livingston followed, which included a loan deal with Forfar Athletic and he spent his final playing season with Partick Thistle, retiring in 2002 after over 300 league games.

Jamie started his career at Motherwell in the late mid eighties after being signed from Forgewood Boys Club. He appeared in the Youth Cup Final at under-18s level against Celtic in the 1986–87 season – hitting the bar with a header at 0–0 in a game 'Well went on to lose 2–1.

However, the youth ranks could not contain the tenacious and brave midfield dynamo and he soon found himself promoted to the senior squad under Tommy McLean. He was a mainstay in the heart of the Motherwell midfield in the early to mid-nineties and formed part of a famous trio containing Paul Lambert and Billy Davies in 'Well's fantastic team of 1994–1996. In one game on 7 December 1996, having started in his usual midfield role, he even played in goal for the last 30 minutes against Celtic when Motherwell goalkeeper Scott Howie was taken off injured. Although Celtic scored one goal past Dolan – more the result of a short passback than a goalkeeping error – Motherwell's Ian Ross scored in the last minute of the game to secure a heroic 2–1 victory.

In January 1997, Motherwell were desperate for a striker to score goals and keep them in the league. Alex McLeish turned to Owen Coyle of Dundee United but the only way United would let the striker go was if Dolan headed to Tannadice as part of a swap-deal. The move was agreed, and after more than two hundred games in claret and amber, Jamie headed to the east coast.

After two seasons in tangerine, Dolan moved south to Fife to play for Dunfermline Athletic where he stayed for a year. A year at Livingston followed, which included a loan deal with Forfar Athletic. He spent his final playing season with Partick Thistle, retiring in 2002 after over 300 league games.

Jamie remained active in the game and was involved in the Junior Leagues for many years. He also retained strong links with Motherwell Football Club, playing an active role in the former players club, and assisting the club with charity and sponsors events.

Jamie played for the Motherwell Masters team and was a pivotal member of the squad that took the 2007 title, scoring the last goal in the final against Celtic.

== Death ==
Jamie died from a heart attack on 31 August 2008, whilst out jogging near his home in Bathgate, West Lothian. A post mortem revealed he suffered from cardiac ischaemia, a hereditary condition from which his father had also died, aged 44. Jamie had been due to play for a Motherwell Select team on 11 September 2008, in a testimonial match for former team-mate Dougie Arnott. His sudden death came just eight months after that of his former Motherwell teammate Phil O'Donnell, who died from a similar condition shortly after collapsing during a Scottish Premier League game for Motherwell.

== Career statistics ==
Club performance			League		Cup		League Cup		Continental		Total	
Season	Club	League	Apps	Goals	Apps	Goals	Apps	Goals	Apps	Goals	Apps	Goals
Scotland			League		Scottish Cup		League Cup		Europe		Total	
1987–88	Motherwell	Scottish Premier Division	177	5	N/A		N/A		8		N/A	
1988–89	Motherwell	Scottish Premier Division	177	5	N/A		N/A		8		N/A	
1989–90	Motherwell	Scottish Premier Division	177	5	N/A		N/A		8		N/A	
1990–91	Motherwell	Scottish Premier Division	177	5	N/A		N/A		8		N/A	
1991–92	Motherwell	Scottish Premier Division	177	5	N/A		N/A		8		N/A	
1992–93	Motherwell	Scottish Premier Division	177	5	N/A		N/A		8		N/A	
1993–94	Motherwell	Scottish Premier Division	177	5	N/A		N/A		8		N/A	
1994–95	Motherwell	Scottish Premier Division	177	5	N/A		N/A		8		N/A	
1995–96	Motherwell	Scottish Premier Division	177	5	N/A		N/A		8		N/A	
1996–97	Motherwell	Scottish Premier Division	17	0	-		-		-		17	0
1996–97	Dundee United	Scottish Premier Division	13	0	4	0	-		-		17	0
1997–98	Dundee United	Scottish Premier Division	26	0	3	0	3	0	-		32	0
1998–99	Dundee United	Scottish Premier League	5	0	1	0	2	0	-		8	0
1998–99	Dunfermline Athletic	Scottish Premier League	10	0	-		-		-		10	0
1999–00	Dunfermline Athletic	Scottish First Division	19	0	1	0	2	0	-		22	0
2000–01	Livingston	Scottish First Division	8	0	-		1	0	-		9	0
2000–01	Forfar Athletic (loan)	Scottish Second Division	5	0	-		-		-		5	0
2001–02	Partick Thistle	Scottish First Division	26	2	4	0	2	0	-		32	2
