= Rob McKinnon =

Scottish footballer

Personal information
- Full name: Robert McKinnon
- Date of birth: 31 July 1966 (age 60)
- Place of birth: Glasgow, Scotland
- Height: 5 ft 11 in (1.80 m)
- Position: Left back

Youth career
- EKYC
- 1983–1984: Rutherglen Glencairn
- 1984–1985: Newcastle United

Senior career*
Years	Team	Apps	(Gls)
1985–1986	Newcastle United	1	(0)
1986–1992	Hartlepool United	247	(7)
1990	→ Manchester United (loan)	0	(0)
1992–1996	Motherwell	152	(8)
1996–1998	Twente	50	(1)
1998–2000	Hearts	19	(0)
1999	→ Hartlepool United	7	(0)
2000	→ Carlisle United	8	(0)
2000–2002	Clydebank	51	(1)
2002–2005	Bellshill Athletic		
2005–2006	East Kilbride Thistle		
Total		532	(17)

International career
1993–1995	Scotland	3	(0)
1994–1995	Scotland B	3	(0)
- * Club domestic league appearances and goals

Robert McKinnon (born 31 July 1966) is a Scottish former footballer who played at both professional and international levels as a left back.

Active in Scotland, England, and the Netherlands, McKinnon made over 500 League appearances in a career which lasted from 1985 to 2002.

== Career ==
=== Early years in England ===
Born in Glasgow, McKinnon played youth football in East Kilbride where his father coached a team. He began his career playing Junior football with Rutherglen Glencairn before turning professional in 1985 with Newcastle United; however he only played one league game for the Magpies, a heavy defeat to Tottenham in which he was replaced by Paul Gascoigne (whose career was also in its infancy).

McKinnon moved on to Hartlepool United, where he helped the club achieve promotion from English football's fourth tier in 1990–91. He also spent a short time on loan at Manchester United, although he did not play a competitive match for them.

=== Motherwell ===
In January 1992 McKinnon returned to Scotland and joined Scottish Premier Division club Motherwell. He formed part of a strong team built by manager Tommy McLean and his successor Alex McLeish - Motherwell achieved third place in 1993–94 and were runners-up in 1994–95, and McKinnon gained international recognition along with teammates Chris McCart, Brian Martin and Paul Lambert.

However, Motherwell could not afford the wages to keep the players, and McKinnon and Lambert decided to move to continental clubs on a free transfer when their contracts expired in summer 1996 under the recently implemented Bosman ruling. Lambert signed for Borussia Dortmund, and McKinnon made the move to Dutch football, joining FC Twente.

=== Eredivisie and return ===
McKinnon played regularly with Twente in the Eredivisie for two seasons – in the first, the team finished third and qualified for the following year's UEFA Cup. He returned to Scotland with Hearts on another free transfer, but was unable to hold down a regular place in the side. He went back to Hartlepool on loan during 1999, and had another loan with Carlisle United in 2000 before being released by Hearts.

He then moved down the divisions with Clydebank for two seasons, before reverting to Junior football in 2002 with Bellshill Athletic where he had a period as player-coach alongside former Motherwell teammate Tommy Coyne. Finally he turned out for hometown club East Kilbride Thistle at the age of 39.

=== International ===
McKinnon was capped three times by the Scottish national side between 1993 and 1995 while playing with Motherwell, as well as appearing for the B side in the same period.

== Personal life ==
His nephew Ross McKinnon is also a footballer and plays as a defender.

== Honours ==
Individual

- PFA Team of the Year: 1989–90 Fourth Division
- SPFA Team of the Year: 1994
