= Shrewsbury Town F.C. =

Association football club in England

Shrewsbury Town
- Full name: Shrewsbury Town Football Club
- Nicknames: The Shrews; Salop
- Founded: 20 May 1886; 140 years ago
- Ground: New Meadow
- Capacity: 9,875
- Owner: Biscayne ST LLC
- Chairman: Scott Davidson
- Manager: Gavin Cowan
- League: EFL League Two
- 2025–26: EFL League Two, 19th of 24
- Website: shrewsburytown.com
Home colours	Away colours

Shrewsbury Town Football Club is a professional association football club based in Shrewsbury, Shropshire, England. The team currently competes in EFL League Two, the fourth tier of the English football league system.

Founded in 1886, the club were inaugural members of the Shropshire & District League in 1890 and then joined the Birmingham & District League five years later. Crowned champions in 1922–23, they switched to the Midland League in 1937 and won the Midland League title in 1937–38, 1945–46 and 1947–48. Shrewsbury were admitted into the Football League in 1950 and won promotion out of the Fourth Division at the end of the 1958–59 season. They were promoted again in 1974–75 after being relegated the previous year, and went on to win the Third Division title in 1978–79. They returned to the fourth tier following relegations in 1989 and 1992, where they won another league title in 1993–94. The club lost in the 1996 Football League Trophy final and dropped into non-League football after suffering relegations in 1997 and 2003.

Shrewsbury immediately regained their Football League status after winning the 2004 Conference play-off final. They subsequently lost League Two play-off finals in 2007 and 2009 before they won automatic promotion in 2011–12 and again in 2014–15 after relegation in the previous season. They finished as runners-up in the 2018 EFL Trophy final and 2018 League One play-off final.

The club plays its home games at New Meadow, having moved from the Gay Meadow in 2007. They have won the Shropshire Senior Cup a record 67 times and are the only club from the county to ever play in the Football League.

== History ==
=== Early history ===
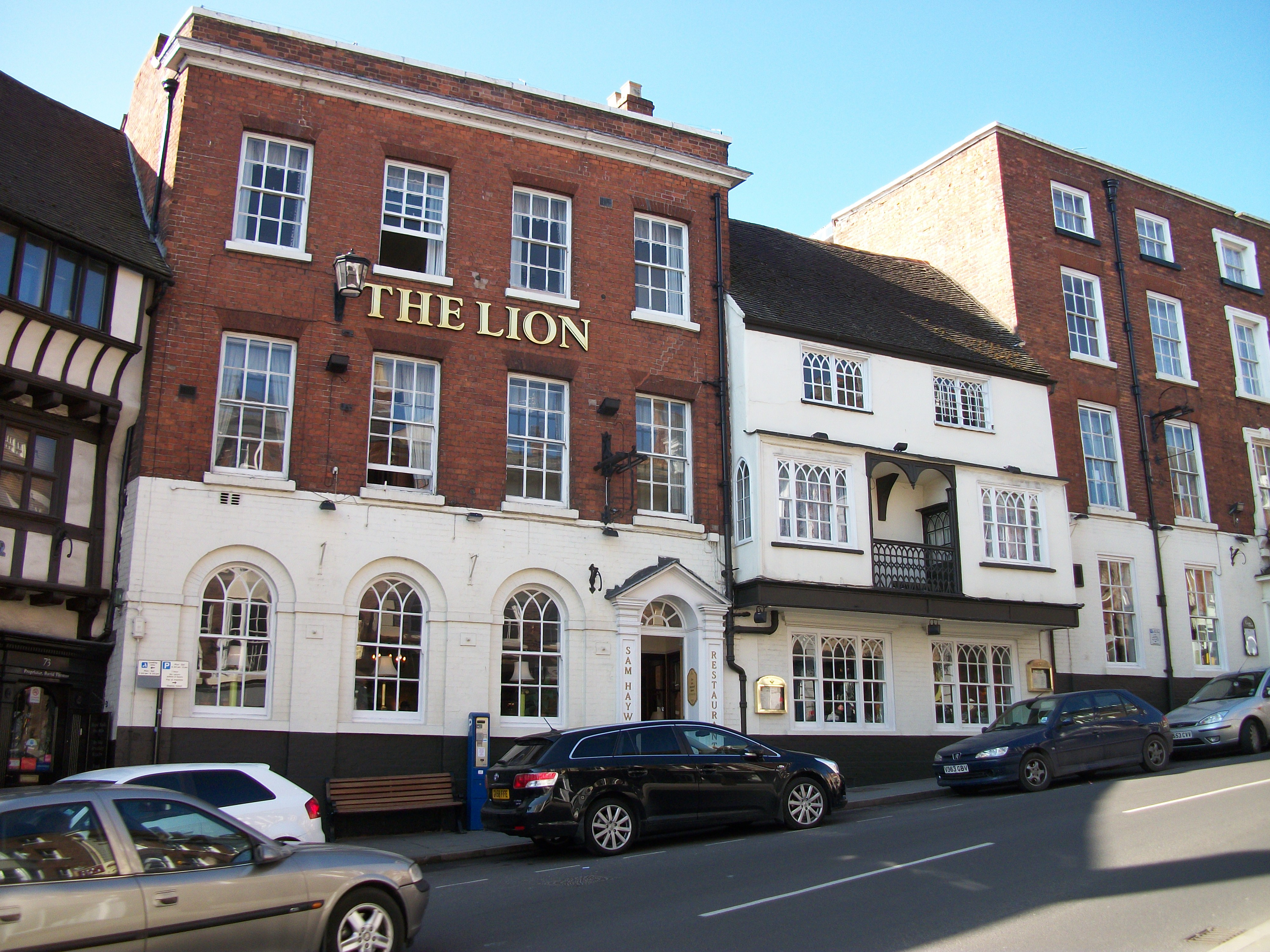
Some reports indicate the club being founded at The Lion Hotel

The first club in the town was the Shrewsbury Football Club, founded in 1868, which in the 1877–78 football season won both the Birmingham Senior Cup and Shropshire Senior Cup, and was captained by John Hawley Edwards. It disbanded in around 1880.

The present Shrewsbury Town were formed in 1886, following the demise of first Shropshire Wanderers and later indirectly Castle Blues. Press reports differ as to the exact date the new club was formed, The Eddowes Shropshire Journal of 26 May 1886 reported the birth of the club at The Lion Hotel, Wyle Cop, Shrewsbury. The Shrewsbury Chronicle reported the club being formed at the Turf Hotel, Claremont Hill, Shrewsbury. It may be both accounts are true, with a get-together at The Lion being finalised at the Turf.

After friendlies and regional cup competitions for the first few seasons, Shrewsbury were founder members of the Shropshire & District League in 1890–91, later admitted to the Birmingham & District League in 1895–96. Many of the teams Town faced in the early days have vanished, however Shrewsbury met many of today's Football League and Conference teams, including Crewe Alexandra, Coventry City, Stoke City, Kidderminster Harriers and Stafford Rangers.

In 1910, Shrewsbury looked to move to a new ground, having spent early years at locations across the town, notably near Copthorne Barracks west of the town. The club moved to Gay Meadow on the edge of the town centre, within sight of Shrewsbury Abbey, and stayed 97 years.

Shrewsbury's Birmingham League days were mostly mid-table, with a few seasons challenging near the top, the club being league champions in 1922–23.

A move to the Midland League in 1937–38 saw the club enjoy one of its most successful seasons, winning a league and cup treble. Shrewsbury were league champions, scoring 111 goals . In addition, the Welsh Cup was won following a replay, the team enjoyed a run in the FA Cup, and won the Shropshire Senior Cup.

After a run of good seasons in post-war years, Shrewsbury were admitted, alongside Scunthorpe United to the old Division 3 (North) of the Football League in 1950, after being Midland League champions in 1949–50, following the decision to expand from 88 to 92 clubs.

=== Football League history ===
Elevation to the football league in 1950 saw the club play one season in the Northern section of the third division, followed by a further seven in the Southern section, this before they became founder members of the newly formed fourth division in 1958–59, gaining immediate promotion as runners-up to Mansfield Town at the first attempt. Shrewsbury gained their first promotion, to the Third Division, in 1958–59. They remained in the third tier 15 years, slipping back to Division Four at the end of 1973–74.

Chart of yearly table positions of The Shrews in the Football League.

1960–61 season saw Shrewsbury Town reach the Semi Final of the League Cup. After beating Everton in the quarter-finals, they narrowly lost over two legs 4–3 on aggregate to Rotherham United. This era was also remembered for Arthur Rowley. He arrived from Leicester City in 1958, the club's first player/manager. During his playing and managerial career, he broke Dixie Dean's goal-scoring record, scoring his 380th league goal against Bradford City at Valley Parade on 29 April 1961. Retiring from playing in 1965 he remained manager until July 1968.

Shrewsbury were promoted to the Third Division in 1974–75 as runners-up, before another successful season in 1978–79, when they were league champions under Ritchie Barker and later Graham Turner. Over 14,000 fans packed Gay Meadow on 17 May 1979 to see Shrewsbury seal promotion with a 4–1 win over Exeter City. In addition, the club beat First Division Manchester City 2–0 in an FA Cup run that saw them reach the quarter-finals for the first time, before they lost in a replay to Wolverhampton Wanderers. Turner is the team's most successful manager, winning the Third Division Championship in 1978–79 – his first season in charge – to take the club into the Second Division for the first time. They remained in the division for ten years, although Turner departed for Aston Villa in 1984. Shrewsbury again reached the FA Cup quarter-finals in 1981–82, defeating the UEFA Cup holders Ipswich Town in the fifth round before losing 5–2 away to Leicester City.

The 1980s saw many big teams defeated by Shrewsbury, including Fulham, Newcastle United, Blackburn Rovers, West Ham United and Chelsea. Shrewsbury beat Middlesbrough 2–1 at Gay Meadow at the end of the 1985–86 season to relegate their opponents, who went out of business and almost out of existence. The match was marred by violence from Middlesbrough fans, with many of them later having to return to Shrewsbury for court appearances.

In the early to mid-1980s the club enjoyed its most successful Football League run. Shrewsbury survived through the sale of players, including Steve Ogrizovic, David Moyes, John McGinlay and Bernard McNally. They were relegated at the end of 1988–89 after ten years. In the Third Division, on 22 December 1990, Gary Shaw scored the quickest Town hat trick – 4 minutes and 32 seconds – against Bradford City at Valley Parade. At the end of 1991–92, three years after relegation to the Third Division, the club was relegated to the Fourth – the first time since 1975. However, two seasons later Shrewsbury won the new (fourth tier) Division Three championship under Fred Davies in 1993–94, and remained in Division Two (third tier) for three seasons.

The 1990s saw Shrewsbury make their first appearance at Wembley as finalists in the 1995–96 Football League Trophy final. They lost 2–1 to Rotherham United, with future Shrewsbury striker Nigel Jemson scoring both Rotherham goals. Now owned by Roland Wycherley, Shrewsbury slipped down to the bottom division again at the end of 1996–97. Davies was sacked in May 1997 to make way for the former club captain Jake King to return to the club where he began his career, following a successful reign at local rivals Telford United.

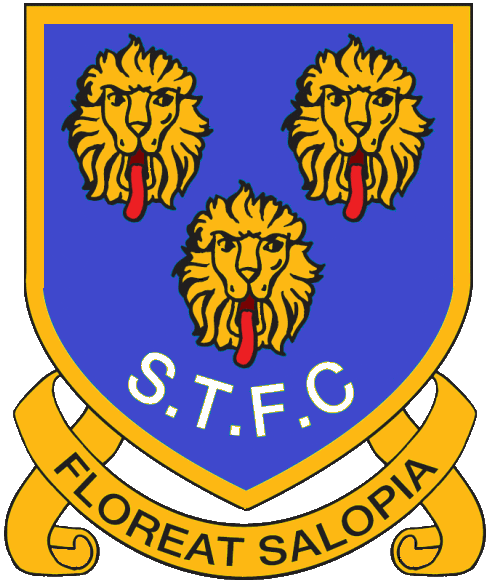
Loggerheads emblem used by the club between 1993 and 2007

In 1999–2000, Shrewsbury endured a poor season, and in mid-November 1999 King was sacked as the club neared relegation. The former Everton captain and Welsh international Kevin Ratcliffe joined from Chester City as manager and saved Shrewsbury from relegation on the final day of the season with a 2–1 victory away to Exeter City. The season was known as the 'Great Escape'. Subsequently Town made steady progress with Luke Rodgers emerging as a regular goalscorer, and they narrowly missed the 2001–02 league play-offs after a final-day defeat to Luton Town.

=== Relegation from the Football League ===
The 2002–03 season saw Shrewsbury enjoy an FA Cup run. After dispatching non-league sides Stafford Rangers and Barrow, they hit the headlines when Nigel Jemson struck twice to beat Everton 2–1 at Gay Meadow in the third round in front of 7,800 spectators. Watched by a near-capacity crowd of 7,950, Town lost 4–0 in the fourth round to Chelsea in a match televised on BBC's Match of the Day, with Gianfranco Zola scoring twice. The side's form then disappeared, and they picked up just two further wins as they were relegated from the Football League after 53 years. Following angry demonstrations from fans, Ratcliffe resigned, and Mark Atkins took temporary charge for the club's final League game, a 2–1 defeat to Scunthorpe United, who coincidentally had been Shrewsbury's first League opponents in 1950.

The Northwich Victoria manager Jimmy Quinn was appointed Shrewsbury's manager in May 2003. With most of the previous year's players released, Quinn assembled a whole new squad, with experienced non-league players such as Darren Tinson and Jake Sedgemore joined by Colin Cramb, Scott Howie and former League Cup finalist Martin O'Connor. The league title went to Chester City, but with 74 points, Shrewsbury finished third and defeated Barnet on penalties in the play-off semi-finals to set up a final against Aldershot Town, at Stoke City's Britannia Stadium. After a 1–1 draw, Shrewsbury's goalkeeper Scott Howie saved three consecutive Aldershot penalties in another penalty shoot-out, and the defender Trevor Challis scored the winning kick.

=== Return to the EFL ===
Quinn departed 14 league games into the 2004–05 season, and was replaced by the former Preston North End manager Gary Peters, who preserved Shrewsbury's Football League status in League Two. Meanwhile, the club had unearthed two talented local players in Joe Hart and David Edwards, who both went on to become experienced internationals.

Despite the departure of their goalkeeper Hart to Manchester City, Shrewsbury went on a 14-match unbeaten run in the 2006–07 season. Following a 2–2 draw against Grimsby Town in the final League match to be held at Gay Meadow, they finished in seventh place to qualify for the play-offs, where they defeated Milton Keynes Dons in the semi-finals. The team lost to Bristol Rovers in the final on 26 May 2007 at the new Wembley Stadium in front of a record crowd for any fourth-tier game of 61,589.

Club chairman Roland Wycherley cut the first sod of soil at Shrewsbury's New Meadow ground in the summer of 2006 and the club moved permanently for the 2007–08 season. Peters left the club on 3 March 2008 by mutual consent, and his replacement, Paul Simpson, led the club to an 18th-place finish in the league. After the season, the kit manufacturer Prostar earned the naming rights of the stadium.

The 2008–09 season saw Shrewsbury reach the play-offs again, after they beat Dagenham and Redbridge on the final day of the season. They beat Bury 4–3 on penalties in the semi-finals, with Luke Daniels making two saves to send Shrewsbury through, but lost 1–0 to Gillingham in the play-off final, with a goal in the 90th minute by Gillingham's Simeon Jackson. On 30 April 2010, after a disappointing 2009–10 season, Simpson was dismissed with two games remaining.

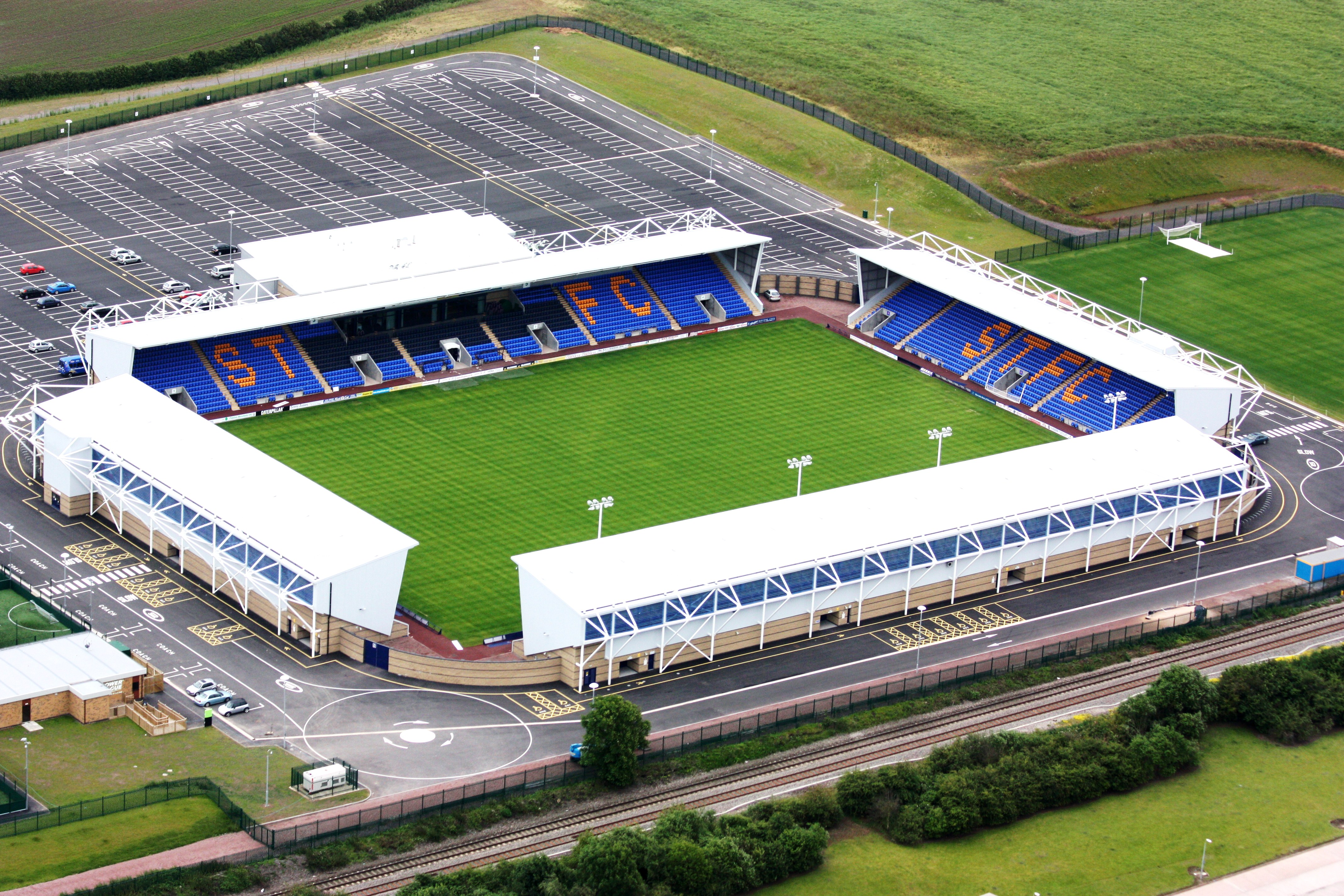
New Meadow

Graham Turner returned to Shrewsbury Town as manager in June 2010. The club finished the 2010–11 season in fourth place, missing automatic promotion by one point. They lost 2–0 on aggregate in the play-off semi-final to Torquay United. In the 2011–12 season they finished second on 88 points, and beat Dagenham & Redbridge 1–0 with a James Collins header in the penultimate game of the season to achieve promotion to League One after a 15-year absence. Shrewsbury also enjoyed a notable run in the League Cup, beating Derby County at Pride Park and Premier League Swansea City, before losing 3–1 to Arsenal after James Collins headed them in front at the Emirates Stadium.

Shrewsbury exceeded expectations in the 2012–13 season and sealed League One safety with two games to spare by beating Oldham Athletic 1–0, finishing 16th. The first half of the following season was disappointing, and Turner quit in January and relegation was confirmed after a 4–2 home defeat against Peterborough United.

In May 2014 the ex-Fleetwood Town boss Micky Mellon was appointed manager. Town were promoted back to League One on 25 April 2015 with a 1–0 victory away to Cheltenham Town via Jean-Louis Akpa Akpro's goal. Mellon left for Tranmere Rovers in October 2016, and was replaced by the Grimsby Town manager Paul Hurst, with Shrewsbury bottom. In 2017–18, Hurst led Shrewsbury to the EFL Trophy Final, which they lost to Lincoln City. He also led the team to the League One play-offs, but they lost to Rotherham United after extra time. Hurst left to join Ipswich Town on 30 May 2018. He was replaced by former Macclesfield boss John Askey, who was sacked in November 2018 having won just five of their opening 21 games. His successor, Sam Ricketts was appointed manager in December.

=== Recent history ===
A highlight of the 2019–20 season was a fourth round FA Cup tie against the European champions Liverpool, which Shrewsbury drew 2–2. Town narrowly lost the replay 1–0 at Anfield in front of an attendance of 52,399. However, following disruption to the season in March 2020 due to COVID-19, final League One standings were decided on a points per game basis with Shrewsbury finishing in 15th place. In November 2020, Ricketts was sacked with Shrewsbury in 23rd place and was replaced by Steve Cotterill. He helped Shrewsbury to a five-year high of 12th place in 2023, then stepped down in June 2023 and was replaced by Matt Taylor, who lasted less than seven months as manager. On 24 January 2024, the club confirmed the reappointment of Paul Hurst as head coach. Shortly after club owner Roland Wycherley announced (in September 2024) that a sale of the club was imminent, Hurst was sacked in October 2024. He was replaced by Gareth Ainsworth, who then left in March 2025, being succeeded by Michael Appleton. The club was then relegated to League Two for the first time in ten years. In February 2026 Gavin Cowan replaced Appleton with the club two points from the relegation places. Cowan led The Shrews on a run of 19 points from 27 to help retain their EFL status.

Following a poor start to their 2026–27 League Two season, unhappy Shrewsbury fans issued an ultimatum to Wycherley to answer questions about the club's continually delayed sale; this was quickly followed by a 7 September announcement of the club's impending sale to an American consortium led by Miami-based Scott Davidson and involving former USA goalkeeper Brad Friedel. Wycherley said the deal had been in discussion since March 2026. The takeover was confirmed on 9 November 2026.

== Stadiums ==
=== Racecourse Ground ===
The Racecourse Ground was used in Monkmoor between 1886 and 1889. Town's first ground hosted 51 matches over 3 years. The majority of these were friendlies as Town were not members of any league. Their first game was a 5–2 victory over Wellington Town on 16 October 1886 at the Racecourse Ground.

=== Ambler's Field ===
Copthorne 1889–1893 Town spent 4 seasons at Ambler's Field, Copthorne between 1889 and 1893. Here they were founder members of the Shropshire and District League started in 1890. 22 February 1890 saw town's record victory which was 18–0 against Wellington Town (Bowdler 8, Phasey 3, Rowlands 2 Gosson 3 Aston and Murphy). Town played 44 times at this ground.

=== Sutton Lane ===
Sutton Farm 1893–1895 Town played 47 times in 2 seasons at Sutton Lane, Sutton Farm and when they moved from here, they also moved up to the Birmingham League. This ground is now allotments.

=== Barracks Ground ===
Town played at Barracks Ground, Copthorne for 15 years, over 300 matches between 1895 and 1910 against more classier opposition of reserve teams like Aston Villa and Wolves. In 1909–10 they reached the first round of the FA Cup.

=== Gay Meadow ===
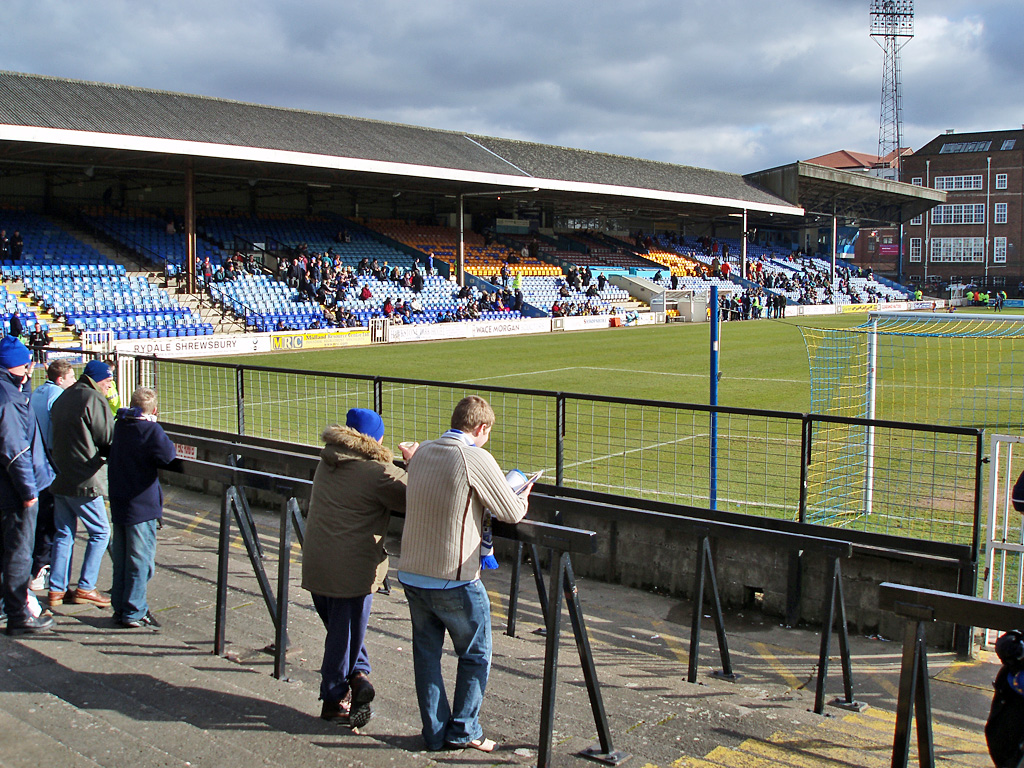
Gay Meadow, shown here in 2006

Shrewsbury played at Gay Meadow, Abbey Foregate between 1910 and 2007. For many years, Shrewsbury coracle maker Fred Davies achieved some notability amongst football fans, by a unique service he and his coracle provided. He would sit in his coracle during Shrewsbury Town home matches, and retrieve any stray footballs that went into the River Severn. Although Davies died long ago, his legend is still associated with the club.

=== New Meadow ===
A new stadium was opened in July 2007 on Oteley Road, Meole Brace. It features a 9,875 all-seater capacity in four separate stands for football.

Stands of New Meadow
Name	Capacity
Roland Wycherley Stand	2,741
Hatfields West Stand	3,317
Salop Leisure South Stand	1,955
SY Comms North Stand	1,796

Capacity for concerts at the stadium is 17,000.

The ground has conference facilities, a function area, snack bars, licensed bars, a club shop and a restaurant. Within the stadium confines are training facilities for the club and a 5-a-side football complex which is run The Shrewsbury Town Foundation.

The first match at the stadium was 4–0 win against A-line Allstars featuring Gianfranco Zola on 14 July 2007. The first league match was a 1–0 win against Bradford City with Dave Hibbert scoring the winner. Shrewsbury's record victory at this ground is 7–0 against Gillingham on 13 September 2008 in League Two. The record attendance at New Meadow is 10,210 vs. Chelsea in the 2014–15 Football League Cup. The record league attendance at New Meadow was 9,510 for a League One tie against Wolverhampton Wanderers in September 2013.

The England under-18s, under-19s, under-20s, under-21s and England women's senior team have all played at the stadium. The England Women's team have played three matches at New Meadow. For sponsorship reasons, the stadium has been named The Croud Meadow since June 2023.

== Club colours ==
Home colours,
1890s.
Home colours,
1978–1982.

The club's colours have always featured blue. However, blue has not always been the most dominant colour. Early kits included blue and white stripes, quartered shirts and all-blue shirts, which were worn with either white or amber trim until 1978. In 1978 Shrewsbury's most famous kit was introduced – the blue and amber stripes, which they wore as they were promoted in successive seasons, up to the old second division (now the Football League Championship). This was the design worn by character Derek Smalls in the movie This Is Spinal Tap.

The club was not loyal to the stripes for long, and in 1982 reverted to a blue shirt, then used a blue body with amber sleeves, later reverting to an amber body with blue sleeves. In 1987 the shirts radically changed to white shirts for four seasons before reverting to stripes in 1991–92. After a flamboyant abstract pattern on the shirts in 1992–93, Shrewsbury's kits have stayed mostly blue, with amber stripe(s) of some description evident since 1999.

The shirt sponsors have, since their introduction in 1982 until 2017, all been local companies. As of the 2017–18 season, the current shirt sponsor is The Energy Check, a South Shields-based Energy management company.

== Club crest ==
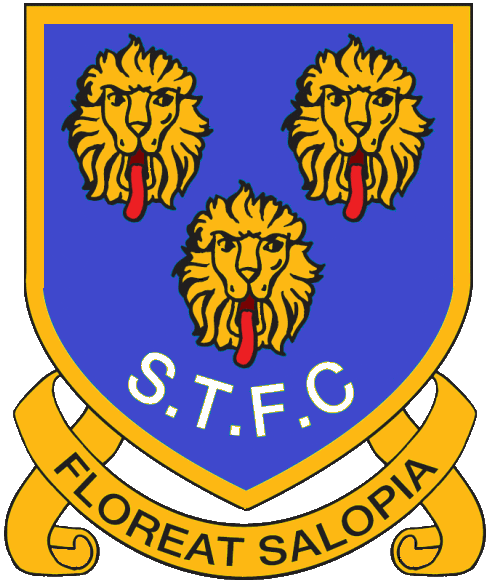
1993–2007

The first crest to appear on the shirt of Shrewsbury Town was the town's coat of arms, The Loggerheads in 1907. The crest was used intermittently on shirts until 1960 through to 1970, when a generic football design was used. During this time, The Loggerheads continued to be used on other merchandise, such as match-day programmes. The Loggerheads returned in 1970, and in various guises continued to be used until 1986, when a "Shrew" cartoon was introduced as the club's crest in an attempt to rebrand "Salop" as "The Shrews". During this time, the club's kit was also changed to predominantly white. A campaign by fanzine "A Large Scotch" eventually led to the return of The Loggerheads crest in 1992. The crest changed once in again in 2007 to coincide with Salop's move to New Meadow, the new badge featured a single lion's head in a circle. The club stated that the new badge was necessary as any design incorporating The Loggerheads could not be copyrighted.

== Kit suppliers ==
Over the years the club has had many different kit suppliers, the most recent being Umbro at the start of the 2021/22 season. It marked the return to the famous double diamond after the supplier manufactured the clubs kits during the most successful period in its history, which was from 1973 to 1982. From the start of the 2024/25 season, Oxen will become the clubs new technical kit supplier.

Period	Supplier
2024/25 - Present	(England) Oxen
2021/22 - 2023/24	(England) Umbro
2019/20 - 2020/21	(England) Admiral
2015/16 - 2018/19	(Italy) Errea
2013/14 - 2014/15	(England) Surridge Sport
2010/11 - 2012/13	(Spain) Joma
2008/09 - 2009/10	(England) Prostar

Previous kit suppliers include A-Line, in 2007/2008, MG Sportswear and Patrick throughout the 1990s and early 2000s, and Spall in the mid to late 1980s.

== Supporters and rivalries ==
The club has many supporters groups from different areas of the nationally and internationally, including locally throughout Shropshire, Wales, Scotland, London and internationally in Italy (where there is a team called Shrewsbury Town in a league in Milan). Most recently there is a large supporters group in Portland, Oregon, where there are ties with the MLS side Portland Timbers. In 2019, a group named South Stand Flags was set up after the opening of New Meadow's safe standing section in order to "improve atmosphere at home games". The group, usually based in block 9 of the South Stand, organise choreography and flag displays. Their first fundraiser raised over £1000 which funded the purchase of 50 new flags. The group has gained of praise from players and managers, including the ex-Shrewsbury boss Sam Ricketts.

In late 2019 the club started attracting fans from the small Caribbean island nation of Grenada. The support stemmed from the club having two Grenada internationals, Aaron Pierre and Omar Beckles, who helped the nation to a six-match unbeaten run in qualifying for the CONCACAF Gold Cup. The president of the Grenada Football Association, Cheney Joseph, adopted The Shrews as his team, stating "I have fallen in love with Shrewsbury. I'm serious. I believe they can become a dream story, a Cinderella story". In November 2019, Joseph sent a partnership offer to the club, as well as a formal invitation for Town chairman Roland Wycherley to visit the country. On 9 November, Oliver Norburn became the third Town player to be called up by Grenada, whom he qualified for through his paternal grandfather. On 26 January 2020, Joseph made his first visit to his adopted club, where he witnessed The Shrews come back from 2–0 down to draw 2–2 with Liverpool.

=== Rivals ===
The club maintains several rivalries. The rivalry with near-neighbours Hereford United was ranked nineteenth in The Daily Telegraph's Twenty fiercest rivalries in English football in 2015. Known as the 'A49 derby' due to the road that connects Shrewsbury with Hereford, it has not been played since Hereford United went out of business and reformed as Hereford FC, who now play in the National League North, three divisions below The Shrews. This is similar to the rivalry with the now defunct Chester City. In 2010, a new club was formed named Chester FC who, like Hereford, also compete in the National League North and are yet to meet Shrewsbury in any competition. Another rivalry for the Shrews is with Welsh club Wrexham. Following Wrexham's relegation from the Football League in 2008, the fixture was not competed again until 2024 for an FA Cup match. The two sides also met in League One during the 2024–25 season.

The club's other main rivals include Walsall, Wolverhampton Wanderers, Port Vale and Shropshire rivals AFC Telford United.

== Ownership & staff ==
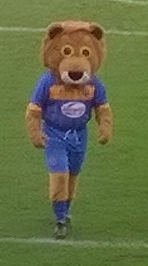
Lenny the Lion, club mascot

=== Ownership group & club officials ===
As of 9 November 2026

Position	Name
Owner	(United States) Biscayne ST LLC
Investor	(United States) Atlantic Football Ventures
Chairman	(United States) Scott Davidson
Sporting Director	(United States) Brad Friedel
Director	(United States) Will Dotson
Associate Investor	(United States) Bryan Finnerty (AFV)
Director	(Scotland) Craig Graham
Director	(United Kingdom) Duncan Montgomery
Chief Executive Officer & Director	(England) Liam Dooley
Director of Finance	(England) Andrew Crane
President	(England) Malcolm Starkey
Honorary Patron	(England) Sir David Lees
Foundation Director	(England) Shin Aujla
Head of Football Administration	(England) Jayne Bebb

=== First-team coaching & support staff ===
As of 26 February 2026

Position	Name
First-Team Manager	(England) Gavin Cowan
Assistant Manager	(Wales) Dave Edwards
Assistant Manager	(England) Jamie Haynes
First-Team Coach	(Wales) Sean Parrish
Goalkeeping Coach	(England) Harry Burgoyne
Head of Physical Performance	(England) Daryl Taylor
Sports Scientist	(England) Ben Pritchard
Head of Medical Performance	(England) Chris Skitt
Sports Therapist	(England) Aaron Lambley
Head of Recruitment	(England) Tom Ware
First-Team Scout	(England) Chuks Aneke
Head of Performance Analysis	(England) Stephen Corns
First-Team Analyst	(England) Ben Parker
Kit Manager	Vacant

=== Academy coaching and support staff ===
As of 10 April 2026

Position	Name
Academy Manager	(England) Charlie Musselwhite
Head of Academy Coaching	(Wales) Dan Reece
Head of Academy Goalkeeping	Vacant
Head of Academy Strength & Conditioning	(England) Billy Clark
Head of Academy Medical	(England) Robert Morris
Head of Academy Performance Analysis	Vacant
Head of Education	(England) Matthew Digwood
Head of Player Care	(Wales) Natalie Wood
Lead Professional Development Phase Coach	(England) Sean McAllister
Lead Youth Development Phase Coach	(Wales) Dave Riley
Lead Foundation Phase Coach	(England) Jack Pate
Academy Secretary	(England) Louise Taylor

=== Women's first-team coaching & support staff ===
As of 17 June 2026

Position	Name
Operations & People Director	(England) Leanne Rimmer
Commercial & Finance Director	(England) Brogan Cook
Director of Football	(England) Chloe Hudson-Jones
Manager	(England) Dean Craven
Goalkeeping Coach	(England) Ryan Watson
Physiotherapist	(England) Shannon Davis
Sports Psychologist	(England) Dr Andrew Wood
Analyst	(England) Jay Miller
Media	(England) Jack Tyler

== Players ==
=== Current squad ===
As of 31 August 2026

Note: Flags indicate national team as defined under FIFA eligibility rules; some limited exceptions apply. Players may hold more than one non-FIFA nationality.

No.	Pos.	Nation	Player
1	GK	ENG	Will Brook
2	DF	WAL	Luca Hoole
3	DF	ENG	Josh Ruffels
4	MF	ENG	Isaac England
5	DF	ENG	Will Boyle (captain)
6	DF	ENG	Sam Stubbs
7	MF	ENG	Jay Turner-Cooke
8	MF	ENG	Isaac Fletcher
9	FW	ENG	George Lloyd
10	DF	ENG	Tom Sang
11	DF	ENG	Kevin Berkoe
12	GK	ENG	Sam Proctor (on loan from Aston Villa)
13	FW	ENG	Josh Davison
17	DF	LCA	Arkell Jude-Boyd
18	FW	IRL	Kian McMahon-Brown (on loan from Burnley)
19	MF	ENG	Jack Price

No.	Pos.	Nation	Player
20	MF	ENG	Michael Golding (on loan from Leicester City)
21	MF	ENG	Will Gray
22	DF	ENG	Byron Pendleton
23	DF	KOR	Isaac Lee
24	DF	ENG	Lino Sousa (on loan from Aston Villa)
26	DF	ENG	Tom Anderson
27	FW	ENG	Joe Gbodé (on loan from Luton Town)
30	MF	ENG	Jeval Thompson-McKenzie
32	GK	ENG	Cameron Gregory
33	DF	ENG	Oliver Hall
35	MF	ENG	Harry Fallon
36	MF	ENG	Jayden Rattray
37	MF	ENG	Fin Tait
38	FW	ENG	Kameni Ngomsi
46	FW	ENG	Hugo Aiston

=== Out on loan ===
Note: Flags indicate national team as defined under FIFA eligibility rules; some limited exceptions apply. Players may hold more than one non-FIFA nationality.

No.	Pos.	Nation	Player
28	FW	ENG	Jay Snook (at Nuneaton Town until End Of The Season)
29	DF	ENG	Reuben Falding (at Kidsgrove Athletic until End Of The Season)
—	FW	IRL	Ricardo Dinanga (at Spartans until 10 January 2027)
—	FW	ENG	Callum Stewart (at Kidderminster Harriers until 7 November 2026)

=== Notable former players ===
==== Record holders ====
Mickey Brown holds the club record for most league appearances 418, accumulated during three spells. However Colin Griffin (footballer) holds the record number of total appearances with 497. Centre half turned centre forward Alf Wood scored 5 goals in the 7–1 victory against Blackburn Rovers in 1971 and became the first player since Dixie Dean to score four headed goals in one match.

==== Cult heroes ====
In 2004, the BBC's Football Focus ran polls to determine club's cult heroes, and Dean Spink was named as Shrewsbury's cult hero, ahead of Steve Anthrobus and Austin Berkley.

== Foundation ==
The Shrewsbury Town FC Foundation is the club's official charity that carries out community work in the local community and surrounding areas. The foundation helps provide opportunities to children and adults by offering many different programmes. These include health and wellbeing, veteran support, education, and employability. The foundation also provides football development and participation opportunities. These consist of walking football, disability football and soccer schools. It also provides football development programs in the form of the Shrewsbury Town development centres based at the clubs stadium and a second centre which acts as a satellite hub is based in Ludlow, South Shropshire. It consists of under 8s to under 11s training squads and competitive youth development teams, under 12s to under 16s, in which they represent Shrewsbury Town by training and playing in a competitive league system. Advanced coaching is performed to help progress players onto the clubs player pathway, via the Shrewsbury Town academy, or generally elsewhere into academy football, or onto further opportunities with the foundation and football club. A girls emerging talent centre is also organised and supported by the foundation.

== Managerial history ==
- W. Adams (1905–1912)
- S. Wilcox (1912–1934)
- Jack Roscamp (1934–1935)
- Stan Ramsay (1935–1936)
- Ted Bousted (1936–1940)
- Leslie Knighton (1945–1949)
- Harry Chapman (1949–1950)
- Sammy Crooks (1950–1954)
- Walter Rowley (1955–1957)
- Harry Potts (1957–1958)
- Johnny Spuhler (1958)
- Arthur Rowley (1958–1968)
- Harry Gregg (1968–1972)
- Maurice Evans (1972–1974)
- Alan Durban (1974–1978)
- Richie Barker (1978)
- Graham Turner (1978–1984)
- Chic Bates (1984–1987)
- Ken Brown (1987)
- Ian McNeill (1987–1990)
- Asa Hartford (1990–1991)
- John Bond (1991–1993)
- Fred Davies (1993–1997)
- Jake King (1997–1999)
- Chic Bates (1999)
- Kevin Ratcliffe (1999–2003)
- Mark Atkins (2003)
- Jimmy Quinn (2003–2004)
- Chic Bates (2004)
- Gary Peters (2004–2008)
- Paul Simpson (2008–2010)
- Graham Turner (2010–2014)
- Michael Jackson (2014)
- Micky Mellon (2014–2016)
- Danny Coyne (2016)
- Paul Hurst (2016–2018)
- John Askey (2018)
- Sam Ricketts (2018–2020)
- Steve Cotterill (2020–2023)
- Matt Taylor (2023–2024)
- Paul Hurst (2024)
- Gareth Ainsworth (2024–2025)
- Michael Appleton (2025–2026)
- Gavin Cowan (2026-Present)

== Club records ==
- Best FA Cup performance: Quarter-finals, 1978–79, 1981–82
- Best League Cup performance: Semi-finals, 1960–61
- Record attendance at Gay Meadow: 18,917 vs. Walsall, Third Division, 26 April 1961
- Record attendance at New Meadow: 10,210 vs. Chelsea, League Cup fourth round, 28 October 2014
- Record attendance for a Shrewsbury Town match: 61,589 vs. Bristol Rovers (at Wembley Stadium), 2007 Football League Two play-off final, 26 May 2007
- Record victory: 21–0 vs. Mold Alyn Stars, Welsh FA Cup 1st round, 27 October 1894
- Record League victory: 12–1 vs. Hereford City, Shropshire & District League, 20 October 1894
- Record defeat: 0–13 vs. Small Heath, Birmingham League, 25 December 1895
- Most league goals in a season
  38: Arthur Rowley (1958–59)
- Most league goals in total
  152: Arthur Rowley (1958–65)
- Most league appearances
  418: Mickey Brown (1986–91, 1992–94, 1996–2001)
- Most appearances
  497: Colin Griffin (1976–1988)

== Honours ==
League

- Third Division (level 3)
  - Champions: 1978–79
- Fourth Division / Third Division / League Two (level 4)
  - Champions: 1993–94
  - Runners-up: 1974–75, 2011–12, 2014–15
  - Promoted: 1958–59
- Conference (level 5)
  - Play-off winners: 2004
- Birmingham & District League
  - Champions: 1922–23
  - Runners-up: 1913–14, 1923–24, 1936–37
- Midland League
  - Champions: 1937–38, 1945–46, 1947–48

Cup

- Football League Trophy / EFL Trophy
  - Runners-up: 1995–96, 2017–18
- Welsh Cup
  - Winners: 1890–91, 1937–38, 1976–77, 1978–79, 1983–84, 1984–85
  - Runners-up: 1930–31, 1947–48, 1979–80

Minor

- Shropshire and District League
  - Runners-up: 1890–91
- Mid Wales League
  - Winners: 1934–35, 1935–36
- Central League
  - Winners: 2009, 2013
- Central League Cup
  - Winners: 2006
- Shropshire Senior Cup
  - Winners (67) - A Record
- Herefordshire Senior Cup
  - Winners: 1951, 1986, 1998
  - Runners up: 1973, 1987
- Walsall Senior Cup
  - Winners: 1924, 1925, 1926
- Shropshire Mayors Charity Cup
  - Winners: 1890, 1893, 1902, 1903, 1908, 1909, 1925
  - Runners up: 1889, 1895, 1898, 1899, 1905, 1906, 1923, 1939, 1948
- Keys Cup
  - Winners: 1924, 1937

== Bibliography ==
- Jones, Mike (2004). Breathe on 'em Salop: The Second Coming : the Official History of Shrewsbury Town Football Club. Shrewsbury: Salop Sporting Services. ISBN 0-9548099-1-2.
