= PFA Scotland =

Association for professional footballers in Scotland

- Predecessor: Scottish Professional Footballers' Association
- Formation: 2007; 19 years ago
- Members: 1,618 (2024)
- Chief Executive: Fraser Wishart
- President: Tony Higgins
- Affiliations: STUC; FIFPRO
- Website: pfascotland.co.uk

The Professional Footballers' Association Scotland (PFA Scotland) is the association for professional footballers in Scotland. It was known as the Scottish Professional Footballers' Association (SPFA), but that organisation was dissolved and replaced by PFA Scotland in 2007. PFA Scotland is affiliated to the (English) Professional Footballers' Association and the worldwide union FIFPro. The SPFA used to be affiliated to the GMB union.

As of 2021, Fraser Wishart (chief executive) and Tony Higgins (president) were two of the principal officers of the organisation, while former players Craig Beattie and Chris Higgins were among the administrative staff, with Stuart Lovell among its former employees. Active players who have served as chairman of the committee include Jack Ross, John Rankin and Liam Craig.

Each year it presents the Players' Player of the Year, the Young Player of the Year, and the Manager of the Year awards.
