= Cheney Joseph =

Grenadian football player

Association football career
International career
Years	Team	Apps	(Gls)
- Grenada

Cheney Joseph is a Grenadian former footballer.

He played in the infamous Barbados 4–2 Grenada game during the 1994 Caribbean Cup qualification campaign.

Joseph has been a member of the Caribbean Football Union since May 2012.

Joseph is an adopted "supporter" of English club Shrewsbury Town.
