= Innes Ritchie =

Scottish footballer

Personal information
- Full name: Innes Telford Ritchie
- Date of birth: 24 August 1973 (age 53)
- Place of birth: Edinburgh, Scotland
- Height: 1.83 m (6 ft 0 in)
- Position: Central defender

Youth career
- Chelsea
- Motherwell Boys Club

Senior career*
Years	Team	Apps	(Gls)
1992–1997	Motherwell	11	(0)
- → Bathgate Thistle (loan)
1997–1998	East Fife	43	(2)
1998	Berwick Rangers	9	(0)
1998–1999	Clydebank	13	(0)
1999–2001	Berwick Rangers	71	(7)
2001–2003	Arbroath	64	(6)
2003–2007	Cowdenbeath	101	(13)
- Bathgate Thistle
- * Club domestic league appearances and goals

Innes Ritchie (born 24 August 1973) is a Scottish retired semi-professional footballer who played as a central defender in the Scottish League for Cowdenbeath, Berwick Rangers, Arbroath, East Fife, Clydebank and Motherwell.

== Career statistics ==
Appearances and goals by club, season and competition
Club	Season	League			Scottish Cup		League Cup		Other		Total	
Club	Season	Division	Apps	Goals	Apps	Goals	Apps	Goals	Apps	Goals	Apps	Goals
East Fife	1996–97	Scottish First Division	13	0	2	0	0	0	—		15	0
East Fife	1997–98	Scottish Second Division	30	2	1	0	1	0	2 (Note: Appearances in Scottish Challenge Cup)	0	34	2
East Fife	Total		43	2	3	0	1	0	2	0	49	2
Berwick Rangers	1998–99	Scottish Third Division	9	0	0	0	0	0	0	0	9	0
Clydebank	1998–99	Scottish First Division	13	0	4	2	0	0	0	0	17	2
Berwick Rangers	1999–00	Scottish Third Division	31	5	3	0	1	0	2	0	37	5
Berwick Rangers	2000–01	Scottish Second Division	36	2	5	0	1	0	0	0	42	2
Berwick Rangers	2001–02	Scottish Second Division	4	0	0	0	0	0	1	1	5	1
Berwick Rangers	Total		80	7	8	0	2	0	3	1	93	8
Arbroath	2001–02	Scottish First Division	31	5	1	0	1	0	1 (Note: Appearance in Forfarshire Cup)	0	34	5
Arbroath	2002–03	Scottish First Division	33	1	1	0	1	0	1	0	36	1
Arbroath	Total		64	6	2	0	2	0	2	0	70	6
Cowdenbeath	2003–04	Scottish Third Division	29	4	2	0	1	0	0	0	32	4
Cowdenbeath	2004–05	Scottish Third Division	30	2	1	0	1	0	2	0	34	2
Cowdenbeath	2005–06	Scottish Third Division	24	6	1	0	1	0	1	0	27	6
Cowdenbeath	2006–07	Scottish Second Division	18	1	2	0	0	0	2	0	22	1
Cowdenbeath	Total		101	13	6	0	3	0	5	0	115	13
Career total			301	28	23	2	8	0	12	1	344	31

== Honours ==
Berwick Rangers

- Scottish League Third Division second-place promotion: 1999–00

Cowdenbeath

- Scottish League Third Division: 2005–06

Individual

- Cowdenbeath Hall of Fame
