= Marc Millar =

Scottish footballer

Personal information
- Date of birth: 10 April 1969 (age 57)
- Place of birth: Dundee, Scotland
- Position: Midfielder

Senior career*
Years	Team	Apps	(Gls)
1991–1994	Brechin City	123	(27)
1994–1999	Dunfermline Athletic	141	(21)
1999–2000	Livingston	26	(6)
2000	St Johnstone	8	(2)
2000–2002	Ross County	22	(0)
2002	Raith Rovers	8	(0)
2002–2004	Brechin City	47	(5)
2004–2005	Arbroath	18	(0)
2005–2006	Cowdenbeath	38	(4)
Total		431	(65)
- * Club domestic league appearances and goals

Marc Millar (born 10 April 1969) is a Scottish former footballer.

Millar played in eight Scottish Premier League games for St Johnstone during the 1999–2000 Scottish Premier League season. Soon after signing for St Johnstone, he scored the winning goal in a Tayside derby against Dundee.
