= Éric Garcin =

French footballer (born 1965)

Personal information
- Full name: Éric Paul Maurice Garcin
- Date of birth: 6 December 1965 (age 60)
- Place of birth: Avignon, France
- Height: 1.80 m (5 ft 11 in)
- Position: Defender

Senior career*
Years	Team	Apps	(Gls)
1982–1985	Olympique Avignon		
1985–1986	Toulouse	1	(0)
1986–1987	did not play		
1987–1993	Nîmes Olympique	140	(12)
1993–1996	Le Mans	117	(1)
1996–1997	Toulouse	32	(1)
1997–1998	Motherwell	11	(1)
1998	Dundee	3	(0)
1999	Le Mans	4	(0)

Managerial career
- 2001: Grenoble (assistant)
- 2001: Grenoble
- 2001–2004: Grenoble (assistant)
- 2005–2006: Stade Reims (assistant)
- 2006–2012: FC Rouen
- * Club domestic league appearances and goals

Éric Paul Maurice Garcin (born 6 December 1965) is a French professional football coach and a former player.
