= John Fraser (footballer, born 1978) =

Scottish footballer

Personal information
- Full name: John Fraser
- Date of birth: 17 January 1978 (age 48)
- Place of birth: Dunfermline, Scotland
- Position: Midfielder

Youth career
- 1993–1995: Oakley United
- 1995–1996: Dunfermline Athletic

Senior career*
Years	Team	Apps	(Gls)
1996–1999	Dunfermline Athletic	15	(0)
1999–2001	Ross County	55	(1)
2001–2004	Clyde	74	(6)
2004–2005	Stranraer	20	(1)
2005–2007	Stirling Albion	48	(1)
2007–2008	Forfar Athletic	23	(2)
2008–2009	Arbroath	12	(0)
- * Club domestic league appearances and goals as of 8 April 2010

John Fraser (born 17 January 1978 in Dunfermline) is a Scottish footballer.

== Career ==
Fraser began his career with hometown club Dunfermline Athletic, before moving to Ross County

Fraser then joined Clyde, where he was an integral part of the midfield which almost won promotion to the Scottish Premier League.

Fraser was released by Clyde in 2004, and joined Stranraer, where he won promotion from the Scottish Second Division to the First, but he was released at the end of the season. He then joined Stirling Albion and once again won promotion from the Second Division, and subsequently released. Fraser joined Forfar Athletic in July 2007, and was made club captain. However, Forfar finished bottom of the Scottish Third Division in 2007–08 season, and Fraser signed for recently promoted Arbroath in May 2008.
