= Gunnlaugur Jónsson =

Icelandic footballer and manager

Personal information
- Date of birth: 29 November 1974 (age 51)
- Place of birth: Iceland
- Height: 1.87 m (6 ft 2 in)
- Position: Defender

Senior career*
Years	Team	Apps	(Gls)
1993–1997	ÍA	38	(1)
1997–1998	Motherwell	2	(0)
1998	Kongsvinger	5	(0)
1998	Örebro	1	(0)
1999–2000	ÍA	31	(0)
2000–2001	KFC Uerdingen 05	18	(2)
2001–2005	ÍA	85	(6)
2005–2008	KR	45	(1)
2009	Selfoss	9	(0)

International career
1997–2002	Iceland	12	(0)

Managerial career
- 2009: Selfoss
- 2009–2010: Valur
- 2011–2012: KA
- 2013: HK
- 2014–2017: ÍA
- 2018: Þróttur
- * Club domestic league appearances and goals

Gunnlaugur Jónsson (born 29 November 1974) is an Icelandic football manager who last managed Þróttur in the 1. deild karla.

In his early career he played for ÍA. After short spells with Motherwell, Kongsvinger and Örebro, he rejoined ÍA, and played there until 2005, except for a spell at KFC Uerdingen 05. He then played with KR before starting his managing career at Selfoss. At his first season, Selfoss were promoted to Úrvalsdeild. However, Gunnlaugur decided to switch teams, spending two seasons with Valur, as well as KA for another two seasons. Gunnlaugur managed HK in the 2013 season, before once again returning to ÍA, from 2013 to 2017. He then dropped down a division to manage Þróttur for the 2018 season.

He was capped 12 times for the Icelandic national team.
