= Mario Dorner =

Austrian professional footballer

Personal information
- Full name: Mario Dorner
- Date of birth: 21 March 1970 (age 56)
- Place of birth: Baden bei Wien, Austria
- Height: 1.78 m (5 ft 10 in)
- Position: Forward

Senior career*
Years	Team	Apps	(Gls)
1990–1991	SR Donaufeld	?	(?)
1991–1992	FC Admira/Wacker	22	(1)
1992–1993	Kremser SC	?	(?)
1993–1994	LASK Linz	?	(?)
1994–1995	SKN St. Pölten	?	(?)
1995–1997	VfB Mödling	5	(0)
1997	Motherwell	2	(0)
1997–1999	Darlington	50	(13)
1999–2004	FC Lustenau 07	?	(?)
2004–2005	SC Ritzing	10	(1)
2005	SC Neudörfl	?	(?)
2005–2006	SK Wiesmath	?	(?)
2006–2008	ASK Oberpetersdorf	?	(?)
2008–	1. SVG Gumpoldskirchen	38	(5)
- * Club domestic league appearances and goals

Mario Dorner (born 21 March 1970) is an Austrian professional footballer who played as a forward for Darlington in the Football League.
