= Dougie Arnott =

Scottish footballer (born 1964)

Personal information
- Full name: Douglas Arnott
- Date of birth: 5 August 1961 (age 65)
- Place of birth: Lanark, Scotland
- Height: 5 ft 7 in (1.70 m)
- Position: Striker

Senior career*
Years	Team	Apps	(Gls)
1985–1986	Pollok		
1986–1998	Motherwell	240	(56)
- * Club domestic league appearances and goals

Douglas Arnott (born 5 August 1961 in Lanark) is a Scottish former footballer who played as a striker. Arnott's career began at Pollok at the Scottish Junior level, before spending his entire senior football career at Motherwell, spending twelve seasons with the Fir Park club before retiring due to an injury in 1998. In 1990–91, Arnott was part of Motherwell's Scottish Cup-winning side, which was his only senior honour.

On 11 September 2008, Arnott's belated testimonial match went ahead against an Old Firm select. Other players lined up for Arnott's side included former goalkeeper Sieb Dijkstra and defenders Chris McCart and Fraser Wishart, while the Old Firm team included Ally McCoist and Gordon Durie. The Old Firm side won 5–4, in a game which saw Arnott score the first of the match, and Ally McCoist net a hat-trick.

== Retirement ==
Since retiring from football, Arnott has purchased a number of pubs, including "The Wee Thackit" in Carluke.

== Honours ==
- Scottish Cup: 1

1990–91
