= Chris McCart =

Scottish footballer

Personal information
- Full name: Christopher McCart
- Date of birth: 17 April 1967 (age 59)
- Place of birth: Baillieston, Scotland
- Height: 6 ft 2 in (1.88 m)
- Position: Defender

Youth career
- Celtic Boys Club
- Motherwell

Senior career*
Years	Team	Apps	(Gls)
1985–1997	Motherwell	260	(6)
1997–1999	Falkirk	30	(2)

International career
1990	SFA (SFL centenary)	1	(0)
1994–1995	Scotland B	2	(1)

Managerial career
- 1999–2008: Motherwell (Youth coach)
- 2008–: Celtic (Head of Youth Development)
- * Club domestic league appearances and goals

Christopher McCart (born 17 April 1967) is a Scottish former footballer who played as a defender.

== Playing career ==
McCart was born in Baillieston. He started his career at Motherwell where he was voted player of the year in 1991. McCart spent the next twelve seasons with the Fir Park before a short spell with Falkirk. In 1990–91, McCart was part of Motherwell's Scottish Cup-winning side, while also winning the Scottish Challenge Cup with Falkirk in 1997–98.

== Coaching career ==
After retiring from playing, McCart held a youth coaching role at former club Motherwell before joining Celtic as head of youth development in June 2008 following the death of Tommy Burns. Liverpool and Scotland full back Andy Robertson later stated in 2017 that McCart emphasised a more physical approach than had previously been the case at Celtic, and that this was instrumental in him (Robertson) being released from the club as a 15-year-old. Future internationals Declan Gallagher, Stuart Findlay, Jackson Irvine and Stephen O'Donnell also left Celtic before achieving better results elsewhere, but McCart played a role in the development of the likes of James Forrest, Callum McGregor and Kieran Tierney into top level players.

On 11 September 2008, McCart played for a Motherwell side in Dougie Arnott's belated testimonial match against an Old Firm select.

== Personal life ==
His son Jamie McCart is also a footballer and a defender, who began his career as an academy player at Celtic.

== Honours ==
Motherwell

- Scottish Cup: 1990–91

Falkirk

- Scottish Challenge Cup: 1997–98
