= Brian Martin (footballer, born 1963) =

Scottish footballer (born 1963)

Personal information
- Date of birth: 24 February 1963 (age 63)
- Place of birth: Bellshill, Scotland
- Position: Defender

Youth career
- Plains BC

Senior career*
Years	Team	Apps	(Gls)
1980–1981	Albion Rovers	10	(0)
1981	Stenhousemuir	6	(0)
1981–1985	Shotts Bon Accord		
1985–1987	Falkirk	59	(0)
1987–1988	Hamilton Academical	30	(0)
1988–1991	St Mirren	129	(9)
1991–1998	Motherwell	237	(10)
1998	Stirling Albion	45	(1)
1999–2000	Partick Thistle	16	(0)
2000–2001	Lanark United		
2001–2002	Stonehouse Violet		
2002–2003	Shotts Bon Accord		
2003–2005	Cambuslang Rangers		
Total		532	(20)

International career
1995–1996	Scotland B	3	(0)
1995	Scotland	2	(0)
- * Club domestic league appearances and goals

Brian Martin (born 24 February 1963) is a Scottish former footballer who played as a central defender, best known for his seven-year spell at Motherwell.

== Club career ==
Martin began his career in the Scottish lower leagues with Albion Rovers and Stenhousemuir. He then dropped back into the Junior grade with Shotts Bon Accord for three years before joining second-tier Falkirk in 1985. In his first season with the Bairns the club achieved promotion to the top division, and maintained their status in the second.

In 1987 Martin moved to Hamilton Academical, and in his single campaign there he again helped the Accies win promotion, this time as champions. By then he had already moved on to St Mirren, where he stayed for three seasons in the Scottish Premier Division before being signed by fellow top-level club Motherwell in November 1991 for £175,000. He made 237 appearances for Motherwell between 1991 and 1998, and was part of the side which finished league runners-up in 1995. He was named in SPFA Team of the Year for 1994.

Martin left Motherwell in 1998 and had spells with Stirling Albion and Partick Thistle before retiring from the professional leagues in 2000, aged 37. He returned to local Junior football, appearing for Lanark United, Stonehouse Violet, Shotts - two decades after his first spell there, and Cambuslang Rangers, also playing the occasional game for the 'Motherwell Legends' team.

== International career ==
While playing for Motherwell, Martin earned two caps for the Scotland national team (making his debut aged 32) in the 1995 Kirin Cup matches against Ecuador and Japan alongside clubmates Rab McKinnon and Paul Lambert. He also represented the B side on three occasions in the same era.
