= Fraser Wishart =

Scottish footballer (born 1965)

Personal information
- Date of birth: 1 March 1965 (age 61)
- Place of birth: Johnstone, Scotland
- Height: 1.73 m (5 ft 8 in)
- Position: Defender

Youth career
- 1981–1983: Pollok

Senior career*
Years	Team	Apps	(Gls)
1983–1989	Motherwell	154	(5)
1989–1992	St Mirren	51	(0)
1992	Dumbarton	2	(0)
1992–1993	Falkirk	24	(2)
1993–1995	Rangers	9	(0)
1995–1996	Heart of Midlothian	9	(0)
1996–1997	Motherwell	18	(0)
1997–2001	Clydebank	111	(1)
2001–2002	Airdrieonians	9	(0)
Total		387	(8)

International career
1989	Scotland	1	(0)
- * Club domestic league appearances and goals

Fraser Wishart (born 1 March 1965) is a Scottish former professional footballer, former Secretary of the Scottish Professional Footballers' Association, and current chief executive of the Professional Footballers' Association Scotland. He is also an occasional radio and television commentator.

== Early life ==
Johnstone-born Wishart grew up in south Glasgow, attending Hillpark Secondary School, where he played in the school team.

He began his football career with Eastercraig Boys' Club, a successful youth team in Glasgow, followed by spells at amateur club, Giffnock North and semi-professional giants, Pollok Juniors.

== Playing career ==
Wishart signed with Scottish Premier Division team Motherwell in 1983, and under manager Tommy McLean he established himself as a regular full back, making over 150 appearances for the team over the next six years.

In 1989, he was transferred to St Mirren for £285,000, an amount set by tribunal after the two clubs could not agree on a fee. Three years later he moved to Falkirk, before enjoying the most high-profile period of his career when Walter Smith signed him for Glasgow Rangers in 1993. However, he made only nine appearances for the club in the next two years before moving on to Hearts in 1995, followed by a second spell at former club Motherwell in 1996.

He was transferred to Clydebank in 1997, where he spent four years both as a player and coach during the club's turbulent final seasons. By this point Wishart was already working at the players' union as assistant to Tony Higgins. From Clydebank, he then moved to the similarly troubled Airdrieonians in 2001.

== International ==
Wishart made his senior debut for Scotland on 30th May 1989, in a 2-0 Rous Cup tie win over Chile, at Hampden Park. This was his only full cap for Scotland.
