= Kevin Christie (footballer) =

Scottish footballer (born 1976)

Personal information
- Date of birth: 1 April 1976 (age 50)
- Place of birth: Aberdeen, Scotland
- Position: Defender

Youth career
- Lewis United

Senior career*
Years	Team	Apps	(Gls)
1994–1997	Aberdeen	4	(0)
1997	East Fife	9	(3)
1997–1999	Motherwell	38	(0)
1999–2004	Falkirk	81	(9)
2004–2007	Airdrie United	41	(2)
Total		166	(14)
- * Club domestic league appearances and goals

Kevin Christie (born 1 April 1976) is a Scottish former footballer, who played for Aberdeen, East Fife, Motherwell, Falkirk, and Airdrie United. Christie started his senior career with the Lewis United Juniors.

After 45 appearances over two seasons he signed for Aberdeen Football Club his boyhood club. He only made four substitute appearances before signing for East Fife. After playing only nine games for the Fife team he secured a moved to Motherwell Football Club for a fee of £20,000. Christie left the Steelmen in the season 98/99 season to join Falkirk on a free transfer. At Falkirk he won the Scottish first division season 2002/03. Leaving Falkirk the following season to join Airdrie United, he won the Scottish second division. Christie played for another season with the Lanarkshire club, before retiring in 2006.
