= Scott Howie =

Scottish footballer

Personal information
- Full name: Scott Howie
- Date of birth: 4 January 1972 (age 54)
- Place of birth: Glasgow, Scotland
- Height: 6 ft 3 in (1.91 m)
- Position: Goalkeeper

Senior career*
Years	Team	Apps	(Gls)
1990–1991	Ferguslie United	33	(0)
1991–1993	Clyde	55	(0)
1993–1994	Norwich City	2	(0)
1994–1998	Motherwell	137	(0)
1998	→ Coventry City (loan)	0	(0)
1998–2001	Reading	85	(0)
2001–2003	Bristol Rovers	90	(0)
2003–2005	Shrewsbury Town	78	(0)
2005–2006	Cambridge United	33	(0)
2007–2009	King's Lynn	51	(0)
2009–2012	Wroxham	41	(0)
Total		605	(0)

International career
1993	Scotland U21	5	(0)
- * Club domestic league appearances and goals

Scott Howie (born 4 January 1972) is a Scottish former professional footballer who played as a goalkeeper. Having played professionally in the English and Scottish football leagues, he last played for English non-league side Wroxham.

Howie played for local non-league side Ferguslie United before joining Clyde in 1991, continuing to study for his Business Degree. He graduated with a BA from Strathclyde Business School in July 1994. Howie was capped by Scotland under-21s while with Clyde, making his debut against Malta and also appearing for Clyde later the same day. He also helped Clyde to the Scottish Second Division Championship.

In August 1993 he was sold to Norwich City for a fee of £300,000, but made just two first team appearances, both while regular goalkeeper Bryan Gunn was suspended. He was however a substitute for the UEFA Cup games against Vitesse Arnhem, Bayern Munich and Inter Milan.

With first team opportunities limited, Howie moved to Motherwell in October 1994, again costing £300,000. His form with Motherwell resulted in call-ups to the full Scotland team, although he never appeared at full international level. With Motherwell suffering financial problems, Howie refused to sign a new contract, restricting him from playing for a few months.

He joined Coventry City on loan in January 1998 and finally left Motherwell to join Reading for a fee of £30,000 on transfer deadline day in March 1998. Reading were relegated at the end of the season, but Howie remained with them until being released at the end of the 2000–2001 season.

In July 2001 he joined Bristol Rovers and was their player of the year the following season. Despite this, he was released in May 2003 at the end of the following season. He had a successful trial with Exeter City in July 2003, but failed to agree personal terms.

He joined Shrewsbury Town in August 2003 and played in the final of the 2004 Conference play-offs. The match went to penalties, and Howie saved three of the spot-kicks as The Shrews won promotion back to the Football League at the first attempt. At the end of the 2004–05 season, Howie was one of only two players, the other being Stuart Whitehead, to be offered a new contract by Shrewsbury manager Gary Peters. However, he was subsequently released and was on trial with Boston United in July 2005.

He joined Conference side Cambridge United in August 2005, where he played under the management of his former Norwich team-mate Rob Newman. He retired in May 2006, with the Cambridge Evening News reporting on 10 May 2006 that he had retired to concentrate on his tax consultancy business.

On retiring he agreed to make himself available as cover for Cambridge's goalkeepers. In April 2007 he joined King's Lynn. He was cover for regular King's Lynn keeper Paul Crichton the following season, but played as first choice goalkeeper during the 2008–09 season.

In June 2009 Howie joined Wroxham, playing at Wembley for them as they lost 6–1 to Whitley Bay in the FA Vase Final in May 2010.

Howie is a coach at Cringleford Junior Football Club, and has played for Wroxham alongside this coaching role.

== Honours ==
Clyde

- Scottish Second Division Champion: 1992–93

Shrewsbury Town

- Football Conference Play-offs Winner: 2004

King's Lynn

- Southern League Premier Division Champion: 2007–08
- Norfolk Senior Cup Winner: 2008–09
