= Ian Ross (footballer, born 1974) =

Scottish footballer

Personal information
- Date of birth: 27 August 1974 (age 52)
- Place of birth: Broxburn, Scotland
- Position: Midfielder

Youth career
- Motherwell Bathgate Thistle

Senior career*
| Years | Team | Apps | (Gls) |
| 1995–1999 | Motherwell | 63 | (3) |
| 1999–2003 | St Mirren | 80 | (8) |
| 2003–2005 | Partick Thistle | 30 | (0) |
| 2005 | Alloa Athletic | 10 | (5) |
| 2005–2006 | Stranraer | 14 | (2) |
| Total | | 197 | (18) |
- * Club domestic league appearances and goals

Ian Ross (born 27 August 1974) is a Scottish former professional footballer, who played for Motherwell, St Mirren, Partick Thistle, Alloa Athletic and Stranraer in the Scottish leagues.

2008 he was appointed Scottish FA Player & Coach Development Officer for the Central Region and University of Stirling 1st Team Head Coach in 2009 until December 2011. From 2012, he has been the dedicated head coach for the Scottish Football Association's Performance Schools project based at Graeme High School in Falkirk.
