= 2002–03 Scottish Challenge Cup =

2002–03 Challenge Cup
Tournament details
- Country: Scotland
- Teams: 30

Final positions
- Champions: Queen of the South
- Runners-up: Brechin City

Tournament statistics
- Matches played: 29

The 2002–03 Scottish Challenge Cup was the 12th season of the competition, competed for by all 30 members of the Scottish Football League. The defending champions were Airdrieonians, who defeated Alloa Athletic 2–1 in the 2001 final; and were unable to defend their title due to the club folding.

The final was played on 20 October 2002, between Queen of the South and Brechin City at Broadwood Stadium, Cumbernauld. Queen of the South won 2–0, to win the competition for the first time.

== Schedule ==
| Round | First match date | Fixtures | Clubs |
|---|---|---|---|
| First round | Tuesday 6 August 2002 | 14 | 30 → 16 |
| Second round | Tue/Wed 13/14 August 2002 | 8 | 16 → 8 |
| Quarter-finals | Tuesday 20 August 2002 | 4 | 8 → 4 |
| Semi-finals | Tuesday 27 August 2002 | 2 | 4 → 2 |
| Final | Sunday 20 October 2002 | 1 | 2 → 1 |

== First round ==
Alloa Athletic and Clyde received random byes into the second round.

| 6 August 2002 | Arbroath | 0–2 | Forfar Athletic | Gayfield Park, Arbroath |
| 18:45 | | Report | Tosh 25', 44' (pen.) | Attendance: 642; Referee: J Rowbotham |

| 6 August 2002 | Airdrie United | 3–0 | Raith Rovers | New Broomfield |
| 19:30 | Glancy 11'; McGuire 31'; Docherty 87' | Report | | Attendance: 1,649; Referee: I Brines |

| 6 August 2002 | Cowdenbeath | 0 – 2 (a.e.t.) | Ross County | Central Park, Cowdenbeath |
| 19:30 | Gifillan (red card) 101' | Report | Webb 118'; Gethins 119' | Attendance: 339; Referee: D Summers |

| 6 August 2002 | Elgin City | 1–4 | Brechin City | Borough Briggs, Elgin |
| 19:30 | Ross 31'; Tully (red card) 72' | Report | Templeman 41', 53'; Millar 51'; King 90' | Attendance: 505; Referee: A Freeland |

| 6 August 2002 | Montrose | 1–0 | Albion Rovers | Links Park, Montrose |
| 19:30 | Johnson 78' | Report | | Attendance: 320; Referee: G Mitchell |

| 6 August 2002 | Greenock Morton | 3–2 | Stirling Albion | Cappielow, Greenock |
| 19:30 | Williams 11', 83'; Hawke 48' | Report | Munro 28'; Nicholas 81' | Attendance: 1,100; Referee: C Hardy |

| 6 August 2002 | Peterhead | 0–2 | Queen of the South | Balmoor, Peterhead |
| 19:30 | | Report | O'Neill 74'; Weatherson 78' | Attendance: 562; Referee: K Toner |

| 6 August 2002 | Queen's Park | 2–1 | Gretna | Hampden Park, Glasgow |
| 19:30 | Canning 19'; Gemmell 82' | Report | Dobie 65'; Alexander (red card) 90' | Attendance: 602; Referee: I Frickleton |

| 6 August 2002 | St Mirren | 7–0 | East Stirlingshire | St Mirren Park, Paisley |
| 19:30 | Cameron 15', 27', 34', 41'; Guy 49'; Ross 76'; Gillies 85' | Report | | Attendance: 1,403; Referee: G Clyde |

| 6 August 2002 | Stenhousemuir | 1 – 1 (a.e.t.) (2–3 p) | Falkirk | Ochilview Park, Stenhousemuir |
| 19:30 | Wilson 74' | Report | Miller 55' | Attendance: 2,000; Referee: C Hamilton |

| 6 August 2002 | Stranraer | 1–2 | Ayr United | Stair Park, Stranraer |
| 19:30 | Farrell 78' | Report | Annand 25'; Grady 54' | Attendance: 835; Referee: H Dallas |

| 6 August 2002 | Berwick Rangers | 1–0 | Inverness Caledonian Thistle | Shielfield Park, Berwick-upon-Tweed |
| 19:45 | Bennett 67' (pen.) | Report | | Attendance: 338; Referee: J Underhill |

| 6 August 2002 | Dumbarton | 1–0 | East Fife | Strathclyde Homes Stadium, Dumbarton |
| 19:45 | Duffy 10' | Report | | Attendance: 452; Referee: C Melville |

| 6 August 2002 | St Johnstone | 3–0 | Hamilton Academical | McDiarmid Park, Perth |
| 19:45 | Stevenson 38'; McCann 69'; MacDonald 87' | Report | | Attendance: 1,538 |

Source: ESPN Soccernet

== Second round ==
| 13 August 2002 | Clyde | 1–2 | St Mirren | Broadwood Stadium, Cumbernauld |
| 19:30 | Hinds 47' | Report | Baltacha 2'; Gillies 34' (pen.) | Attendance: 1,284; Referee: Kenny Clark |

| 13 August 2002 | Forfar Athletic | 2 – 2 (a.e.t.) (5–6 p) | Queen's Park | Station Park, Forfar |
| 19:30 | Bavidge 65'; Tosh 114'; Brown (red card) 105'; McCulloch (red card) 119' | Report | Moffat 48', 105'; Gemmell (red card) 69'; Gallagher (red card) 116' | Attendance: 384; Referee: B McGarry |

| 13 August 2002 | Dumbarton | 3–0 | Ayr United | Strathclyde Homes Stadium, Dumbarton |
| 19:30 | Brown 42'; Dillon 50', 83'; McEwan (red card) 81' | Report | Black (red card) 37'; Nicolson (red card) 65' | Attendance: 938; Referee: B Cassidy |

| 13 August 2002 | Alloa Athletic | 0–1 | Ross County | Recreation Park, Alloa, Alloa |
| 19:30 | | Report | Ferguson 48' (o.g.) | Attendance: 416; Referee: W Young |

| 13 August 2002 | Berwick Rangers | 2–0 | Airdrie United | Shielfield Park, Berwick-upon-Tweed |
| 19:45 | Burke 11', 89' | Report | | Attendance: 560; Referee: C Murray |

| 13 August 2002 | Montrose | 0–2 | Falkirk | Links Park, Montrose |
| 19:45 | | Report | Miller 15'; James 45' | Attendance: 805; Referee: J Gilmour |

| 13 August 2002 | Queen of the South | 1–0 | Greenock Morton | Palmerston Park, Dumfries |
| 19:45 | O'Connor 83' | Report | Keenan (red card) 70'; Reilly (red card) 90'; Williams (red card) 90' | Attendance: 1,982; Referee: E Martindale |

| 14 August 2002 | Brechin City | 3–2 | St Johnstone | Glebe Park, Brechin |
| 19:30 | Grant 35', 84'; Dods 50' (o.g.) | Report | Murray 7'; MacDonald 43' | Attendance: 1,007; Referee: I Fyfe |

Source: ESPN Soccernet

== Quarter-finals ==
20 August 2002
19:30 BST

| Brechin City | 1 – 1 (a.e.t.) (5 – 3 pen.) | Falkirk |
|---|---|---|
| Fotheringham 89' | Report | McPherson 87'; McQuilken (red card) 111' |

Glebe Park, Brechin
Attendance: 844
Referee: A Freeland

20 August 2002
19:30 BST

| Ross County | 1 – 1 (a.e.t.) (5 – 6 pen.) | St Mirren |
|---|---|---|
| Gethins 42' | Report | Gillies 61' (pen.) |

Victoria Park, Dingwall
Attendance: 1,128
Referee: D McDonald

20 August 2002
19:45 BST

| Berwick Rangers | 1–2 | Queen's Park |
|---|---|---|
| Murie 39' | Report | Whelan 55' (pen.); Allen 64' |

Shielfield Park, Berwick-upon-Tweed
Attendance: 407
Referee: T Brown

20 August 2002
19:45 BST

| Queen of the South | 2–0 | Dumbarton |
|---|---|---|
| O'Neill 25'; Lyle 90' | Report |

Palmerston Park, Dumfries
Attendance: 1,722
Referee: J Underhill

== Semi-finals ==
27 August 2002
19:30 BST

| Queen's Park | 3–4 | Brechin City |
|---|---|---|
| Allen 26'; Gemmell 72'; Whelan 75' | Report | Millar 34'; Jackson 64'; Fotheringham 69' (pen.); Grant 73' |

Hampden Park, Glasgow
Attendance: 1,214
Referee: S Dougal

27 August 2002
19:45 BST

| St Mirren | 3–5 | Queen of the South |
|---|---|---|
| McGinty 12'; Cameron 43'; Fellner 80' | Report | Shields 7', 90'; Lyle 38'; Bowey 50'; Weatherson 89' |

St Mirren Park, Paisley
Attendance: 2,508
Referee: M McCurry

== Final ==
20 October 2002
15:00 BST

| Brechin City | 0–2 | Queen of the South |
|---|---|---|
| | Report | O'Neill 33'; Lyle 47' |

Broadwood Stadium, Cumbernauld
Attendance: 6,428
Referee: John Underhill
