= 2002 Scottish Challenge Cup final =

- Event: 2002–03 Scottish Challenge Cup
Brechin City	Queen of the South
0	2
- Date: 20 October 2002
- Venue: Broadwood Stadium, Cumbernauld
- Referee: J. R. Underhill
- Attendance: 6,428

The 2002 Scottish Challenge Cup final, also known as the Bell's Cup final for sponsorship reasons, was an association football match between Brechin City and Queen of the South on 20 October 2002 at Broadwood Stadium in Cumbernauld. It was the 12th final of the Scottish Challenge Cup since it was first organised in 1990 to celebrate the centenary of the Scottish Football League.

Both teams progressed through four knock-out rounds to reach the final. The match was Brechin City's first national cup final in its 96-year history whilst it was Queen of the South's second appearance in the final of the tournament having lost in 1997. The tournament was contested by clubs below the Scottish Premier League; Queen of the South from the First Division and Brechin City from the Second Division.

Queen of the South dominated most of the game with John O'Neill scoring the first goal in the 33rd minute. Two minutes into the second half, Derek Lyle scored a header to take a 2–0 lead. Brechin City had few chances to score and Queen of the South held on to win the tournament and a national cup competition for the first time.

== Route to the final ==
The competition is a knock-out tournament and in 2002 was contested by the 30 teams that played in the First, Second and Third Divisions of the Scottish Football League. Teams were paired at random and the winner of each match progressed to the next round and the loser was eliminated. The first round was contested by 28 of the teams and two received random byes into the second round.

=== Brechin City ===
Round	Opposition	Score
First round	Elgin City (a)	4–1
Second round	St Johnstone (h)	3–2
Quarter-final	Falkirk (h)	1–1 (a.e.t.) (5–3 pens.)
Semi-final	Queen's Park (a)	4–3

Brechin City entered the first round and were drawn to play Elgin City of the Third Division at Borough Briggs. Elgin took the lead in the 31st minute with a goal from David Ross but was short-lived; Chris Templeman equalised the score to 1–1 ten minutes later and Marc Millar scored early in the second half to give Brechin a 2–1 lead. Two minutes later, Templeman scored his second goal of the game and Charlie King concluded the win with a goal in the 90th minute to make it 4–1 and progress to the next round. Brechin played First Division club St Johnstone in the second round at home at Glebe Park. Grant Murray scored first for St Johnstone after seven minutes to take a 1–0 lead. Roddy Grant equalised for Brechin against his former club on 35 minutes before Peter MacDonald scored for St Johnstone to regain a 2–1 lead two minutes before half time. Brechin scored two goals in the second half; an own goal by Darren Dods and a second goal from Grant to produce a "shock" 3–2 win and advance to the quarter-finals.

In the quarter-finals, Brechin faced another home game against a First Division club, this time against Falkirk. The score was 0–0 for most of the game before Falkirk took the lead with only three minutes left to play with a goal from Craig McPherson. However, Brechin scored one minute before the end through Kevin Fotheringham to force extra time. The score remained equal after extra time so the winner was decided by a penalty shoot-out; Brechin winning 5–3. With four clubs left in the tournament, Brechin were drawn against Third Division club Queen's Park at Hampden Park. Queen's Park scored first through James Allan after 26 minutes but Brechin equalised before half time with a goal from Marc Millar. The rest of the game's five goals came during a nine-minute period in the second half; Brechin took a two-goal lead courtesy of Chris Jackson and Kevin Fotheringham to make the score 3–1 before goals from John Gemmell and Jonny Whelan for Queen's Park and Roddy Grant for Brechin made the scoreline 4–3 in favour of Brechin. Both teams had chances to score again before the end but the score stayed the same ensuring Brechin qualified for the first national cup final in the club's history.

=== Queen of the South ===
Round	Opposition	Score
First round	Peterhead (a)	2–0
Second round	Greenock Morton (h)	1–0
Quarter-final	Dumbarton (h)	2–0
Semi-final	St Mirren (a)	5–3

Queen of the South also entered the first round and were drawn to play Third Division club Peterhead away from home at Balmoor Stadium. Queen of the South dominated the majority of the game and scored two late goals in the second half from John O'Neill and Peter Weatherson to progress to the next round as 2–0 winners. In the second round Queen of the South played another Third Division club, Greenock Morton, at home at Palmerston Park. The game was marred with incidents with Dean Keenan, Colin Reilly and Alex Williams all being sent off for Greenock Morton. Sean O'Connor scored the winning goal for Queen of the South with only seven minutes left to play but shortly before the end sustained an injury from a tackle by Reilly which resulted in his sending off. Queen of the South won the game 1–0 and advanced to the quarter-finals.

In the quarter-finals, Queen of the South played Second Division club Dumbarton, also at Palmerston Park. John O'Neill scored his second goal of the tournament to give Queen of the South the lead after 25 minutes. Dumbarton had opportunities to score an equaliser for the remainder of the game but were denied by the home team's goalkeeper, Colin Scott. Despite Dumbarton's efforts, Queen of the South sealed the victory with a goal from Derek Lyle in the final minute of the match to win 2–0 and progress to the semi-finals. With four teams left in the tournament, Queen of the South travelled to Love Street to face fellow First Division club St Mirren. Paul Shields scored first for Queen of the South in the seventh minute but was cancelled out five minutes later with a goal from Brian McGinty to make it 1–1 before Derek Lyle put Queen of the South back in front shortly before half time. Early in the second half, both teams scored again; Martin Cameron for St Mirren and Steve Bowey for Queen of the South to make the scoreline 3–2 to the away team. With ten minutes left to play, Gerhard Fellner equalised for St Mirren to make it 3–3 but late goals in the final two minutes from a Peter Weatherson free kick and Shields' second goal of the game won the match 5–3 and sent Queen of the South into the final for the second time in its history.

== Pre-match ==
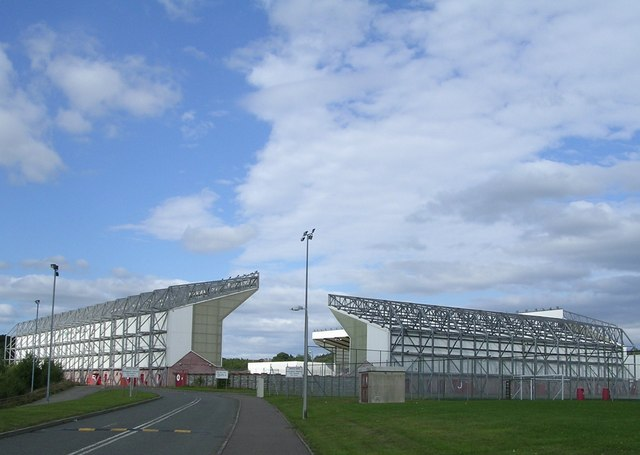
Broadwood Stadium hosted the final.

=== Venue ===
The 2002 final was hosted at Broadwood Stadium in Cumbernauld which had been Clyde's home since it was opened in 1994. The stadium hosted the final on three previous occasions; twice in the past two seasons and for the first time in 1996. The venue had a capacity of 8,000 and 4,500 tickets were allocated to Queen of the South who had a larger fan base and average home support than Brechin City, who were allocated around 2,500 tickets. Dumfries-based Queen of the South travelled approximately 77 miles (123.9 km) to the venue whereas Brechin City travelled around 94 miles (151.3 km).

=== Analysis ===
In order to reach the final, both Brechin City and Queen of the South played two matches at home and two away. Brechin scored twelve goals and conceded seven compared with Queen of the South's ten goals scored and only three conceded. Queen of the South kept a clean sheet in the first three rounds and were favourites to win the match being the higher ranked club as a competitor in the First Division, one tier above Brechin who were in the Second Division. At the time of the final Queen of the South were in bad league form, ranking second-last in the First Division with only two wins and eight points from 10 games. Brechin were in slightly better form, ranking 6th in the Second Division with four wins and 13 points from nine games before the cup final.

Brechin and Queen of the South were both aiming to win their second trophy in less than six months, having been crowned champions of the Third and Second Divisions respectively the previous season. Despite recent league success, Brechin had never reached the final of a national cup competition in its 96-year history whilst Queen of the South were making only their second appearance in a cup final since losing the 1997 final to Falkirk in the same competition.

== Match ==
=== First half ===
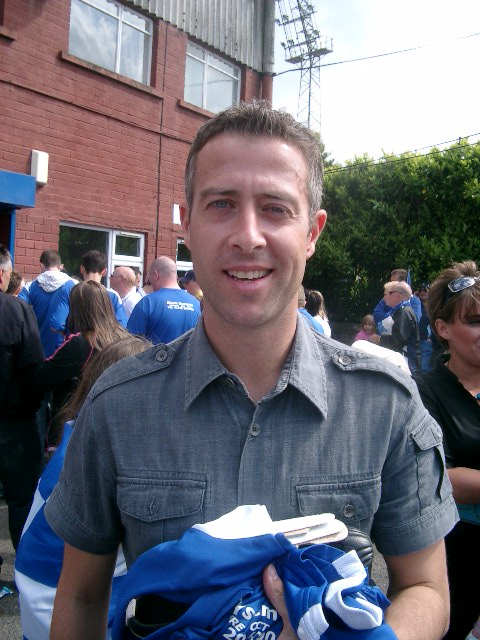
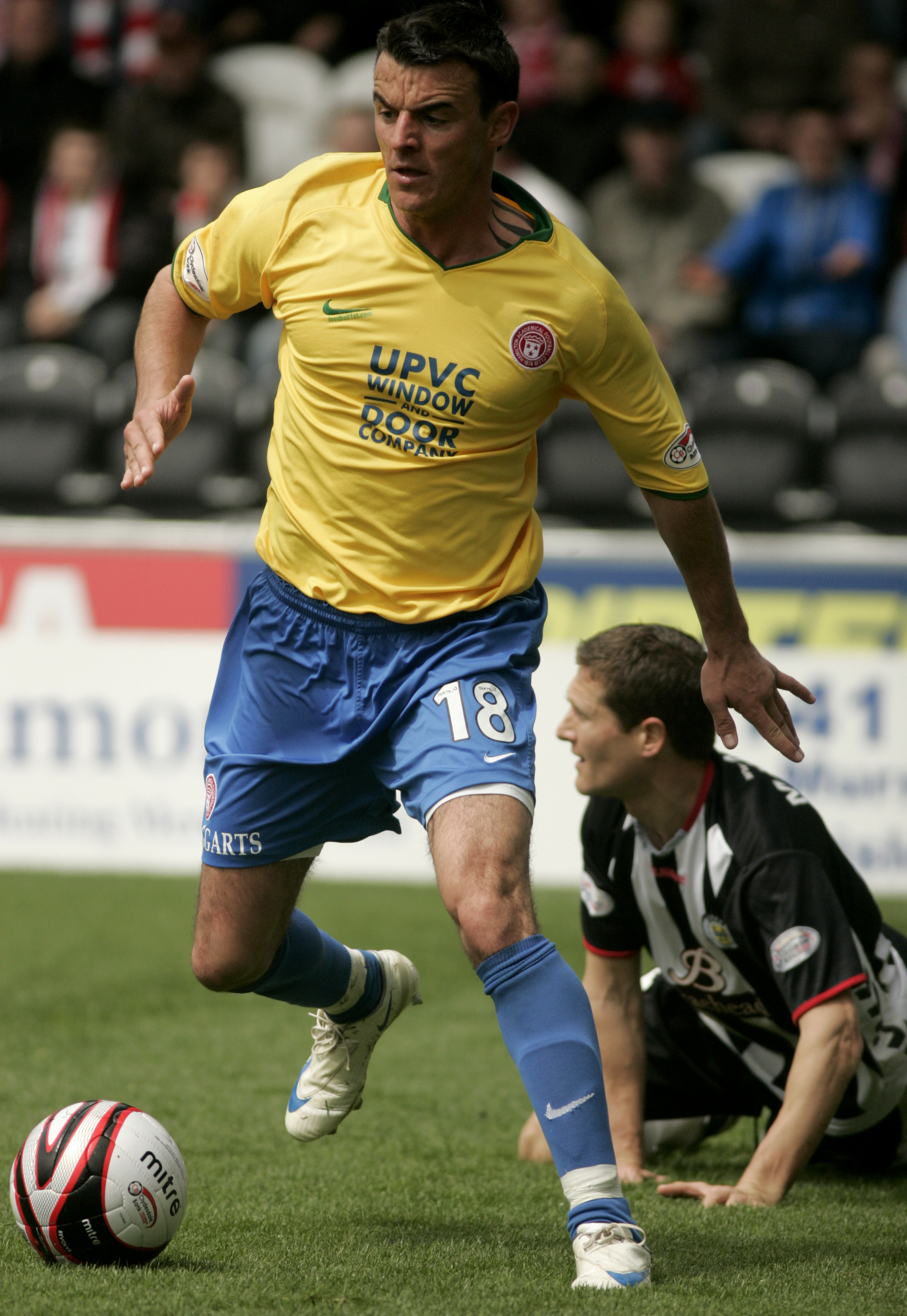
John O'Neill (left) and Derek Lyle both scored their third goals of the tournament in the final for Queen of the South.

Queen of the South started the game as the livelier team, pushing forward early on; however, Brechin City had the first goal scoring opportunity of the final when Graham Gibson's long range shot was saved by Queen of the South goalkeeper Andy Goram. Peter Weatherson had a similar opportunity for Queen of the South after a pass from Derek Lyle but was also saved by Brechin's goalkeeper, David Hay. Hay made another save 10 minutes later after another Weatherson attempt from Steve Bowey's pass. After 28 minutes, Brechin player Chris Jackson was booked for a foul on Bowey and Queen of the South scored the first goal of the game shortly after in the 33rd minute but with controversy; John O'Neill rebounded the ball into the goal after Bowey's initial shot was saved by the goalkeeper but Brechin defender Greg McCulloch claimed to have cleared the ball off the line, however, referee John Underhill awarded the goal. Weatherson almost scored again shortly before half time when he headed the ball into goalkeeper Hay's hands after a Robbie Neilson cross.

=== Second half ===
From the beginning of the second half the match was dominated by Queen of the South and they extended their lead after only two minutes. Defender Andy Aitken made a long pass to Joe McAlpine who crossed the ball from the left to the unmarked Derek Lyle near the six-yard box who headed the ball past the goalkeeper to score his third goal of the tournament. Brechin made the first substitution of the match three minutes after the second goal, replacing Graham Gibson with Chris Templeman. Brechin's best chance of the game came in the 58th minute when Charlie King's 20-yard shot forced goalkeeper Goram to make his first proper save of the match. In the 62nd minute, Brechin made their last substitution with Marc Millar replacing Paul Riley in the midfield. With three minutes left to play, Queen of the South had an opportunity to extend their lead further when Sean O'Connor's attempted header was hit wide from a corner kick by McAlpine.

=== Details ===
20 October 2002
15:00 GMT^{[n1]}

Brechin City	0–2	Queen of the South
	Report	O'Neill 33'; Lyle 47'

Broadwood Stadium, Cumbernauld
Attendance: 6,428
Referee: John R. Underhill

Brechin City	Queen of the South

GK
DF
DF
DF
DF
MF
MF
MF
FW
MF
FW
Substitutes:
MF
FW
DF
MF
GK
Manager:
(Scotland) Dick Campbell

(Scotland) David Hay
(Scotland) Greg McCulloch
(Scotland) Roddy Black
(Scotland) Jamie Smith
(Scotland) Harry Cairney (c)
(Scotland) Kevin Fotheringham
(Scotland) Charlie King
(Scotland) Paul Riley	(substituted off) 62'
(Scotland) Roddy Grant	(yellow card) 37'
(Scotland) Chris Jackson	(yellow card) 28'
(Scotland) Graham Gibson	(substituted off) 50'
(Scotland) Marc Millar	(substituted on) 62'
(Scotland) Chris Templeman	(substituted on) 50'
(Scotland) Barry Donachie
(Scotland) Derek Clark
(Scotland) Mark Cairns

GK	(Scotland) Andy Goram
DF	(Scotland) Robbie Neilson
DF	(Scotland) Derek Anderson
MF	(Scotland) Brian McColligan
DF	(Scotland) Andy Aitken
DF	(Scotland) Jim Thomson (c)
MF	(Scotland) John O'Neill
MF	(England) Steve Bowey
FW	(England) Peter Weatherson	(substituted off) 75'
FW	(Scotland) Derek Lyle	(substituted off) 84'
MF	(Scotland) Joe McAlpine
Substitutes:
GK	(Scotland) Colin Scott
FW	(England) Sean O'Connor	(substituted on) 75'
MF	(Scotland) Brian McLaughlin	(substituted on) 84'
DF	(England) Paddy Atkinson
DF	(Scotland) Eric Paton
Manager:
(Scotland) John Connolly

Match rules

- 90 minutes
- 30 minutes of extra time if necessary
- Penalty shoot-out if scores still level
- Maximum of 3 substitutions

== Post-match ==
Queen of the South goalkeeper Colin Scott, who had played in all rounds before the final, was ruled out of playing because of injury. However, manager John Connolly stated that he would not have played Scott even if he had been fully fit and opted with Andy Goram instead, saying: "I was not convinced of Colin's fitness", and "I told Colin there was never a chance of him playing in the Cup final". As a result of Goram's inclusion in the squad, he became the first player to win every domestic trophy in Scotland.

The match remains Brechin City's only appearance in a major national cup final. However, Queen of the South have made two further appearances in the final of the tournament since the match; losing to Ross County in 2010 and beating Partick Thistle in 2013. Queen of the South also reached the final of Scotland's main cup competition, the Scottish Cup in 2008, losing to Rangers.

== Notes ==
- 1. The match was scheduled to kick off at 15:00 (GMT) but was delayed by ten minutes to allow time for spectators delayed by traffic congestion to enter the stadium and take their seats.
