= Derek Lyle =

Scottish footballer (born 1981)

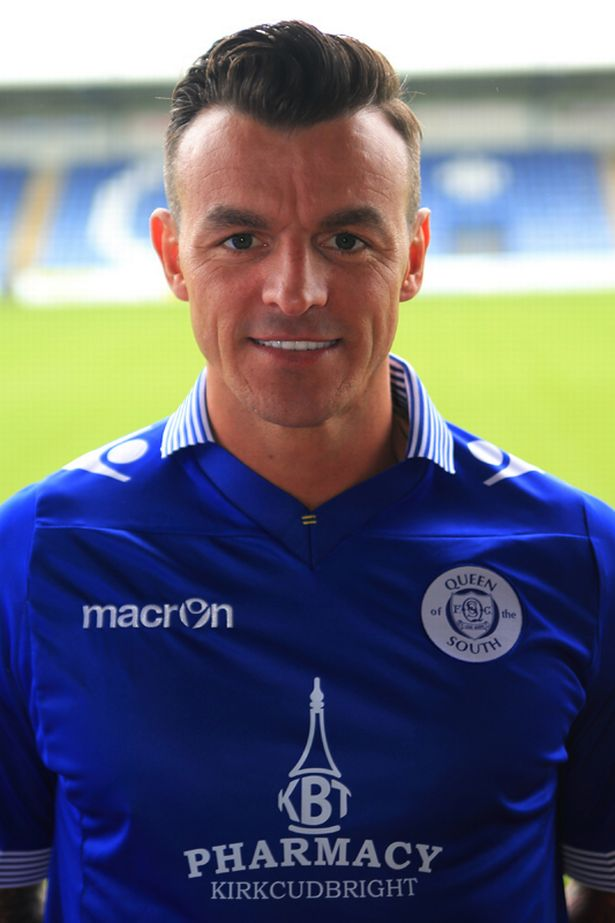
- Lyle at Palmerston during the 2016–17 season

Personal information
- Date of birth: 13 February 1981 (age 45)
- Place of birth: Glasgow, Scotland
- Position: Striker

Youth career
- 1997–1999: Partick Thistle Boys Club

Senior career*
Years	Team	Apps	(Gls)
1999–2002	Partick Thistle	37	(4)
2001–2002	→ East Stirlingshire (loan)	11	(7)
2001–2002	→ Queen of the South (loan)	13	(6)
2002–2006	Queen of the South	97	(16)
2003–2004	→ Stirling Albion (loan)	19	(10)
2004–2005	→ Dunfermline Athletic (loan)	0	(0)
2006–2008	Dundee	53	(18)
2008–2011	Hamilton Academical	31	(1)
2010–2011	Greenock Morton	20	(4)
2011–2012	Hamilton Academical	9	(1)
2011–2012	Cowdenbeath	18	(1)
2012–2018	Queen of the South	183	(63)
2018–2022	Peterhead	92	(17)
2022–2023	Broomhill	2	(1)
Total		585	(149)
- * Club domestic league appearances and goals

Derek Lyle (born 13 February 1981) is a Scottish former footballer who played as a striker. Lyle played for Partick Thistle, Queen of the South (two spells), Dundee, Hamilton Academical (two spells), Greenock Morton, Cowdenbeath, Peterhead and Broomhill. Lyle also had loan spells with East Stirlingshire, Stirling Albion, Dunfermline Athletic and the Doonhamers. Lyle's longest time in his career was spent with Queen of the South in Dumfries, where he scored 117 goals in 365 appearances over two spells with the club.

== Career ==
=== Partick Thistle and loan to East Stirlingshire ===
Lyle's career started at Partick Thistle at the start of the 1999–2000 season and remained at Firhill for three seasons, where he scored 4 goals in 37 league appearances. Lyle was loaned to East Stirlingshire scoring 8 goals in 12 league and cup appearances in the first part of the 2001–02 season.

=== Queen of the South (first spell) ===
Lyle then joined Queen of the South on loan for the latter part of the 2001–02. Whilst on loan at Palmerston the club lifted the Second Division title. Lyle scored 6 goals in 13 league appearances that led him to signing a contract with Queens straight after his loan spell ended.

Queens won the Scottish Challenge Cup the following season. Lyle and John O'Neill scored the goals in a 2–0 win at Broadwood over Brechin City. Lyle scored 16 goals in 97 league appearances during this first spell at Palmerston.

Lyle was loaned to Stirling Albion in the second half of the 2003–04 season. His 10 goals in 19 league appearances helped Stirling win promotion that season to the Scottish Second Division. After being told by Queens manager Ian McCall that he was not going to be the first-choice striker, Lyle left the club in 2006.

=== Dundee ===
Lyle joined Dundee from Queens in August 2006, scoring with a penalty on his debut in a 3–0 win over Clyde. He top scored for the Dens Park team in his first season there with 12 league and 3 cup goals. He featured less frequently though in the second half of his second season there after signing a pre-contract agreement with fellow promotion contenders, Hamilton Academical. Lyle scored 21 goals in 59 league appearances in two seasons at Dens Park.

=== Hamilton Academical (first spell) ===
Lyle joined Hamilton Academical in July 2008 after his new club secured promotion to the SPL, after finishing above Dundee, Lyle's previous club. Lyle suffered a career threatening knee ligament injury in the first minute of the club's 0–0 draw with Falkirk on 19 September 2009 when he was 27 years old. Lyle underwent a successful operation a week later but would not play again for the remainder of the 2009–10 season. Lyle signed a short-term contract extension in August 2010 and made his first-team return later that month. Lyle scored one goal in 31 league appearances during his first spell at New Douglas Park.

=== Greenock Morton, Hamilton Academical (second spell) and Cowdenbeath ===
In January 2011 Lyle signed a half-season contract with Greenock Morton which saw him through to the end of the 2010–11 season, where he scored 4 goals in 20 league appearances. On 5 March 2011, Lyle scored his fifth goal for the Cappielow club in a 3–1 win at East End Park over Dunfermline Athletic. Lyle was released when his contract expired at the end of that season.

Lyle then returned to New Douglas Park in July 2011 on a half-season contract and departed the club when his contract expired in January 2012, having scored one goal in 9 league appearances.

Lyle then signed for the remainder of that season for Cowdenbeath and scored one goal in 18 league appearances. Lyle and his teammates ended the season as Scottish Division 2 champions.

=== Queen of the South (second spell) ===
Lyle signed on at Queens for a second spell on 3 August 2012, alongside Derek Young. Lyle was part of the Division Two and Challenge Cup double-winning team and is the only player in the club's history to obtain four senior winners' medals. Lyle has won two Second Division titles and has also won two Challenge Cups.

On 27 August 2016, Lyle scored his 100th goal for Queens in a 1–0 win at East End Park over Dunfermline Athletic.

Lyle equalled Andy Thomson's total of 114 goals on 9 September 2017, scoring in a 2–2 draw away to Livingston and edged ahead of Thomson, scoring in a 2–1 defeat at home to Greenock Morton on 16 September 2017. Lyle scored his 116th goal for the Doonhamers on 28 October 2017 at home to Falkirk in a 4–2 home victory.

Lyle finished his Queens career three goals short of Bobby Black's total of 120 goals and is currently the fourth highest all-time goalscorer for the Doonhamers with 117 goals. Lyle's final goal for Queens was the Dumfries club's winning goal in the 2–1 home win over Montrose in the Scottish Cup third round replay on 21 November 2017.

On 25 June 2017, Queens Select won 5–3 versus Rangers Legends in Lyle's testimonial match. Lyle also had a Texas scramble testimonial golf day at the Dumfries and Galloway Golf Club on 17 September 2017, as part of his testimonial year. Lyle had two testimonial dinners, one at the Cairndale Hotel, Dumfries on 3 March 2018 and the other at Ibrox Stadium, Glasgow on 14 April 2018.

Lyle's final match for the Doonhamers was in the 3–0 win versus Dundee United in the penultimate game of the 2017–18 season. Lyle departed scoring 117 goals from 365 competitive matches for Queens.

=== Peterhead ===
On 29 June 2018, Lyle signed a one-year contract with Scottish League Two club Peterhead. On 11 August 2018, Lyle scored his first goal for the Blue Toon versus Albion Rovers in a 4–0 victory at Coatbridge, scoring the club's second goal in the 60th minute. On 27 October 2018, Lyle scored the Blue Toon's decisive two goals at Broadwood versus Clyde in a 3–1 win.

On 4 May 2019, Lyle played the final eleven minutes as the Blue Toon secured the Scottish League Two title with a 2–0 win versus Queen's Park at Hampden. On 24 June 2019, Lyle signed an extension to his contract with the Blue Toon until May 2020. Lyle signed another one-year deal to remain with the Blue Toon for the 2020–21 season, to play past his 40th birthday in February 2021. On 9 May 2021, Lyle extended his stay with the Balmoor club until the end of the 2021–22 season, to play past his 41st birthday in February 2022.

On 30 April 2022, Lyle replaced Payne in the 73rd minute versus Airdrieonians at the Excelsior Stadium, in the Blue Toon's final league match of the 2021–22 season, to seemingly end his 23-year playing career.

=== Broomhill ===
After Simon Ferry was appointed manager of Broomhill during the 2022 close season, he persuaded his former Blue Toon team-mate, Lyle to be his assistant manager and also remain as a registered player and to postpone his retirement from the game.

On 6 August 2022, Lyle scored one goal in the club's 3–2 win versus Berwick Rangers in the Lowland League. He is the first player to have scored a goal in the top five tiers of Scottish Football.

== Career statistics ==
As of 19 August 2022

Club	Season	League		Scottish Cup		League Cup		Other		Total	
Club	Season	Apps	Goals	Apps	Goals	Apps	Goals	Apps	Goals	Apps	Goals
Partick Thistle	1999–00	22	4	3	0	0	0	0	0	25	4
Partick Thistle	2000–01	13	0	0	0	0	0	1	0	14	0
Partick Thistle	2001–02	2	0	0	0	0	0	0	0	2	0
Partick Thistle	Total	37	4	3	0	0	0	1	0	41	4
East Stirlingshire (loan)	2001–02	11	7	1	1	0	0	0	0	12	8
Queen of the South (loan)	2001–02	13	6	0	0	0	0	0	0	13	6
Stirling Albion (loan)	2003–04	19	10	0	0	0	0	0	0	19	10
Dunfermline Athletic (loan)	2004–05	0	0	0	0	0	0	0	0	0	0
Queen of the South	2002–03	33	6	1	0	2	0	5	3	41	9
Queen of the South	2003–04	13	1	0	0	1	0	1	1	15	2
Queen of the South	2004–05	23	7	2	1	0	0	0	0	25	8
Queen of the South	2005–06	28	2	2	1	1	0	1	1	32	4
Queen of the South	Total	97	16	5	2	4	0	7	5	113	23
Dundee	2006–07	28	12	2	3	0	0	0	0	30	15
Dundee	2007–08	25	6	1	0	2	0	1	0	29	6
Dundee	Total	53	18	3	3	2	0	1	0	59	21
Hamilton Academical	2008–09	22	1	3	0	2	0	0	0	27	1
Hamilton Academical	2009–10	5	0	0	0	0	0	0	0	5	0
Hamilton Academical	2010–11	4	0	0	0	1	0	0	0	5	0
Hamilton Academical	Total	31	1	3	0	3	0	0	0	37	1
Greenock Morton	2010–11	20	4	1	1	0	0	0	0	21	5
Hamilton Academical	2011–12	9	1	0	0	0	0	2	0	11	1
Cowdenbeath	2011–12	18	1	0	0	0	0	0	0	18	1
Queen of the South	2012–13	29	13	1	0	3	1	3	0	36	14
Queen of the South	2013–14	35	7	3	1	3	3	3	1	44	12
Queen of the South	2014–15	34	15	2	2	2	2	3	2	41	21
Queen of the South	2015–16	32	13	1	1	2	2	2	1	37	17
Queen of the South	2016–17	27	10	1	0	6	2	3	2	37	14
Queen of the South	2017–18	26	5	2	1	4	0	3	2	35	8
Queen of the South	Total	183	63	10	5	20	10	17	8	230	86
Peterhead	2018–19	28	9	2	1	2	0	1	0	33	10
Peterhead	2019–20	24	5	1	0	4	1	0	0	29	6
Peterhead	2020–21	16	2	0	0	3	0	0	0	19	2
Peterhead	2021–22	24	1	3	0	4	0	2	0	33	1
Peterhead	Total	92	17	6	1	13	1	3	0	114	19
Ooen Goal Broomhill	2022–23	2	1	0	0	0	0	0	0	2	1
Career total		585	149	32	13	42	11	31	13	690	186

== Honours ==
Partick Thistle

- Scottish Second Division Champions: 2000–01

Queen of the South

- Scottish Second Division Champions: 2001–02, 2012–13
- Scottish Challenge Cup Winners: 2002–03, 2012–13

Stirling Albion

- Scottish Third Division Promotion: 2003–04

Cowdenbeath

- Scottish Second Division Champions: 2011–12

Peterhead

- Scottish League Two Champions: 2018–19
