= Neil Bennett =

Neil Bennett (or similar) may refer to:

- Neil Bennett (footballer, born 1980), English footballer
- Neil Bennett (footballer, born 1971), Scottish footballer
- Neil Bennett (rugby union) (born 1951), rugby union player for England
- Neil Bennett (politician) (born 1958), Australian politician
- Neil Bennett, a character in the film You May Be Next
- Neal Bennett (White Collar), a character in the TV series White Collar

== See also ==
- Neil Bonnett (1946–1994), American NASCAR driver
- Bennett Neil, cast member on Australian TV series Bondi Ink Tattoo
