= Robbie Neilson =

Scottish football manager (born 1980)

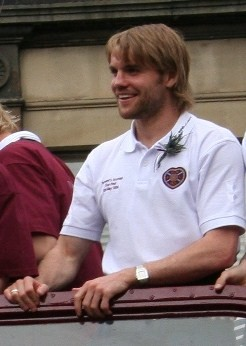
- Neilson with Hearts in 2006

Personal information
- Full name: Robbie Neilson
- Date of birth: 19 June 1980 (age 46)
- Place of birth: Paisley, Renfrewshire, Scotland
- Position: Right-back

Youth career
- 1994–1996: Rangers
- 1996–1999: Heart of Midlothian

Senior career*
Years	Team	Apps	(Gls)
1999–2009	Heart of Midlothian	200	(1)
1999–2000	→ Cowdenbeath (loan)	8	(0)
2002–2003	→ Queen of the South (loan)	13	(0)
2009–2011	Leicester City	26	(0)
2011	→ Brentford (loan)	15	(0)
2011–2012	Dundee United	21	(0)
2012	Falkirk	3	(0)
2013	East Fife	5	(0)
Total		291	(1)

International career
2000	Scotland U21	2	(0)
2005	Scotland B	1	(0)
2006	Scotland	1	(0)

Managerial career
- 2014–2016: Heart of Midlothian
- 2016–2018: Milton Keynes Dons
- 2018–2020: Dundee United
- 2020–2023: Heart of Midlothian
- 2023–2025: Tampa Bay Rowdies
- 2026–: Shenzhen Peng City
- * Club domestic league appearances and goals

Robbie Neilson (born 19 June 1980) is a Scottish professional football manager and former player who is currently head coach of Shenzhen Peng City in the Chinese Super League.

Neilson, who played as a right-back, started his senior career with Heart of Midlothian. After loans to Cowdenbeath and Queen of the South, Neilson became a key player in Hearts' squad; making 200 Scottish Premier League appearances and winning the Scottish Cup in 2006 with the club. After failing to agree a new contract with Hearts, Neilson signed for English Championship club Leicester City in 2009. He was later dropped from the Leicester first team and loaned to Brentford, and was then given a free transfer in the summer of 2011. Neilson played for Dundee United during the 2011–12 season, before finishing his career with Falkirk and East Fife. He won a single cap for Scotland in a Euro 2008 qualifier against Ukraine in October 2006.

Neilson returned to Hearts as head coach in 2014, winning the 2014–15 Scottish Championship title in his first season. After two successful seasons at Hearts, he was appointed head coach of Milton Keynes Dons during the 2016–17 season, before leaving by mutual consent in January 2018. He was appointed manager of Dundee United in October 2018 and guided them to promotion in the curtailed 2019–20 season; he then returned to Hearts, leading them to another promotion from the Scottish Championship in 2020-21.

== Club career ==
=== Heart of Midlothian ===
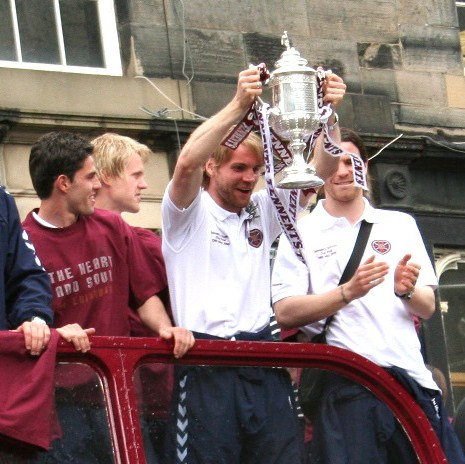
Neilson celebrating with Hearts after winning the Scottish Cup in 2006

Neilson was born in Paisley, Renfrewshire, on 19 June 1980. Neilson was originally attached to Rangers, through their Boys Club system. He joined Hearts' youth academy aged 16. Neilson won the Scottish Youth Cup in a Hearts side that included captain Scott Severin under manager Peter Houston in 1998.

He had time on loan at Cowdenbeath in 1999. In August 2002, Neilson joined Dumfries club Queen of the South on loan. He helped the club consolidate their Scottish First Division status and win the 2002 Scottish Challenge Cup Final after winning 2–0 over Brechin City. Neilson made 17 appearances for Queens including a man of the match performance at Clyde. He returned to Tynecastle Stadium in January 2003.

A high point in his career came in 2004 with his match-winning goal in Hearts' 2–1 away win over FC Basel in the UEFA Cup, his first in any competition for the club. He scored his first and only league goal for Hearts in a 3–1 win over Livingston later that season. He played all 120 minutes of the 2006 Scottish Cup Final, which Hearts won on penalties against Gretna.

Neilson was awarded a testimonial match by Hearts in 2008.

On 4 February 2009, he was given the role of Hearts' captain after the departure of Christophe Berra. Manager Csaba László did not start contract talks with Neilson until the season drew to a close. As a result of the new wage structure at Hearts, Neilson and the club could not reach an agreement for a new contract.

=== Leicester City ===
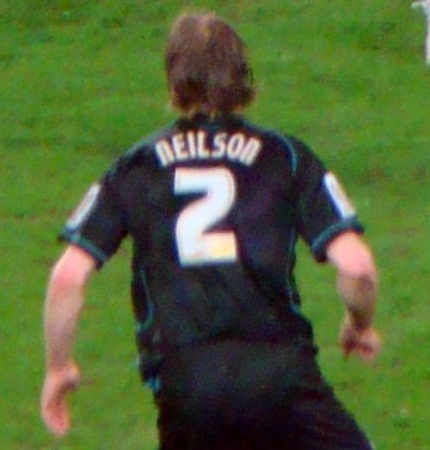
Neilson playing for Leicester City in 2010

In search of a new challenge, Neilson agreed terms with English Championship club Leicester City on 21 May 2009. The next day the club confirmed that he had signed a pre-contractual agreement and would join them in July. Signing a three-year contract, Neilson set his sights on helping the club win promotion to the Premier League. He made his debut in a 0–0 draw against Ipswich Town at Portman Road on 15 August, becoming the 1000th player to debut for the club in a competitive match. Neilson finished the season with 19 league games for Leicester. He scored his first goal for the club in a 4–3 League Cup win over Macclesfield Town on 10 August 2010.

==== Loan to Brentford ====
On 17 February 2011, Neilson joined Brentford on loan for a month, which was extended until the end of the season on 23 March 2011. On 3 April 2011, Neilson started in the Football League Trophy Final playing the full 90 minutes. Carlisle United won the match 1–0. On 27 May 2011, manager Sven-Göran Eriksson allowed Neilson along with Michael Lamey to speak to other clubs in search of more regular first team opportunities.

=== Dundee United ===
After training briefly with Falkirk and Burton Albion, Neilson agreed to sign a contract with Dundee United on 15 November 2011 until the end of the 2011–12 season. His debut for the Tannadice Park club was against his former club Hearts on 19 November 2011. Neilson soon became a regular in the first team and manager Peter Houston said he was keen to keep Neilson at the club. At the end of the season, Neilson was offered a new contract, but he turned the offer down and was released by the club.

=== Falkirk ===
After his release, Neilson was linked with Scottish First Division side Falkirk. On 6 October 2012, Neilson played as a trialist for Falkirk in a league match against Dunfermline Athletic. The game ended in a 2–2 draw and Neilson unfortunately suffered a cheekbone injury during the match. Upon recovering, he played in two further league matches against Raith Rovers and Livingston in November 2012.

=== East Fife ===
In September 2013, Neilson joined East Fife as player-coach. He made his debut playing as a trialist on 31 August 2013, against Rangers in a 5–0 defeat.

== International career ==
Neilson was capped 10 times by the Scotland national under-21 team. He won his first and only full Scotland cap in a 2–0 UEFA Euro 2008 qualifying defeat to Ukraine in Kyiv on 11 October 2006.

== Coaching career ==
=== Heart of Midlothian ===
On 31 August 2013, Neilson returned to Hearts as technical director of the Academy while also serving as their development team (under-20s) Head Coach. The side lost the Scottish Youth Cup final to Rangers on penalties in 2014.

New club owner Ann Budge promoted Neilson to the head coach position, working for director of football Craig Levein in May 2014. Neilson's first official match in charge was a 3–1 home defeat of Annan Athletic in the Scottish Challenge Cup on 26 July. Hearts began the 2014–15 Scottish Championship with five straight wins, including victories against Rangers and Hibernian. His team remained undefeated for their first 20 leagues matches until a 3–2 home defeat to Falkirk ended their run on 24 January 2015.

Neilson won the Championship manager of the month awards for August, October, November and March. Hearts clinched the league championship and promotion to the Scottish Premiership, at the first attempt, on 22 March. They finished the season 21 points ahead of nearest challengers, city rivals Hibernian, and 24 points ahead of third-placed Rangers. Neilson was shortlisted for PFA Scotland Manager of the Year, but lost out to John Hughes of Inverness Caledonian Thistle.

Hearts finished third in the 2015–16 Scottish Premiership, qualifying for the 2016–17 UEFA Europa League. In November 2016, it was reported that Neilson had agreed to move to Football League One club Milton Keynes Dons, subject to a compensation agreement between the clubs.

=== Milton Keynes Dons ===
On 2 December 2016, Milton Keynes Dons confirmed that Neilson had been appointed as manager, as well as his assistant manager at Hearts, Stevie Crawford. The club confirmed Neilson would take charge following the club's FA Cup game against Charlton Athletic. In his first league game in charge of Milton Keynes Dons, he recorded a 1–0 home win against AFC Wimbledon.

After a run of one win in 11 league games, Neilson left Milton Keynes Dons by mutual consent on 20 January 2018. The team had fallen into 21st place, inside the relegation zone.

=== Dundee United ===
Neilson was appointed head coach of Scottish Championship club Dundee United in October 2018 with a contract running until the end of the 2019–20 season. Neilson expressed confidence that he could repeat his achievement at Hearts and lead Dundee United to promotion to the Scottish Premiership. Dundee United's chairman Mike Martin stated that Neilson was the "outstanding candidate" to emerge from "a long list of impressive applications" for the post and expressed delight at his accepting the offer to take up the post. Neilson's first match in charge saw United defeat Partick Thistle 2–1 at Firhill. At the end of Neilson's first season, United missed out on promotion to the Premiership after losing to St Mirren in the play-off final. He led the side to the Scottish Championship title the following season, which was curtailed due to the COVID-19 pandemic.

=== Heart of Midlothian (second spell) ===
Neilson returned to Hearts, who had been relegated to the Scottish Championship after the curtailed 2019–20 season, in June 2020. He signed a three-year deal. On 31 October he led them to the 2019–20 Scottish Cup Final after 2–1 victory over rivals Hibernian, thus making them finalists for the second consecutive season; the final was lost on penalties to Celtic on 20 December after a 3–3 draw.

Neilson's team secured the Championship title with three games remaining on 10 April 2021 after contenders Raith Rovers and Dundee drew. He was the division's Manager of the Month in December and April.

Neilson led Hearts to an opening day victory over Celtic in the 2021-22 Scottish premiership. Hearts would follow this up with a 2–1 away win over St Mirren, their first win at St Mirren Stadium in the league for over a decade. Hearts early season league form would continue with a 2–0 victory over Dundee United at Tannadice on matchday 4 seeing Neilson named Scottish Premiership manager of the month for August. A last gasp equaliser at Ibrox against Rangers would see Hearts stretch their unbeaten run in top flight games to 9 games. Neilson's Hearts were eventually beaten 2–1 away from home by Aberdeen on Saturday 30 October having managed to go unbeaten for the full first round of fixtures for the first time since the 2005–06 season.

Neilson would once again lead Hearts to a Scottish Cup Semi-Final against rivals Hibernian for the 2nd time in 3 seasons following a 4–2 win over St Mirren at Tynecastle in the Quarter Finals. Hearts would defeat Hibernian 3–1 at Tynecastle in the final League game before the split, cementing 3rd place in the league. Just 7 days later, Hearts would once again defeat Hibernian 2–1 in the Scottish Cup Semi-Final at Hampden Park for the 2nd time in 18 months, setting up a second Scottish Cup final appearance since Neilson's return, this coupled with their league position guaranteeing a return to European group stage football for the first time since the 2004-05 season, a campaign in which Neilson played. Hearts lost the Scottish Cup final to Rangers 2–0 after extra time.

Neilson signed a new three-year contract with Hearts in July 2022. After losing a Europa League playoff to FC Zurich, Hearts entered the group stage of the Conference League. They finished in third place, winning six points from two wins against Latvian side FK Riga. Domestically, in January Hearts were well clear of their rivals for third place after a 3–0 win against Hibernian and a 5–0 win against Aberdeen. There was then an 11-point swing against Hearts, and the club sacked Neilson after a 2–0 home defeat by St Mirren meant that Aberdeen leapfrogged them into third place.

=== Tampa Bay Rowdies ===
The Tampa Bay Rowdies announced on 9 November 2023 that Neilson had signed a multi-year contract to become head coach of the USL Championship club. A strong start to the 2024 season saw Tampa Bay Rowdies defeat CF Montreal of the MLS 4-1 and go through the first 7 USL games undefeated. Memorable victories over Louisville and Charleston followed as the team showed their attacking profile, creating both the highest shot based xG and highest offensive touches in the opposition penalty area in the league throughout the season.

In September 2024, the devastation caused by Hurricanes Helene and Milton on the Tampa Bay Area forced the club to evacuate the area and play their remaining 10 games of the 2024 season away from home. The team secured a play-off place, progressing to the semi-final, where Charleston Battery defeated them 2-1. On 11 April 2025, only four games into the 2025 season and with the team remaining unable to play in the Tampa Bay Area, Neilson departed as Head Coach of Tampa Bay Rowdies.

=== Lommel SK ===
On August 15, 2025, Neilson became the Assistant Head Coach of Lommel SK, part of the City Football Group network, in the Belgian Challenger Pro League,

=== Shenzhen Peng City ===
On June 6, 2026, Neilson became the Head Coach of Shenzhen Peng City, again part of the City Football Group network, in the Chinese Super League.

== Managerial statistics ==
As of match played 19 November 2026

Managerial record by team and tenure
Team	From	To	Record					Ref
Team	From	To	P	W	D	L	Win %	Ref
Heart of Midlothian	12 May 2014	3 December 2016	106	62	22	22	58.49	
Milton Keynes Dons	3 December 2016	20 January 2018	66	26	16	24	39.39	
Dundee United	8 October 2018	21 June 2020	70	40	16	14	57.14	
Heart of Midlothian	21 June 2020	9 April 2023	126	64	22	40	50.79	
Tampa Bay Rowdies	9 November 2023	11 April 2025	42	16	9	17	38.10	
Shenzhen Peng City	6 June 2026		16	4	5	7	25.00	
Total			426	212	90	124	49.77	—

== Honours ==
=== Player ===
Queen of the South

- Scottish Challenge Cup: 2002–03

Heart of Midlothian

- Scottish Youth Cup: 1997–98
- Scottish Cup: 2005–06

Brentford

- Football League Trophy runner-up: 2010–11

=== Manager ===
Heart of Midlothian

- Scottish Championship: 2014–15; 2020–21

Dundee United

- Scottish Championship: 2019–20

Individual

- Scottish Premiership Manager of the Month: November 2016, August 2021, January 2023
- Scottish Championship Manager of the Month: August 2014, October 2014, November 2014, March 2015, August 2019, November 2019, December 2019, December 2020, April 2021
