= 2002–03 in Scottish football =

Football in Scotland
- Season: 2002–03

2002–03 in Scottish football

Premier League champions
- Rangers

First Division champions
- Falkirk

Second Division champions
- Raith Rovers

Third Division champions
- Greenock Morton

Scottish Cup winners
- Rangers

League Cup winners
- Rangers

Challenge Cup winners
- Queen of the South

Junior Cup winners
- Tayport

Teams in Europe
- Aberdeen, Celtic, Livingston, Rangers

Scotland national team
- UEFA Euro 2004 qualifying

The 2002–03 season was the 106th season of competitive football in Scotland.

== League competitions ==
=== Scottish Premier League ===
The 2002–03 Scottish Premier League was won on goal difference by Rangers by a single goal over Celtic. Both Rangers and Celtic qualified for the 2003–04 UEFA Champions League and Hearts got the UEFA Europa League place. Motherwell finished bottom, but there was no relegation from the SPL as Falkirk did not meet SPL stadium criteria. Celtic's trophyless season was in spite of being favourites to clinch the title and reaching the UEFA Cup final, losing in extra time to F.C. Porto.

| Pos | Team | Pld | W | D | L | GF | GA | GD | Pts | Qualification or relegation (Note: Teams played each other three times (33 matches), before the league split into two groups (the top six and the bottom six) for the last five matches.) |
|---|---|---|---|---|---|---|---|---|---|---|
| 1 | Rangers (C) | 38 | 31 | 4 | 3 | 101 | 28 | +73 | 97 | Qualification for the Champions League third qualifying round |
| 2 | Celtic | 38 | 31 | 4 | 3 | 98 | 26 | +72 | 97 | Qualification for the Champions League second qualifying round |
| 3 | Heart of Midlothian | 38 | 18 | 9 | 11 | 57 | 51 | +6 | 63 | Qualification for the UEFA Cup first round |
| 4 | Kilmarnock | 38 | 16 | 9 | 13 | 47 | 56 | −9 | 57 | |
| 5 | Dunfermline Athletic | 38 | 13 | 7 | 18 | 54 | 71 | −17 | 46 | |
| 6 | Dundee | 38 | 10 | 14 | 14 | 50 | 60 | −10 | 44 | Qualification for the UEFA Cup first round (Note: As Rangers, the 2002–03 Scottish Cup winners, qualified for the UEFA Champions League via their league position, the place in the UEFA Cup was passed onto Dundee, the cup runners-up) |
| 7 | Hibernian | 38 | 15 | 6 | 17 | 56 | 64 | −8 | 51 | |
| 8 | Aberdeen | 38 | 13 | 10 | 15 | 41 | 54 | −13 | 49 | |
| 9 | Livingston | 38 | 9 | 8 | 21 | 48 | 62 | −14 | 35 | |
| 10 | Partick Thistle | 38 | 8 | 11 | 19 | 37 | 58 | −21 | 35 | |
| 11 | Dundee United | 38 | 7 | 11 | 20 | 35 | 68 | −33 | 32 | |
| 12 | Motherwell | 38 | 7 | 7 | 24 | 45 | 71 | −26 | 28 | Spared from relegation (Note: As the First Division champions Falkirk did not have a suitable ground for the SPL, bottom club Motherwell were spared from relegation.) |

Source: Scottish Professional Football League
Rules for classification: 1) Points; 2) Goal difference; 3) Goals scored
(C) Champions
Notes:

Note: There was no relegation from the Scottish Premier League.

=== Scottish First Division ===
| Pos | Team | Pld | W | D | L | GF | GA | GD | Pts | Promotion or relegation |
|---|---|---|---|---|---|---|---|---|---|---|
| 1 | Falkirk (C) | 36 | 25 | 6 | 5 | 80 | 32 | +48 | 81 | |
| 2 | Clyde | 36 | 21 | 9 | 6 | 66 | 37 | +29 | 72 | |
| 3 | St Johnstone | 36 | 20 | 7 | 9 | 49 | 29 | +20 | 67 | |
| 4 | Inverness CT | 36 | 20 | 5 | 11 | 74 | 45 | +29 | 65 | |
| 5 | Queen of the South | 36 | 12 | 12 | 12 | 45 | 48 | −3 | 48 | |
| 6 | Ayr United | 36 | 12 | 9 | 15 | 34 | 44 | −10 | 45 | |
| 7 | St Mirren | 36 | 9 | 10 | 17 | 42 | 71 | −29 | 37 | |
| 8 | Ross County | 36 | 9 | 8 | 19 | 42 | 46 | −4 | 35 | |
| 9 | Alloa Athletic (R) | 36 | 9 | 8 | 19 | 39 | 72 | −33 | 35 | Relegation to the Second Division |
| 10 | Arbroath (R) | 36 | 3 | 6 | 27 | 30 | 77 | −47 | 15 | Relegation to the Second Division |

Source: "2002-2003 First Division - SPFL Archive". SPFL.
Rules for classification: 1) points; 2) goal difference; 3) number of goals scored.
(C) Champions; (R) Relegated

Note: There was no promotion from the Scottish First Division.

=== Scottish Second Division ===
| Pos | Team | Pld | W | D | L | GF | GA | GD | Pts | Promotion or relegation |
|---|---|---|---|---|---|---|---|---|---|---|
| 1 | Raith Rovers (C, P) | 36 | 16 | 11 | 9 | 53 | 36 | +17 | 59 | Promotion to the First Division |
| 2 | Brechin City (P) | 36 | 16 | 7 | 13 | 63 | 59 | +4 | 55 | Promotion to the First Division |
| 3 | Airdrie United | 36 | 14 | 12 | 10 | 51 | 44 | +7 | 54 | |
| 4 | Forfar Athletic | 36 | 14 | 9 | 13 | 55 | 53 | +2 | 51 | |
| 5 | Berwick Rangers | 36 | 13 | 10 | 13 | 43 | 48 | −5 | 49 | |
| 6 | Dumbarton | 36 | 13 | 9 | 14 | 48 | 47 | +1 | 48 | |
| 7 | Stenhousemuir | 36 | 12 | 11 | 13 | 49 | 51 | −2 | 47 | |
| 8 | Hamilton Academical | 36 | 12 | 11 | 13 | 43 | 48 | −5 | 47 | |
| 9 | Stranraer (R) | 36 | 12 | 8 | 16 | 49 | 57 | −8 | 44 | Relegation to the Third Division |
| 10 | Cowdenbeath (R) | 36 | 8 | 12 | 16 | 46 | 57 | −11 | 36 | Relegation to the Third Division |

Rules for classification: 1) points; 2) goal difference; 3) number of goals scored.
(C) Champions; (P) Promoted; (R) Relegated

=== Scottish Third Division ===
| Pos | Team | Pld | W | D | L | GF | GA | GD | Pts | Promotion |
|---|---|---|---|---|---|---|---|---|---|---|
| 1 | Greenock Morton (C, P) | 36 | 21 | 9 | 6 | 67 | 33 | +34 | 72 | Promotion to the Second Division |
| 2 | East Fife (P) | 36 | 20 | 11 | 5 | 73 | 37 | +36 | 71 | Promotion to the Second Division |
| 3 | Albion Rovers | 36 | 20 | 10 | 6 | 62 | 36 | +26 | 70 | |
| 4 | Peterhead | 36 | 20 | 8 | 8 | 76 | 37 | +39 | 68 | |
| 5 | Stirling Albion | 36 | 15 | 11 | 10 | 50 | 44 | +6 | 56 | |
| 6 | Gretna | 36 | 11 | 12 | 13 | 50 | 50 | 0 | 45 | |
| 7 | Montrose | 36 | 7 | 12 | 17 | 35 | 61 | −26 | 33 | |
| 8 | Queen's Park | 36 | 7 | 11 | 18 | 39 | 51 | −12 | 32 | |
| 9 | Elgin City | 36 | 5 | 13 | 18 | 33 | 63 | −30 | 28 | |
| 10 | East Stirlingshire | 36 | 2 | 7 | 27 | 32 | 105 | −73 | 13 | |

Source: "2002-2003 Third Division - SPFL Archive". SPFL (in Polish).
Rules for classification: 1) points; 2) goal difference; 3) number of goals scored.
(C) Champions; (P) Promoted

== Other honours ==
=== Cup honours ===
| Competition | Winner | Score | Runner-up | Report |
|---|---|---|---|---|
| Scottish Cup 2002–03 | Rangers | 1 – 0 | Dundee | Wikipedia article |
| League Cup 2002–03 | Rangers | 2 – 1 | Celtic | Wikipedia article |
| Challenge Cup 2002–03 | Queen of the South | 2 – 0 | Brechin City | Wikipedia article |
| Youth Cup | Celtic | 3 – 1 (a.e.t.) | Aberdeen | |
| Junior Cup | Tayport | 1 – 0 | Linlithgow Rose | |

=== Individual honours ===
==== SPFA awards ====
| Award | Player | Team |
|---|---|---|
| Players' Player of the Year | (Scotland) Barry Ferguson | Rangers |
| Young Player of the Year | (Scotland) James McFadden | Motherwell |

==== SFWA awards ====
| Award | Player | Team |
|---|---|---|
| Footballer of the Year | (Scotland) Barry Ferguson | Rangers |
| Young Player of the Year | (Georgia (country)) Zurab Khizanishvili | Dundee |
| Manager of the Year | (Scotland) Alex McLeish | Rangers |

== Scottish clubs in Europe ==
=== Summary ===
| Club | Competition(s) | Final round | Coef. |
|---|---|---|---|
| Celtic | UEFA Champions League; UEFA Europa League | Third qualifying round Runners-Up | 22.00 |
| Livingston | UEFA Europa League | First round | 3.00 |
| Aberdeen | UEFA Europa League | First round | 2.50 |
| Rangers | UEFA Europa League | First round | 2.00 |

Average coefficient – 7.375

=== Celtic ===
| Date | Venue | Opponents | Score | Celtic scorer(s) | Report |
Champions League Third qualifying round
| 14 August | Celtic Park, Glasgow (H) | (Switzerland) FC Basel | 3–1 | Henrik Larsson (pen.), Chris Sutton, Mohammed Sylla | BBC Sport |
| 28 August | St. Jakob-Park, Basel (A) | (Switzerland) FC Basel | 0–2 | | BBC Sport |
UEFA Cup First round
| 19 September | Celtic Park, Glasgow (H) | (Lithuania) FK Sūduva | 8–1 | Henrik Larsson (3), Stilian Petrov, Chris Sutton, Paul Lambert, John Hartson, Joos Valgaeren | BBC Sport |
| 3 October | Sūduva Stadium, Marijampolė (A) | (Lithuania) FK Sūduva | 2–0 | David Fernández, Alan Thompson | BBC Sport |
UEFA Cup Second round
| 31 October | Celtic Park, Glasgow (H) | (England) Blackburn Rovers | 1–0 | Henrik Larsson | BBC Sport |
| 14 November | Ewood Park, Blackburn (A) | (England) Blackburn Rovers | 2–0 | Henrik Larsson, Chris Sutton | BBC Sport |
UEFA Cup Third round
| 28 November | Celtic Park, Glasgow (H) | (Spain) Celta de Vigo | 1–0 | Henrik Larsson | BBC Sport |
| 13 February | Balaídos, Vigo (A) | (Spain) Celta de Vigo | 1–2 | John Hartson | BBC Sport |
UEFA Cup Fourth round
| 21 February | Celtic Park, Glasgow (H) | (Germany) VfB Stuttgart | 3–1 | Paul Lambert, Shaun Maloney, Stilian Petrov | BBC Sport |
| 27 February | Gottlieb-Daimler-Stadion, Stuttgart (A) | (Germany) VfB Stuttgart | 2–3 | Alan Thompson, Chris Sutton | BBC Sport |
UEFA Cup Quarter-final
| 13 March | Celtic Park, Glasgow (H) | (England) Liverpool | 1–1 | Henrik Larsson | BBC Sport |
| 20 March | Anfield, Liverpool (A) | (England) Liverpool | 2–0 | Alan Thompson, John Hartson | BBC Sport |
UEFA Cup Semi-final
| 10 April | Celtic Park, Glasgow (H) | (Portugal) Boavista | 1–1 | Henrik Larsson | BBC Sport |
| 24 April | Estádio do Bessa, Porto (A) | (Portugal) Boavista | 1–0 | Henrik Larsson | BBC Sport |
UEFA Cup Final
| 21 May | Estadio Olímpico de Sevilla, Seville (N) | (Portugal) F.C. Porto | 2–3 | Henrik Larsson (2) | BBC Sport |

=== Rangers ===
| Date | Venue | Opponents | Score | Rangers scorer(s) | Report |
UEFA Cup First round
| 17 September | FK Viktoria Stadion, Czech Republic (A) | (Czech Republic) Viktoria Zizkov | 0–2 | | BBC Sport |
| 3 October | Ibrox Stadium, Glasgow (H) | (Czech Republic) Viktoria Zizkov | 3–1 (a.e.t.) | Ronald de Boer (2), Neil McCann | BBC Sport |

=== Livingston ===
| Date | Venue | Opponents | Score | Livingston scorer(s) | Report |
UEFA Cup Qualifying round
| 13 August | Rheinpark Stadion, Vaduz (A) | (Liechtenstein) FC Vaduz | 1–1 | Óscar Rubio | BBC Sport |
| 29 August | Almondvale, Livingston (H) | (Liechtenstein) FC Vaduz | 0–0 | | BBC Sport |
UEFA Cup First round
| 19 September | Arnold Schwarzenegger Stadium, Graz (A) | (Austria) Sturm Graz | 2–5 | Rolando Zarate, Stuart Lovell | BBC Sport |
| 3 October | Almondvale, Livingston (H) | (Austria) Sturm Graz | 4–3 | Barry Wilson (2), Marvin Andrews, Davide Xausa | BBC Sport |

=== Aberdeen ===
| Date | Venue | Opponents | Score | Aberdeen Scorer(s) | Reports |
UEFA Cup Qualifying round
| 15 August | Pittodrie, Aberdeen (H) | (Moldova) Nistru Otaci | 1–0 | Darren Mackie | BBC Sport |
| 29 August | Stadionul Călărăşăuca, Otaci (A) | (Moldova) Nistru Otaci | 0–0 | | BBC Sport |
UEFA Cup First round
| 17 September | Pittodrie, Aberdeen (H) | (Germany) Hertha Berlin | 0–0 | | BBC Sport |
| 1 October | Olympic Stadium, Berlin | (Germany) Hertha Berlin | 0–1 | | BBC Sport |

== Scotland national team ==
| Date | Venue | Opponents | Score | Competition | Scotland scorer(s) | Report |
|---|---|---|---|---|---|---|
| 21 August | Hampden Park, Glasgow (H) | Denmark | 0–1 | Friendly | | BBC Sport |
| 7 September | Svangaskarð, Toftir (A) | Faroe Islands | 2–2 | ECQG5 | Paul Lambert, Barry Ferguson | BBC Sport |
| 12 October | Laugardalsvollur, Reykjavík (A) | Iceland | 2–0 | ECQG5 | Christian Dailly, Gary Naysmith | BBC Sport |
| 15 October | Easter Road, Edinburgh (H) | Canada | 3–1 | Friendly | Stevie Crawford (2), Steven Thompson | BBC Sport |
| 20 November | Estadio Primeiro de Maio, Braga (A) | Portugal | 0–2 | Friendly | | BBC Sport |
| 12 February | Hampden Park, Glasgow (H) | Republic of Ireland | 0–2 | Friendly | | BBC Sport |
| 29 March | Hampden Park, Glasgow (H) | Iceland | 2–1 | ECQG5 | Kenny Miller, Lee Wilkie | BBC Sport |
| 2 April | S Dariaus ir S.Gireno SC, Kaunas (A) | Lithuania | 0–1 | ECQG5 | | BBC Sport |
| 30 April | Hampden Park, Glasgow (H) | Austria | 0–2 | Friendly | | BBC Sport |
| 27 May | Tynecastle Stadium, Edinburgh (H) | New Zealand | 1–1 | Friendly | Stevie Crawford | BBC Sport |
| 7 June | Hampden Park, Glasgow (H) | Germany | 1–1 | ECQG5 | Kenny Miller | BBC Sport |

Key:

- (H) = Home match
- (A) = Away match
- ECQG5 = European Championship Qualifying – Group 5
