= Paul Shields (footballer) =

Scottish footballer (born 1981)

Personal information
- Full name: Paul Martin Shields
- Date of birth: 15 August 1981 (age 45)
- Place of birth: Dunfermline, Scotland
- Position: Striker

Youth career
- Milton Green

Senior career*
Years	Team	Apps	(Gls)
1998–2000	Raith Rovers	21	(1)
2000–2003	Celtic	1	(0)
2000	→ Albion Rovers (loan)	11	(5)
2002	→ Clydebank (loan)	16	(3)
2002–2003	→ Queen of the South (loan)	13	(1)
2003	Clyde	13	(1)
2003–2005	Forfar Athletic	67	(29)
2005–2006	Gillingham	17	(1)
2006–2007	Livingston	15	(2)
2007	→ Ayr United (loan)	5	(3)
2007–2008	Östersunds FK		
2009–2011	Bo'ness United		
2011	Broxburn Athletic		
2011–2013	Bonnyrigg Rose Athletic		
- * Club domestic league appearances and goals

Paul Martin Shields (born 15 August 1975) is a Scottish footballer who has played as a striker in the Scottish Premier Division for Celtic, as well as clubs in both the Scottish and English Football Leagues.

== Career ==
Shields began his professional career with Raith Rovers in 1998 and his early form earned him a spell training with Tottenham Hotspur the following year. He joined Celtic in March 2000 for a fee of £100,000, becoming then manager Kenny Dalglish's last signing for the club. Shields made one substitute appearance for the Parkhead side towards the end of the season, being loaned to Albion Rovers in the early stages of the 2000–01 season.

Following his return in December 2000, Shields failed to add to his solitary appearance for Celtic and was loaned out again in February 2002 to Clydebank. At the start of the following season, Shields undertook his third loan spell, this time with Queen of the South and when he returned to Celtic Park in January 2003, he was promptly released, joining Clyde on a short-term deal. With no permanent deal on offer, Shields joined Forfar Athletic on a one-year deal in July 2003, subsequently agreeing a new two-year deal at the end of the season. In the first half of 2005, Forfar rejected approaches from Stranraer and Grimsby Town, although Gillingham secured his signature in a £25,000 deal. Shields made just six league starts for The Gills before being released in May 2006, and he quickly joined Livingston.

In August 2007, Shields was released from Livi on his 26th birthday, allowing him to move with fellow player Daryl Smylie to Swedish side Östersunds FK.

Shields took a year out of the game after his spell in Sweden, before joining Junior side Bo'ness United in August 2009. During his spell at Bo'ness, he helped the club to the East Superleague title in 2009–10. In the following seasons Scottish Cup, Shields scored the winning goal in a second round tie against Scottish Football League side Queen's Park. He joined Broxburn Athletic in January 2011 before signing for Bonnyrigg Rose Athletic later that year.

Shields left Bonnyrigg in March 2013.

== Post-playing career ==
Since retiring from playing, he has worked in masseur roles for Hearts, Rangers and Scotland.

== Statistics ==
Correct after 11 September 2008

Club performance			League		Cup		League Cup		Total	
Season	Club	League	Apps	Goals	Apps	Goals	Apps	Goals	Apps	Goals
Scotland			League		Scottish Cup		League Cup		Total	
1998–99	Raith Rovers	Scottish First Division	14	0	-		1	0	15	1
1999–00	Raith Rovers	Scottish First Division	7	1	-		1	0	8	1
1999–00	Celtic	Scottish Premier League	1	0	-		-		1	0
2000–01	Albion Rovers (loan)	Scottish Third Division	11	5	2	1	-		13	6
2001–02	Clydebank (loan)	Scottish Second Division	16	3	-		-		16	3
2002–03	Queen of the South (loan)	Scottish First Division	13	1	-		2	0	15	1
2002–03	Clyde	Scottish First Division	13	1	1	0	-		14	1
2003–04	Forfar Athletic	Scottish Second Division	31	9	2	0	3	0	36	9
2004–05	Forfar Athletic	Scottish Second Division	36	20	1	0	2	0	39	20
England			League		FA Cup		League Cup		Total	
2005–06	Gillingham	English Second Division	17	1	-		1	0	18	1
Scotland			League		Scottish Cup		League Cup		Total	
2006–07	Livingston	Scottish First Division	15	2	1	0	1	0	17	2
2006–07	Ayr United (loan)	Scottish Second Division	5	3	-		-		5	3
Sweden			League		Svenska Cupen		League Cup		Total	
2007–08	Östersunds FK	Division 1 Norra	N/A							
Career total			179	46	7	1	11	0	197	47
