= Aaron Black (Irish footballer) =

Northern Irish footballer (born 1983)

Personal information
- Date of birth: 19 December 1983 (age 42)
- Place of birth: Larne, Northern Ireland
- Height: 1.86 m (6 ft 1 in)
- Position: Midfielder

Youth career
- Larne

Senior career*
Years	Team	Apps	(Gls)
2000–2004	Ayr United	37	(1)
2004–2005	W Connection	?	(?)
2005–2006	Glenavon	35	(4)
2006–2008	Larne	35	(13)
2008–2010	Crusaders	56	(9)
2010–2011	Coleraine	19	(1)
2011	Ballymena United	1	(0)
- * Club domestic league appearances and goals as of 20:50, 20 August 2011

Aaron Black (born 19 December 1983) is a Northern Irish former professional footballer.

== Biography ==
Aaron started his career at Ayr United. After being released he was due to join Inverness Caledonian Thistle, until financial difficulties arose causing the deal to fall through. Aaron then turned his sights to foreign fields and with the help of ex-Rangers player and Trinidadian international Russell Latapy a deal was sealed with the island's top team, W Connection.

In 2005, he returned to Northern Ireland to play for Glenavon and Larne, before moving to Crusaders where he was a member of the Irish Cup winning team of 2009, scoring one of the goals in the semi-final against Institute. On 5 May 2010, Aaron signed a two-year deal with Coleraine.

After an injury ravaged year, he signed for local rivals Ballymena United. He played one game for the Braidmen, in which he was sent off in the 49th minute against old club Glenavon. He never played for the club again and was released shortly after.

== Honours ==
Crusaders

- Irish Cup (1): 2008–09
- County Antrim Shield (1): 2009–10
