= Graham Guy =

Scottish footballer

Personal information
- Date of birth: 15 August 1983 (age 43)
- Place of birth: Bellshill, Scotland
- Position: Defender

Youth career
- Celtic B.C.

Senior career*
Years	Team	Apps	(Gls)
2001–2003	St Mirren	22	(0)
2003–2005	Stranraer	20	(2)
2005–2007	Cowdenbeath	41	(3)
2007–2008	East Fife	11	(0)
2008–2010	Berwick Rangers	39	(2)
- * Club domestic league appearances and goals

Graham Guy (born 15 August 1983) is a Scottish former professional footballer who played as a defender. He made 133 appearances in the Scottish League, including appearing in the First Division for St Mirren.
