= Cairndale Hotel and Spa =

Scottish spa and hotel

Coordinates: 55.0695°N 3.6056°W

The Cairndale Hotel and Spa is a hotel and spa in Dumfries, Scotland. The hotel occupies a Victorian sandstone building and has been operated by the Wallace family since 1983. In 2024, the hotel opened a refurbished adults-only spa following a £2 million redevelopment.

== Location and surrounding area ==
The Cairndale is located in Dumfries, the largest town in Dumfries and Galloway, in southwest Scotland. The town is situated on the River Nith and is associated with the later life of the poet Robert Burns, who lived in Dumfries during the final years of his life.

Nearby cultural attractions include Robert Burns House, where Burns spent the final years of his life, and the Robert Burns Centre, housed in an eighteenth-century watermill on the west bank of the River Nith. Dumfries Museum and Camera Obscura is also located in the town and contains collections relating to the natural and human history of the region.

The wider area includes heritage and outdoor attractions such as Caerlaverock Castle, a medieval stronghold south of Dumfries known for its triangular plan, moat and twin-towered gatehouse. Dumfries and Galloway is also promoted as a destination for walking, cycling, heritage tourism and coastal landscapes.

== History ==
The Victorian sandstone building was acquired by the Wallace family in 1983 from the Girotti Family. The hotel has since been operated as a family business. Matthew Wallace Sr, the son of a local butcher, has served as director alongside his son, Matthew Wallace Jr, who previously worked at the Peninsula Hotel in New York.

After the family acquired the hotel, its 48 rooms were upgraded to include en-suite bathrooms. Burnock House, an adjacent property included in the original purchase, was later refurbished and connected to the hotel by a link bridge.

In 1990, the family invested £1 million in the property, supported by a £250,000 grant from the Scottish Tourist Board. The investment funded the opening of the Barracuda leisure club, a new café and 16 additional bedrooms, increasing the hotel’s room count to 76.

In July 2024, the Cairndale opened a refurbished adults-only spa. The development covered 1,300 square metres across two storeys and cost approximately £2 million. The project followed a £400,000 development funding award from South of Scotland Enterprise. It was reported that the spa was expected to generate more than £12 million in additional income over ten years and create 16 jobs in the local area.

The spa was designed by Claire Caddick of Sparticulate and Mark Green of Curveline Design. The wider redevelopment also included changes to the hotel’s food and beverage areas, including a restaurant designed by 3 Design.

In 2025, the Cairndale launched a casual dining concept called The Oak. The hotel has also hosted seasonal events, including Christmas parties, Hogmanay celebrations, tribute performances, dining events and community workshops.

== Facilities ==
The Cairndale Spa replaced the hotel’s previous leisure club. Facilities reported at the spa include a thermal pool with jets, water blades, airbeds, an aroma steam room, a herbal steam room, a Himalayan salt sauna, an infrared sauna, a juice bar, a hammam, an ice bath, six treatment rooms, a gym and relaxation rooms.

The hotel’s dining facilities include The Oak bar and restaurant, the spa café, the lounge and Reivers Restaurant. Reivers Restaurant is led by head chef Alan Halkett, who returned to the hotel in 2022.

== Recognition ==
In April 2026, the Cairndale Spa was named by the AA among the top hotel spas in the United Kingdom. The spa has also retained a Five Bubble Luxury rating from the Good Spa Guide.

In 2024, Matthew Wallace Jr was named in The Caterer's Acorn Awards, which recognise 30 hospitality professionals in the United Kingdom under the age of 30. The award cited his role in the repositioning and refurbishment of the Cairndale Hotel.

In 2024, Hassan Mohamed Mbirikany, junior assistant manager at the Cairndale, won Employee of the Year at the Scottish Excellence Awards.

== Ownership and management ==
Matthew Wallace Sr purchased the Cairndale building in 1983 alongside his father and three brothers. In March 2020, he became sole owner after buying out his brother. Around the same period, Matthew Wallace Jr returned from New York as the Covid-19 pandemic began to affect international travel and hospitality.

Matthew Wallace Sr studied maths and chemistry at the University of St Andrews before attending hotel school at Ross Hall. His early hospitality roles included placements at the Kenmore Hotel in Kenmore and Cally Palace in Gatehouse of Fleet. He later worked for Swallow Hotels at the Royal County Hotel in Durham and at Rookery Hall before returning to Dumfries.

Matthew Wallace Jr studied International Hospitality Management at Oxford Brookes University and later worked in guest relations at Belmond Le Manoir aux Quat'Saisons in Oxfordshire. Before returning to the Cairndale in 2020, he gained hospitality experience in the United Kingdom and New York.
