= John O'Neill (footballer, born 1974) =

Scottish footballer

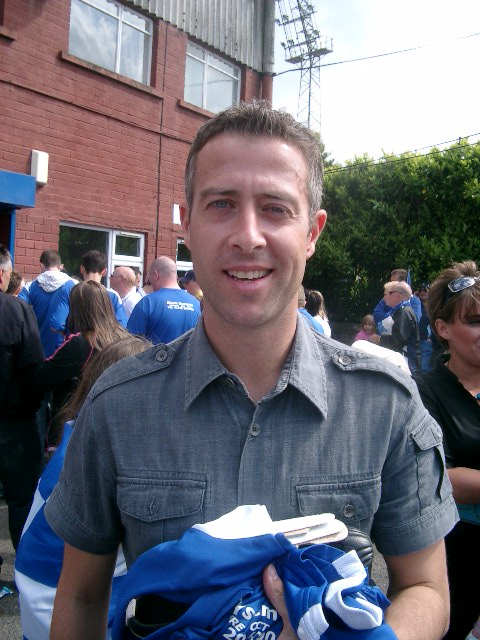
- O'Neill celebrating Queen of the South's run to the 2008 Scottish Cup Final.

Personal information
- Full name: John Joseph O'Neill
- Date of birth: 3 January 1974 (age 52)
- Place of birth: Glasgow, Scotland
- Position: Midfielder

Senior career*
Years	Team	Apps	(Gls)
1991–1994	Queen's Park	91	(30)
1994–1996	Celtic	2	(0)
1996–2000	AFC Bournemouth	125	(10)
2000–2001	Ross County	2	(0)
2001–2003	Queen of the South	80	(38)
2003–2005	St Mirren	58	(11)
2005–2008	Queen of the South	85	(20)
2008–2011	Stirling Albion	33	(7)
2011–	Auchinleck Talbot		

Managerial career
- 2010–2011: Stirling Albion
- * Club domestic league appearances and goals as of 09:00, 14 August 2010 (UTC)

John Joseph O'Neill (born 3 January 1974) is a Scottish footballer, who played as a midfielder.

O'Neill started his career with amateur club Queen's Park, before signing for Celtic in 1994. In his career, he had two spells of playing for Dumfries club Queen of the South. While he was with Queens, O'Neill won the 2001–02 Scottish Second Division and he was the club's top scorer and won the divisional player of the year title. O'Neill scored in the 2002 Scottish Challenge Cup Final victory against Brechin City. O'Neill also made a substitute appearance for Queens in the 2008 Scottish Cup Final against Rangers, which turned out to be his last appearance for the club. He was also a penalty kick specialist at Queens, scoring 27 goals from 29 attempts. In total he scored 70 goals for Queens in competitive first team fixtures.

In the summer of 2008 O'Neill signed for Stirling Albion as a player and was also appointed assistant manager. After manager Allan Moore left for Morton, O'Neill was appointed the new manager of Stirling Albion in May 2010. After winning only three league matches in the 2010–11 season, however, O'Neill was sacked in January 2011. After leaving the Binos, O'Neill played for Auchinleck Talbot.

== Honours ==
Bournemouth

- Football League Trophy runner-up: 1997–98
