= Kevin Fotheringham =

Scottish footballer

Personal information
- Full name: Kevin George Fotheringham
- Date of birth: 13 August 1975 (age 51)
- Place of birth: Dunfermline, Scotland
- Position: Defender

Youth career
- 1992–1996: Rangers

Senior career*
Years	Team	Apps	(Gls)
1996	Ross County	7	(0)
1996–1997	Hamilton Academical	14	(2)
1997–1999	Raith Rovers	58	(2)
1999–2000	Hill of Beath Hawthorn		
2000–2001	Arbroath	20	(4)
2001–2004	Brechin City	87	(20)
2004	Clyde	16	(2)
2004–2006	St Johnstone	13	(1)
2006	Víkingur Ó.	9	(2)
2006–2007	Raith Rovers	30	(6)
2007–2009	East Fife	58	(10)
2009–2011	Forfar Athletic	29	(3)
2011	St Andrews United		
2011-2012	Lochore Welfare		
Total		341	(52)

Managerial career
- 2017–2019: Hill of Beath Hawthorn
- 2019–2021: Dundonald Bluebell
- * Club domestic league appearances and goals

Kevin George Fotheringham (born 13 August 1975) is a Scottish former football coach and former player. He played as a defender for several Scottish clubs and Víkingur Ó. in Iceland. He has also coached East of Scotland sides Hill of Beath Hawthorn and Dundonald Bluebell in his time within the sport.
