= Colin Reilly =

Scottish footballer

Personal information
- Full name: Colin Reilly
- Date of birth: 4 September 1982 (age 44)
- Place of birth: Bellshill, Scotland
- Height: 5 ft 10 in (1.78 m)
- Position: Midfielder

Youth career
- Dundee United

Senior career*
Years	Team	Apps	(Gls)
1998–2002	Dundee United	0	(0)
2002	Greenock Morton	5	(0)
Total		5	(0)

Managerial career
- 2021–23: Vale of Clyde
- 2023–2025: Arthurlie
- * Club domestic league appearances and goals

Colin Reilly (born 4 September 1982) is a Scottish football manager and former professional footballer who played as a midfielder. He was most recently the manager of West of Scotland Football League club Arthurlie.

== Career ==
Reilly began his professional career with Dundee United but failed to make an appearance and was released in April 2002. Reilly went on trial with Morton in July 2002 and signed for them shortly afterwards. In Reilly's third match, he was involved in a "knee-high" tackle which saw him seriously injure former Dundee United teammate Sean O'Connor, earning a red card in the process. Reilly played just another four matches, with his final appearance coming in November 2002.

After leaving Morton, Reilly played professionally in South Africa, then became a manager in Dubai. Returning to Scotland, he was appointed manager of West of Scotland League club Vale of Clyde in August 2021. In March 2023, he moved to become manager of Arthurlie. He led Arthurlie to the final of the 2023–24 Scottish Junior Cup, their first appearance in the final of the competition since 1998. On March 17th of 2025, Reilly left his post as Arthurlie manager by mutual consent.
