= Neil Bennett (footballer, born 1971) =

Scottish footballer (born 1979)

Personal information
- Full name: John Bennett
- Date of birth: 22 August 1971 (age 55)
- Place of birth: Falkirk, Scotland
- Position: Defender

Senior career*
Years	Team	Apps	(Gls)
1990-1991	St Johnstone	0	(0)
1991-1996	Alloa	115	(3)
1995-1998	Stirling Albion	71	(7)
1998-2000	Livingston	21	(0)
2000	Montrose	16	(1)
2000-2001	Stirling Albion	21	(1)
2001-2004	Berwick Rangers	76	(7)
- Linlithgow Rose
- * Club domestic league appearances and goals

Neil Bennett (born 22 August 1971) is a Scottish former footballer who played as a defender for Berwick Rangers and Livingston.

== Career ==
=== Playing career ===
Bennett was an apprentice joiner when he was signed by St Johnstone in 1990. He left the club in 1991 without having made a first team appearance at McDiarmid Park. Bennett trained with East Fife in 1991, but was not offered a permanent deal.

He signed for Alloa in 1991 and made 115 appearances over a 5 year spell at the club.

The defender then signed for Stirling Albion in 1995 and scored 7 goals in 71 appearances at Forthbank Stadium.

Bennett signed for Livingston in 1998 and was part of the squad that won the 1998–99 Scottish Second Division. He found regular game time hard to come by at Livi due to big investment in the playing staff and incoming seasoned pro's being signed and keeping him out of the team.

After departing from the Almondvale Stadium, Bennett signed for Montrose in 2000 and played 16 in a short spell at the club before re-signing for Stirling Albion later in that year. The defender appeared 21 times for the Binos during the remainder of the 2000-2001 season.

He was on the move again in 2001, this time signing for Berwick Rangers. He remained at Shielfield Park for 3 years, scoring 7 goals in 76 appearances for the Wee Gers.

Bennett had a spell at Linlithgow Rose before retiring from playing.

== Honours ==
Livingston

- Scottish Football League Second Division : 1998-99
